= Eggbergen =

Coordinates: 46.9024269°N 8.6236574°E

- Municipality
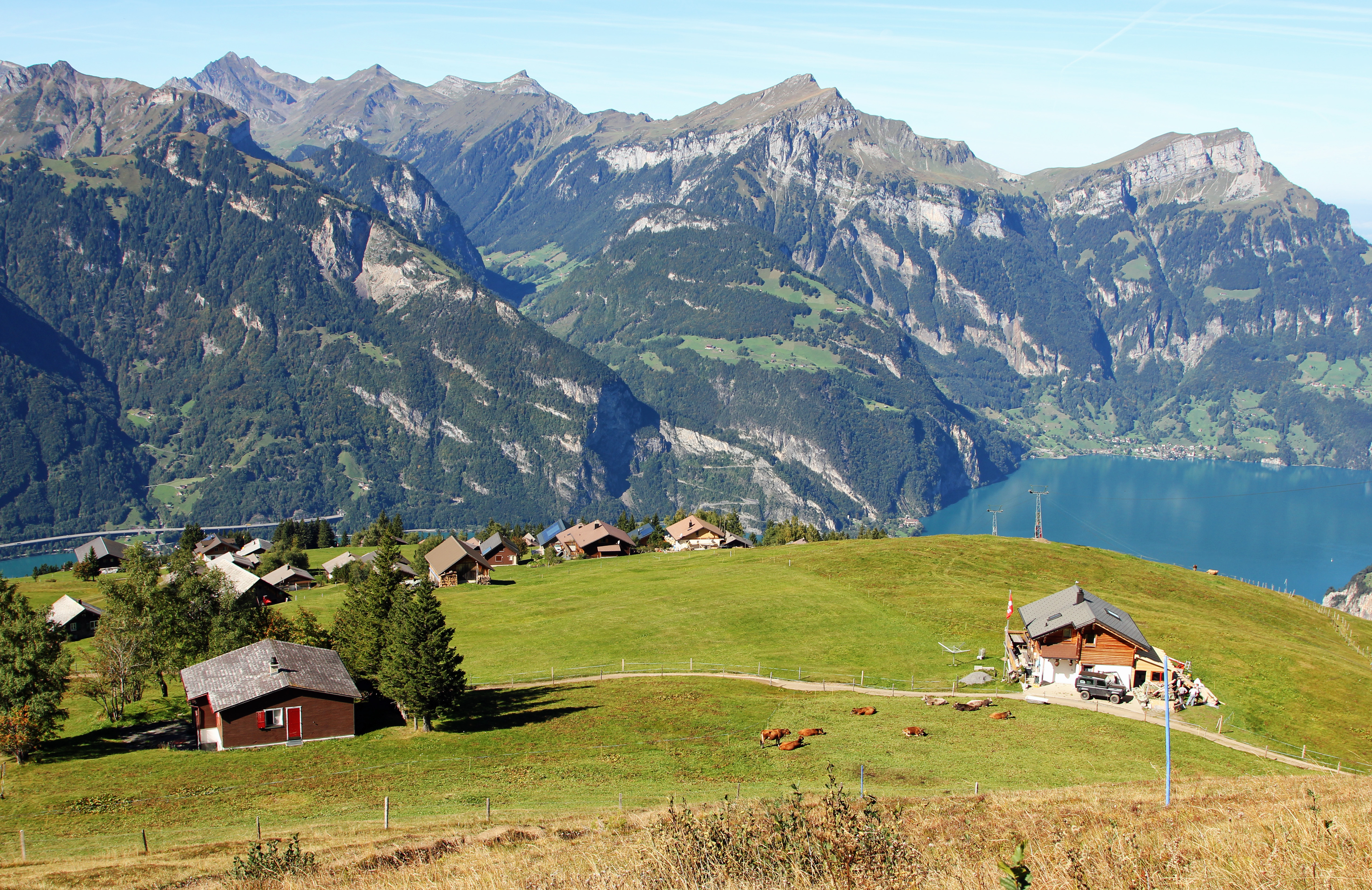
- Location of Eggbergen
- Location within Switzerland Location within Canton of Uri
- Country: Switzerland
- Canton: Uri
- District: n.a.
- Elevation: 1,509 m (4,951 ft)
- Time zone: UTC+01:00 (CET)
  - Summer (DST): UTC+02:00 (CEST)
- Postal code: 6460
- ISO 3166 code: CH-UR
- Surrounded by: Altdorf, Attinghausen, Flüelen, Muotathal (SZ), Riemenstalden (SZ), Schattdorf, Sisikon, Spiringen, Unterschächen
- Website: https://www.eggberge.ch/

Eggbergen is a hamlet in the canton of Uri in Switzerland.

== Tourism ==
Due to its location in the Swiss Alps, at height of 1000m, the area is a popular tourist destination. The area features numerous trails above Lake Lucerne and Altdorf.
