= Alplersee =

Lake in Uri, Central Switzerland, Switzerland

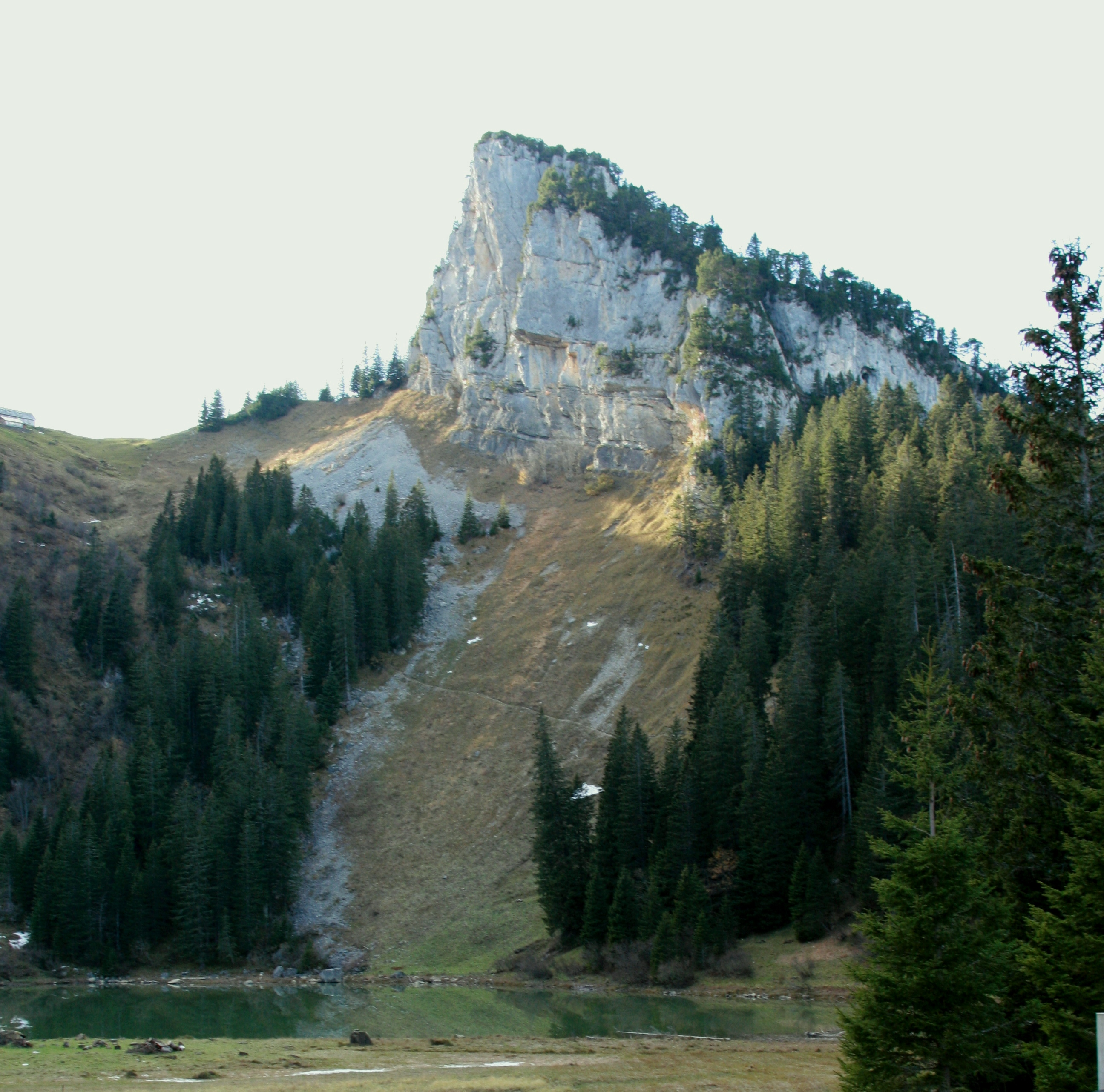
- Alplersee with the Holzerstock in background

- Location within Canton of Uri Location within Switzerland Location within Alps
- Interactive map of Alplersee
- Location: Sisikon, Canton of Uri
- Coordinates: 46°56′08″N 8°39′14″E
- Primary outflows: subterranean
- Basin countries: Switzerland
- Max. length: 225 m (738 ft)
- Max. width: 150 m (490 ft)
- Surface elevation: 1,506 m (4,941 ft)

Alplersee is a lake on the slopes of the Rophaien mountain near Riemenstalden and Sisikon in the Canton of Uri, Switzerland.

There is another lake in the canton of Uri with the same name near Unterschächen.
