= Axenstrasse =

Road in Switzerland

Coordinates: 46°57′14″N 8°37′14″E

A4
- Axenstrasse

Route information
- Part of E41
- Existed: 1865–present

Major junctions
- From: Brunnen
- To: Flüelen

Location
- Country: Switzerland

Highway system
- Transport in Switzerland; Motorways

The Axenstrasse is an 11.4-kilometre-long (7.1 mi) two-lane middle section with ongoing traffic between the A4 motorway and the A2 motorway, and part of European route E41 between the resort of Brunnen in the canton of Schwyz to the village of Flüelen in the canton of Uri in Central Switzerland. The road is built along steep cliffs on the east side of the Urnersee (first part of the Lake Lucerne) weaving through many rock fall galleries and tunnels along its route. Upon completion in 1865, the Axenstrasse was the first way to get to Uri that did not involve navigating Lake Lucerne.

== Name ==
The name of the Axenstrasse refers to the Axen, a particular part of the mountains, the Axenstrasse circumvents and traverses, the 600 m (2,000 ft) high, vertical rock between Flüelen and Sisikon, actually a farmed meadow terrace (Ober Axen and Unter Axen) right below the much higher Rophaien (2,078 m (6,818 ft)).

== Description ==
The Axenstrasse is a middle section between the A4 motorway and the A2 motorway, and a part of the European route E41 in a north-south direction, but still on a two-lane road with oncoming traffic. Between Brunnen and Flüelen, there are no major junctions, although about halfway through, just south of the border between the cantons of Uri and Schwyz, there is one small settlement, Sisikon. At the southern end of the route, there is a connection to the Klausen Pass road in Altdorf and a connection to the A2 motorway and European route E35 near the Seelisberg Tunnel on the other side of the Urnersee. The route, especially in the part south of Sisikon, involves many open passages with rock galleries and numerous openings in the west tunnel walls viewing Urnersee as a result of the tunnel blasting through the calcareous rock.

For all of its length, the Axenstrasse parallels the Gotthard railway, a part of the Swiss Federal Railways.

== History ==
The plan to build the Axenstrasse was developed since the inauguration of the road over the Gotthard pass as a continuation towards the Cantons Uri and Schwyz. But its development was stalled by the geological hindrances of the Axen rockface and the fact that Brunnen in Canton Schwyz and Flüelen in Canton Uri were connected by ship since 1837. But a better connection of the regions in Valais and Grisons towards central Switzerland, much more as during the 1850s other roads over the alps were developed. In 1860, the Military Department (tasked with the development of the roads over the Oberalp and Furka pass) inquired in the two cantons about a feasibility study about an Axenstrasse also from a strategic point of view.

In May 1861, the Landammann (cantonal council's president) of Uri Karl Emanuel Müller (1804–1869) presented plans for three different roads on different levels, which were all approved by the Parliament. (Note: Sources disagree: the HDS biography of Müller gives his terms as Landammann as 1856–1859 and 1864–1866.) After further discussions on the road to be built between the two cantons, the choice fell on the current one which was completed in 1865. The road costs were 842,000 francs, half of which was paid for by the federal government of Switzerland.

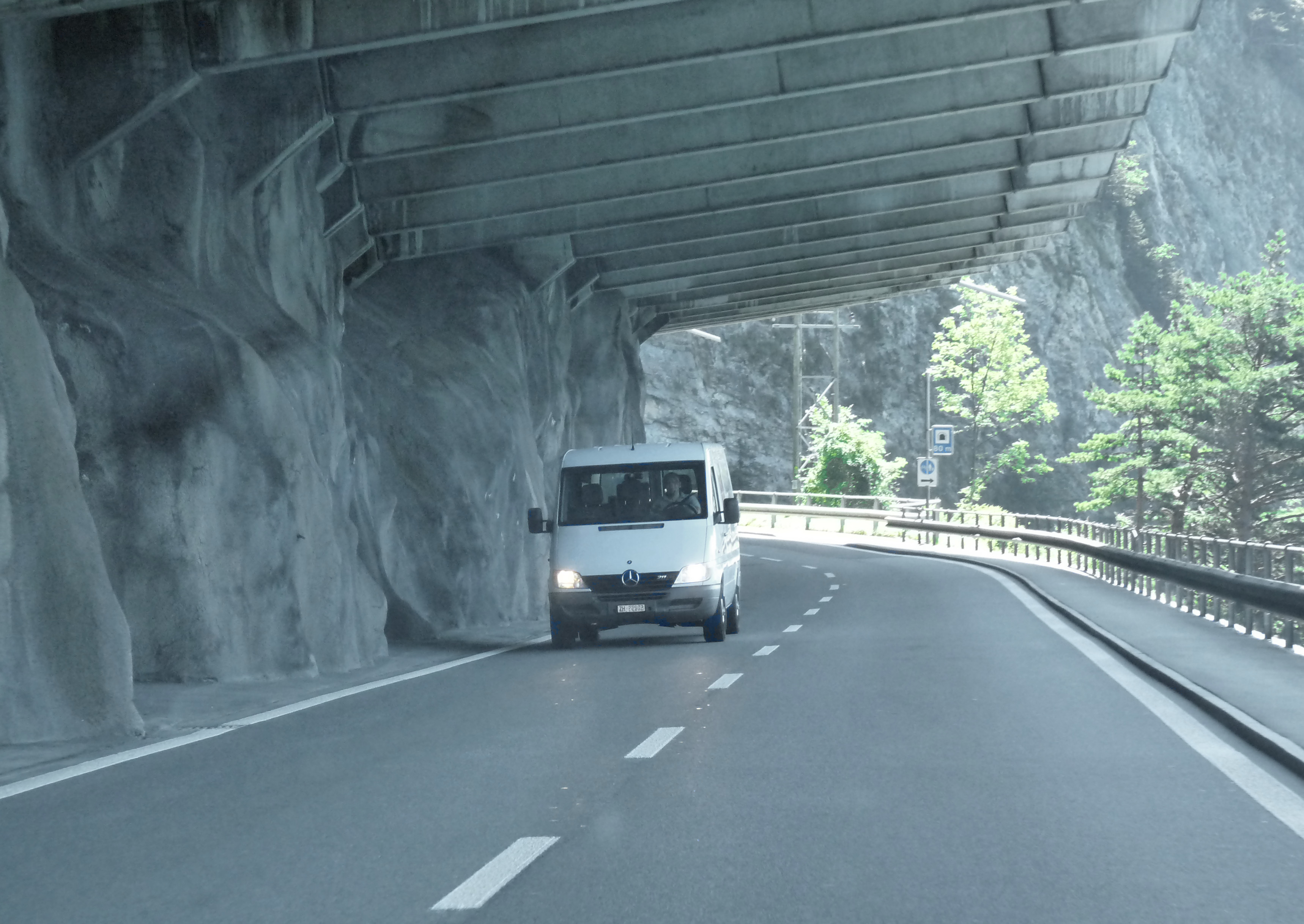
The Axenstrasse in 2009

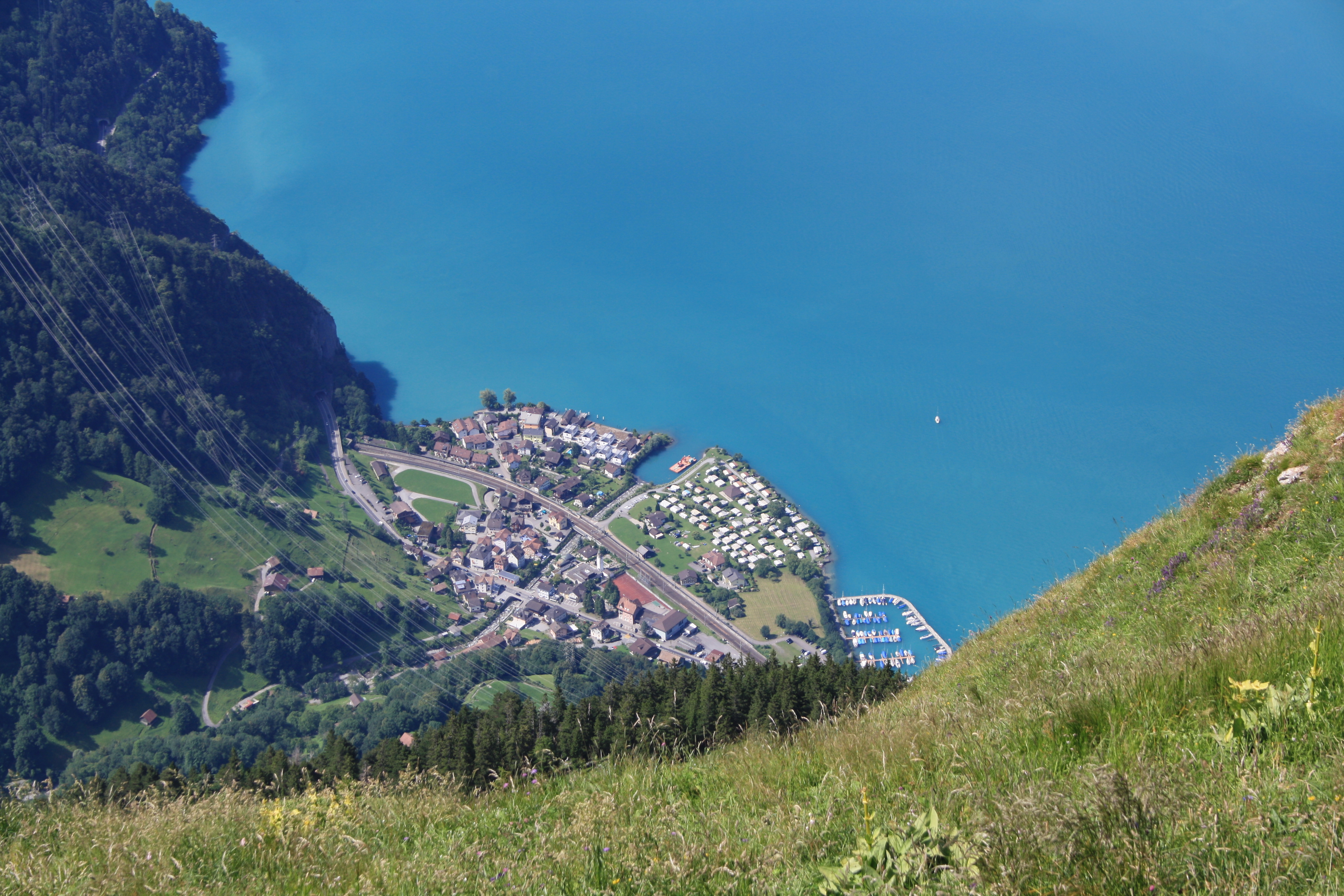
The Axenstrasse cuts through the village of Sisikon

Between 1937 and 1939, the Axenstrasse was altered to suit modern traffic in lieu of horse-drawn carriages, and a lane in each direction for road traffic was paved. Many sections of the old Axenstrasse were also closed to automotive traffic to serve as hiking trails. The Axenstrasse was again renovated between 1975 and 1990.
