= Treib–Seelisberg railway =

Funicular railway at Lake Lucerne in the canton of Uri, Switzerland

Coordinates: 46.981606°N 8.584104°E

Treib-Seelisberg-Bahn
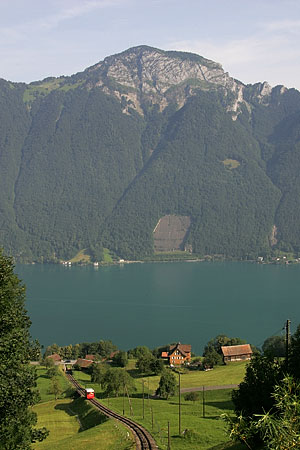

Overview
- Other name(s): Standseilbahn Treib–Seelisberg
- Status: in operation
- Owner: Treib-Seelisberg-Bahn AG
- Locale: Lake Lucerne, Switzerland
- Termini: "Treib (Talstation)"; "Seelisberg (Bergstation)"
- Stations: 2
- Website: seelisberg.com

Service
- Type: funicular
- Operator(s): Treib-Seelisberg-Bahn AG
- Rolling stock: 2

History
- Opened: 30 May 1916 (109 years ago)

Technical
- Track length: 1,149 metres (3,770 ft)
- Number of tracks: 1 with passing loop
- Track gauge: Metre (3 ft 3 3/8 in)
- Electrification: from opening
- Highest elevation: 770 m (2,530 ft)
- Maximum incline: 38%

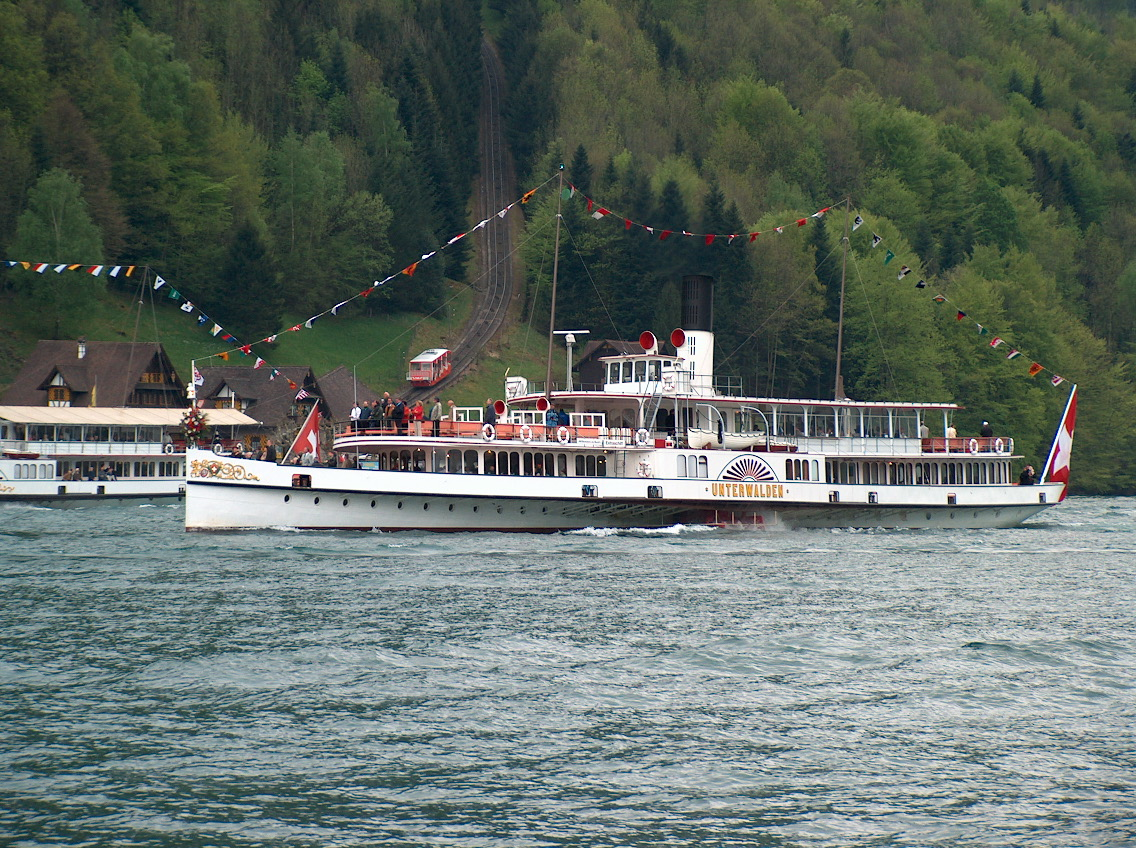
Interchange between paddle steamer and funicular at Treib.

The Treib–Seelisberg railway (German: Treib–Seelisberg-Bahn; TSB) is a funicular railway in the canton of Uri, Switzerland. The line links Treib, on Lake Lucerne, with Seelisberg on the mountain 330 m above. At Treib the funicular connects with regular passenger boats of the Schifffahrtsgesellschaft des Vierwaldstättersees, which connect it to Lucerne and other lakeside communities.

The line was granted its concession in 1910, with construction starting in 1914 and the line was opened in 1916. The current cars were supplied in 1965 and refurbished in 1992, whilst the control system was replaced in 1996.

== Operation ==
The line has the following specifications:

Feature	Value
Number of cars	2
Number of stops	2
Configuration	Single track with passing loop
Track length	1,149 metres (3,770 ft)
Rise	330 metres (1,083 ft)
Maximum gradient	38%
Track gauge	1,000 mm (3 ft 3 3/8 in) metre gauge
Speed	2.5 to 3.5 metres per second (8.2 to 11.5 ft/s)
Journey time	6 mins to 8 mins
Capacity	900 persons in each direction per hour

== See also ==
- List of funicular railways
- List of funiculars in Switzerland
