= Zwyssig =

Zwyssig is a Swiss surname. Notable people with the surname include:

- Alberich Zwyssig (1808–1854), Swiss Cistercian monk and composer
- Marco Zwyssig (born 1971), Swiss footballer
