= Quaianlage =

Quaianlage, Quai-Anlage, or Quai Anlage (plural: Quaianlagen) is a German term for a quay, or quayside. As a place name, it may refer to:

Germany:

- Quai Anlage Spree, in Berlin

Switzerland:

- Quaianlagen in Zurich
- Quai Anlage in Arbon (TG)
- Quaianlagen in Gersau (SZ)
- Quaianlagen in Lucerne
- Quaianlage (am See) in Sisikon (UR)
