= Oberbauenstock =

Mountain in Switzerland

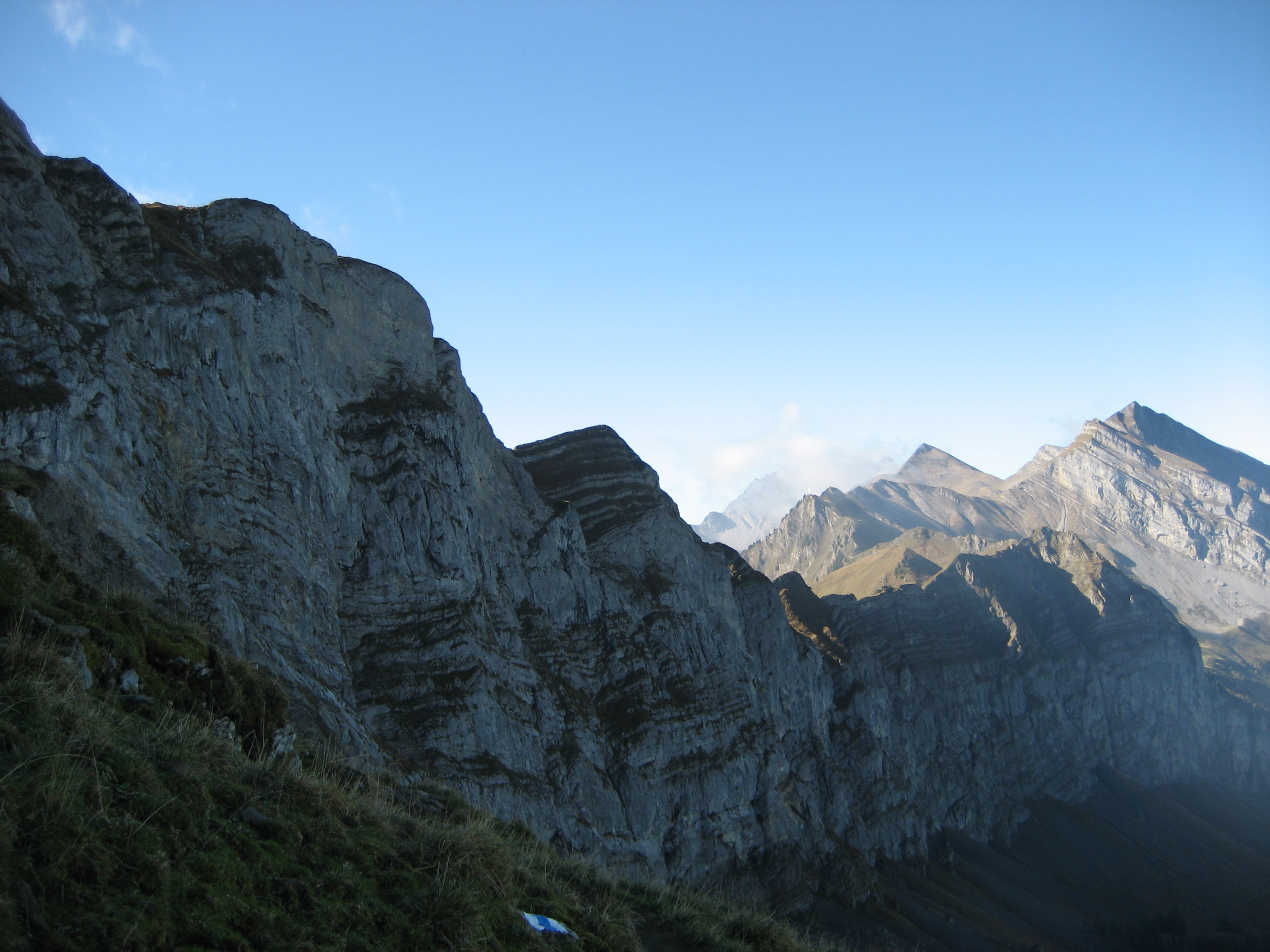
- The south side

Highest point
- Elevation: 2,117 m (6,946 ft)
- Prominence: 297 m (974 ft)
- Coordinates: 46°55′40″N 8°32′38.5″E

Geography
- Location within Switzerland
- Location: Nidwalden/Uri, Switzerland
- Parent range: Urner Alps

The Oberbauenstock is a mountain of the Urner Alps, overlooking Lake Lucerne in Central Switzerland. Its 2,117-metre-high (6,946 ft) summit is located on the border between the cantons of Nidwalden and Uri.
