= Bauen =

- Former municipality
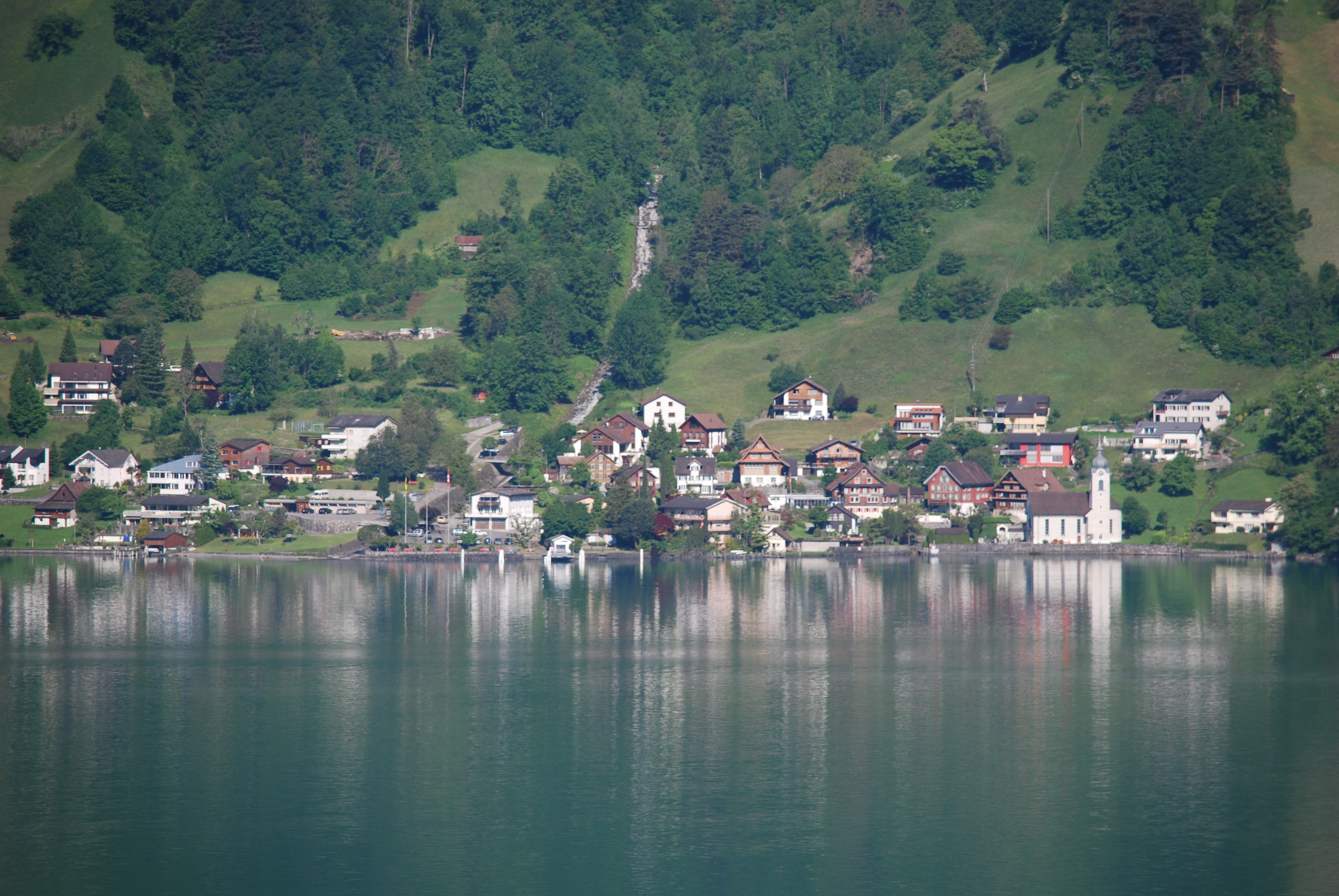

- Flag Coat of arms
- Location of Bauen
- Location within Switzerland Location within Canton of Uri
- Coordinates: 46°56′N 8°34′E
- Country: Switzerland
- Canton: Uri
- District: n.a.

Government
  - Mayor: Präsidentin Gemeinderat; Françoise Planzer (as of 2008)

Area
  - Total: 3.77 km^{2} (1.46 sq mi)
- Elevation: 436 m (1,430 ft)

Population (December 2019)
  - Total: 165
  - Density: 43.8/km^{2} (113/sq mi)
- Time zone: UTC+01:00 (CET)
  - Summer (DST): UTC+02:00 (CEST)
- Postal code: 6466
- SFOS number: 1204
- ISO 3166 code: CH-UR
- Surrounded by: Flüelen, Isenthal, Seelisberg, Sisikon
- Website: www.bauen-ur.ch

Bauen (German pronunciation: [ˈbaʊən]) is a former municipality on Lake Lucerne in the Swiss canton of Uri. On 1 January 2021 the former municipality of Bauen merged into the municipality of Seedorf.

== History ==
Bauen is first mentioned in 1150 as Bawen.

The municipalities of Seedorf and Bauen were the first in the canton that voluntarily decided to merge, after an amendment of the cantonal constitution allowed such mergers. The merger was planned to take place on 1 January 2021, provided it would be approved by the population of both municipalities in a referendum that was held in 2019. The referendum took place in October 2019; the population of both Seedorf and Bauen voted in favor of the merger with 80% and 69% respectively. The merger took place on 1 January 2021.

== Geography ==
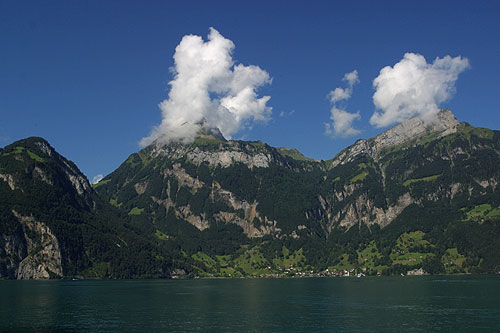
View of Bauen from across Lake Lucerne

Bauen had an area, as of 2006, of 3.8 km^{2} (1.5 sq mi). Of this area, 13.5% is used for agricultural purposes, while 74.9% is forested. Of the rest of the land, 2.9% is settled (buildings or roads) and the remainder (8.7%) is non-productive (rivers, glaciers or mountains). In the 1993 land survey, 68.3% of the total land area was heavily forested, while 0.8% is covered in small trees and shrubbery. Of the agricultural land, 1.8% is used for farming or pastures, while 10.3% is used for orchards or vine crops and 1.3% is used for alpine pastures. Of the settled areas, 2.1% is covered with buildings, 0.5% is industrial and 0.3% is transportation infrastructure. Of the unproductive areas, 0.3% is unproductive standing water (ponds or lakes), 1.6% is unproductive flowing water (rivers), 4.2% is too rocky for vegetation, and 2.6% is other unproductive land.

The village lies on the west side of the Urner lake, which is part of the bigger lake Vierwaldstättersee or the Lake of the Four Forest Cantons. Until 1956 the only way to reach the village was over steep footpaths from the neighboring communities.

Because of its position on the lake and the Föhn wind, Bauen has a very mild climate.

== Demographics ==
Bauen had a population (as of 2019) of 165. As of 2007, 8.7% of the population was made up of foreign nationals. Over the last 10 years the population has decreased at a rate of -14.1%. Most of the population (as of 2000) speaks German (99.1%), with Italian being second most common (0.4%) and Czech being third (0.4%). As of 2007 the gender distribution of the population was 48.7% male and 51.3% female.

In Bauen about 75.6% of the population (between age 25–64) have completed either non-mandatory upper secondary education or additional higher education (either university or a Fachhochschule).

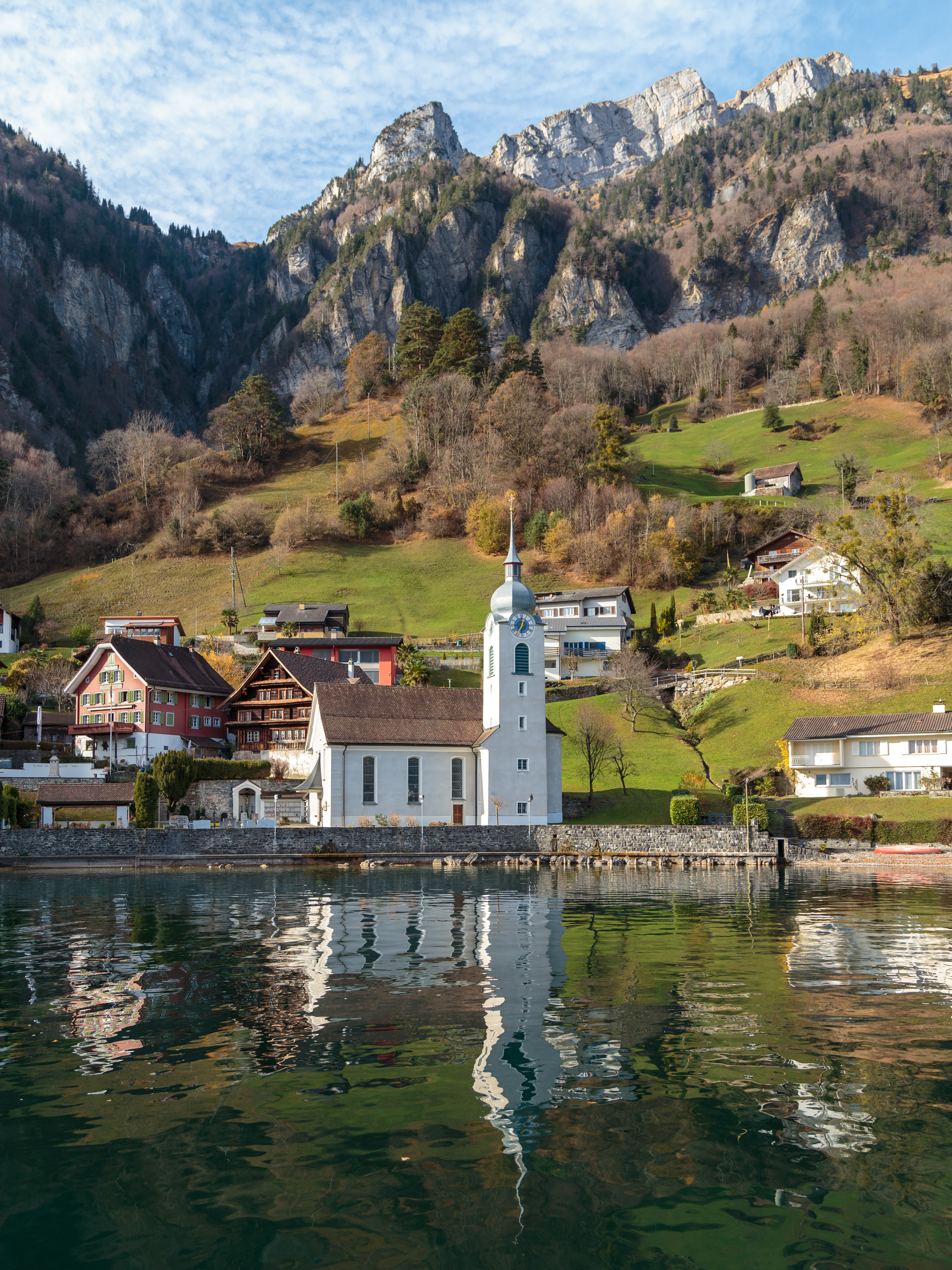
Bauen UR with St. Idda Church

Bauen has an unemployment rate of 0.76%. As of 2005, there were 16 people employed in the primary economic sector and about 8 businesses involved in this sector. 7 people are employed in the secondary sector and there are 3 businesses in this sector. 44 people are employed in the tertiary sector, with 7 businesses in this sector.

The historical population is given in the following table:

year	population
1799	115
1850	175
1900	167
1950	194
1970	157
2000	228
2005	192
2014	176

== Coat of arms ==
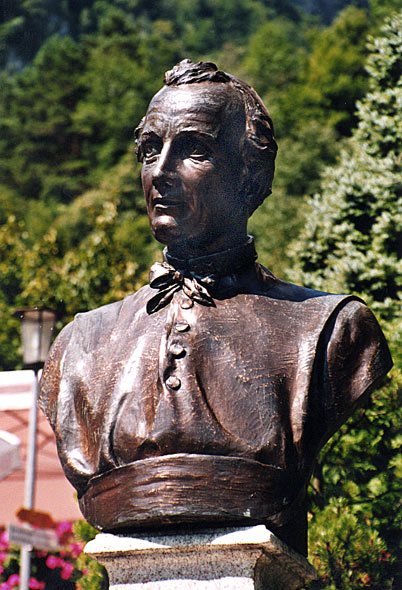
Alberich Zwyssig

First mentioned in 1849, the flag or coat of arms shows elk horns in gold with ten red flames along the horns tips with a bigger red flame over the head, on a black background. Originally made in 1843, the coat of arms comes from an idea of St. Idda von Fischingen, whose church choir had the symbol of an elk with flaming horns. This goes back to around 1812 when the church was inaugurated. The oldest coat of arms still intact hangs in the old guardhouse from Bauen to see.

== Notable residents ==
Alberich Zwyssig, the composer of the Swiss psalm "Trittst im Morgenrot daher", was born in Bauen. A bust of him is located in front of the village church.
