= Isenthal =

- Municipality
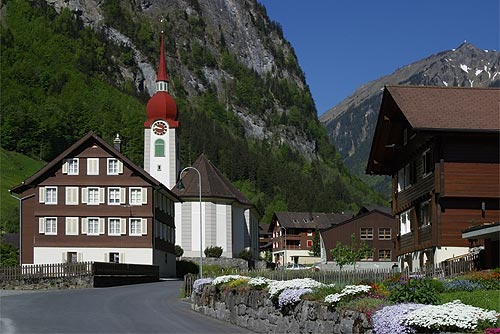

- Flag Coat of arms
- Location of Isenthal
- Location within Switzerland Location within Canton of Uri
- Coordinates: 46°54′N 8°33′E
- Country: Switzerland
- Canton: Uri
- District: n.a.

Area
  - Total: 60.79 km^{2} (23.47 sq mi)
- Elevation: 771 m (2,530 ft)

Population (December 2014)
  - Total: 514
  - Density: 8.46/km^{2} (21.9/sq mi)
- Time zone: UTC+01:00 (CET)
  - Summer (DST): UTC+02:00 (CEST)
- Postal code: 6461
- SFOS number: 1211
- ISO 3166 code: CH-UR
- Surrounded by: Attinghausen, Bauen, Beckenried (NW), Emmetten (NW), Engelberg (OW), Flüelen, Seedorf, Seelisberg, Wolfenschiessen (NW)
- Website: www.isenthal.ch

Isenthal is a municipality in the canton of Uri in Switzerland.

== History ==
Isenthal is first mentioned in 1280 as Yseltal.

== Geography ==
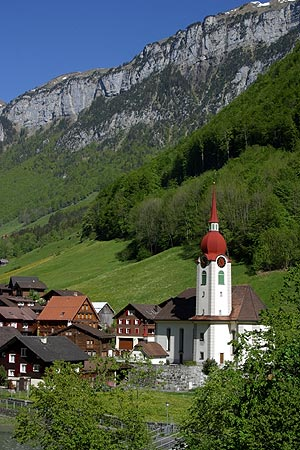
Isenthal Church and village

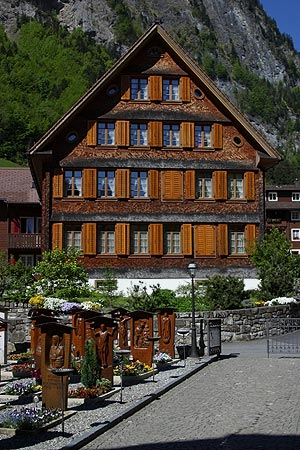
Cemetery and bank in Isenthal

Isenthal has an area, (as of the 2004/09 survey) of 60.97 km^{2} (23.54 sq mi). Of this area, about 28.0% is used for agricultural purposes, while 27.1% is forested. Of the rest of the land, 0.8% is settled (buildings or roads) and 44.0% is unproductive land. Over the past two decades (1979/85-2004/09) the amount of land that is settled has increased by 17 ha (42 acres) and the agricultural land has decreased by 32 ha (79 acres).

In the 1993 land survey, 21.4% of the total land area was heavily forested, while 1.4% is covered in small trees and shrubbery. Of the agricultural land, 5.7% is used for orchards or vine crops and 22.2% is used for alpine pastures. Of the settled areas, 0.3% is covered with buildings, and 0.2% is transportation infrastructure. Of the unproductive areas, 0.9% is unproductive flowing water (rivers), 35.6% is too rocky for vegetation, and 8.8% is other unproductive land.

The municipality is located at the intersection of the Chlital and the Grosstal. It consists of the village of Isenthal and widely scattered small settlements.

== Demographics ==
Isenthal has a population (as of December 2020) of 476. As of 2013, 1.0% of the population are resident foreign nationals. Over the last 3 years (2010-2013) the population has changed at a rate of -0.95%. The birth rate in the municipality, in 2013, was 3.8 while the death rate was 5.7 per thousand residents.

As of 2013, children and teenagers (0–19 years old) make up 25.6% of the population, while adults (20–64 years old) are 58.4% and seniors (over 64 years old) make up 16.0%.

In 2013 there were 168 private households in Isenthal. Of the 172 inhabited buildings in the municipality, in 2000, about 47.7% were single family homes and 16.9% were multiple family buildings. Additionally, about 44.8% of the buildings were built before 1919, while 14.0% were built between 1991 and 2000. In 2012 the rate of construction of new housing units per 1000 residents was 1.89. The vacancy rate for the municipality, in 2014, was 1.61%.

Most of the population (as of 2000) speaks German (99.3%), with Polish being second most common (0.4%) and French being third (0.2%). As of 2007 the gender distribution of the population was 52.4% male and 47.6% female.

The historical population is given in the following table:

Year	Population
1698	c. 150
1743	176
1799	360
1850	502
1900	595
1950	550
1970	570
1980	535
1990	505
2000	539
2005	538
2007	536

== Economy ==
As of 2012, there were a total of 215 people employed in the municipality. Of these, a total of 129 people worked in 47 businesses in the primary economic sector. The secondary sector employed 26 workers in 13 separate businesses. Finally, the tertiary sector provided 60 jobs in 18 businesses. In 2013 a total of 1.9% of the population received social assistance.

== Politics ==
In the 2015 federal election the most popular party was the CVP with 53.5% of the vote. The next three most popular parties were the SVP (28.0%), the GPS (17.0%) and other candidates received 1.5%. In the federal election, a total of 204 votes were cast, and the voter turnout was 51.5%. The 2015 election saw a large change in the voting when compared to 2011, due to only certain parties running candidates in each election. In 2011 only the SP and the FDP.The Liberals had candidates on the ballot, while in 2015 only the CVP, SVP and GPS ran.

In the 2007 federal election only the FDP appeared on the ballot and they received 92.3% of the vote.

== Education ==
In Isenthal about 60.5% of the population (between age 25–64) have completed either non-mandatory upper secondary education or additional higher education (either university or a Fachhochschule).

== Weather ==
Isenthal has an average of 150.2 days of rain per year and on average receives 1,562 mm (61.5 in) of precipitation. The wettest month is July during which time Isenthal receives an average of 193 mm (7.6 in) of precipitation. During this month there is precipitation for an average of 14.4 days. The month with the most days of precipitation is June, with an average of 15.5, but with only 182 mm (7.2 in) of precipitation. The driest month of the year is February with an average of 95 mm (3.7 in) of precipitation over 14.4 days.
