= Treib =

Community on Lake Lucerne, Uri, Switzerland

Coordinates: 46.987015°N 8.585343°E

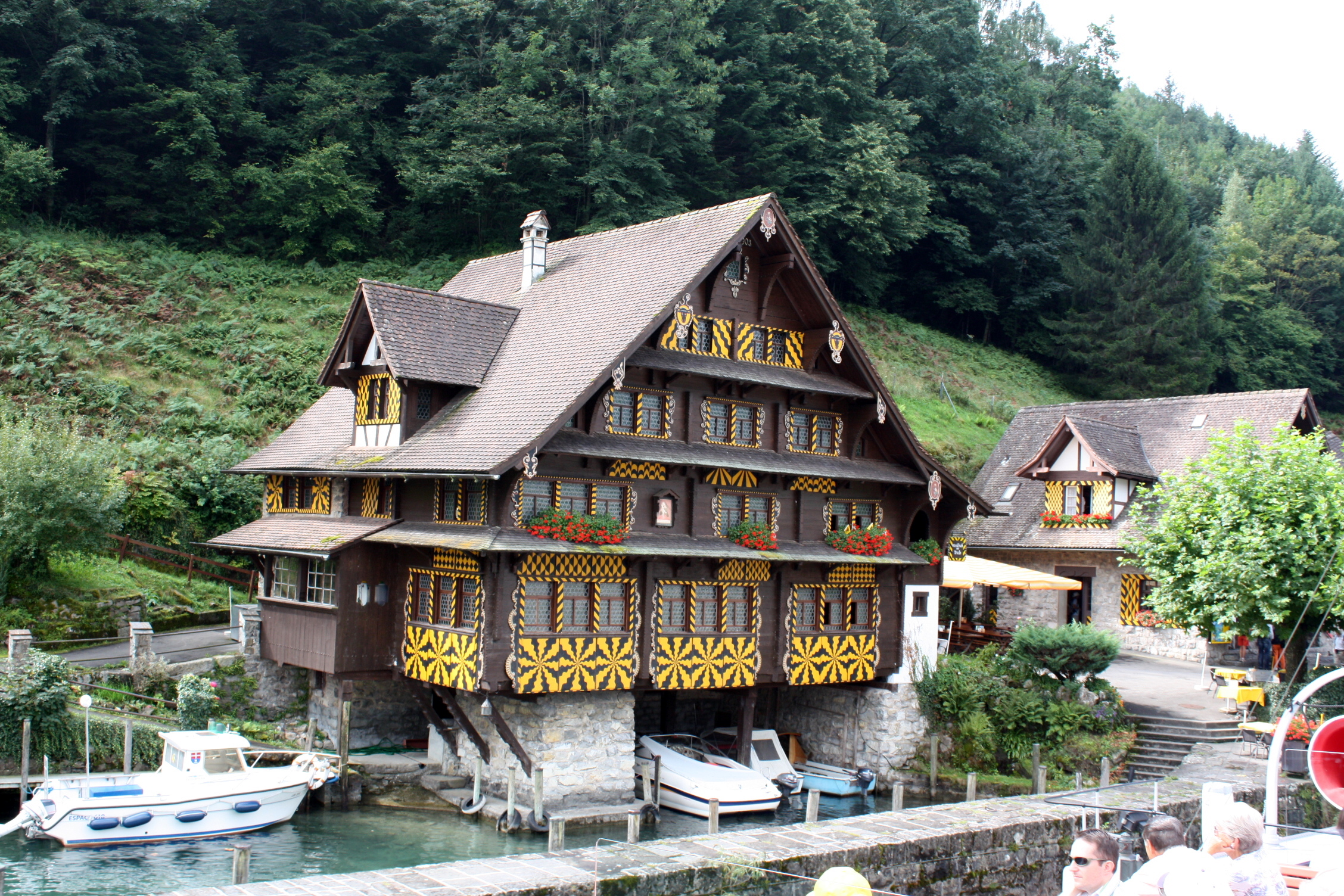
The tavern in Treib

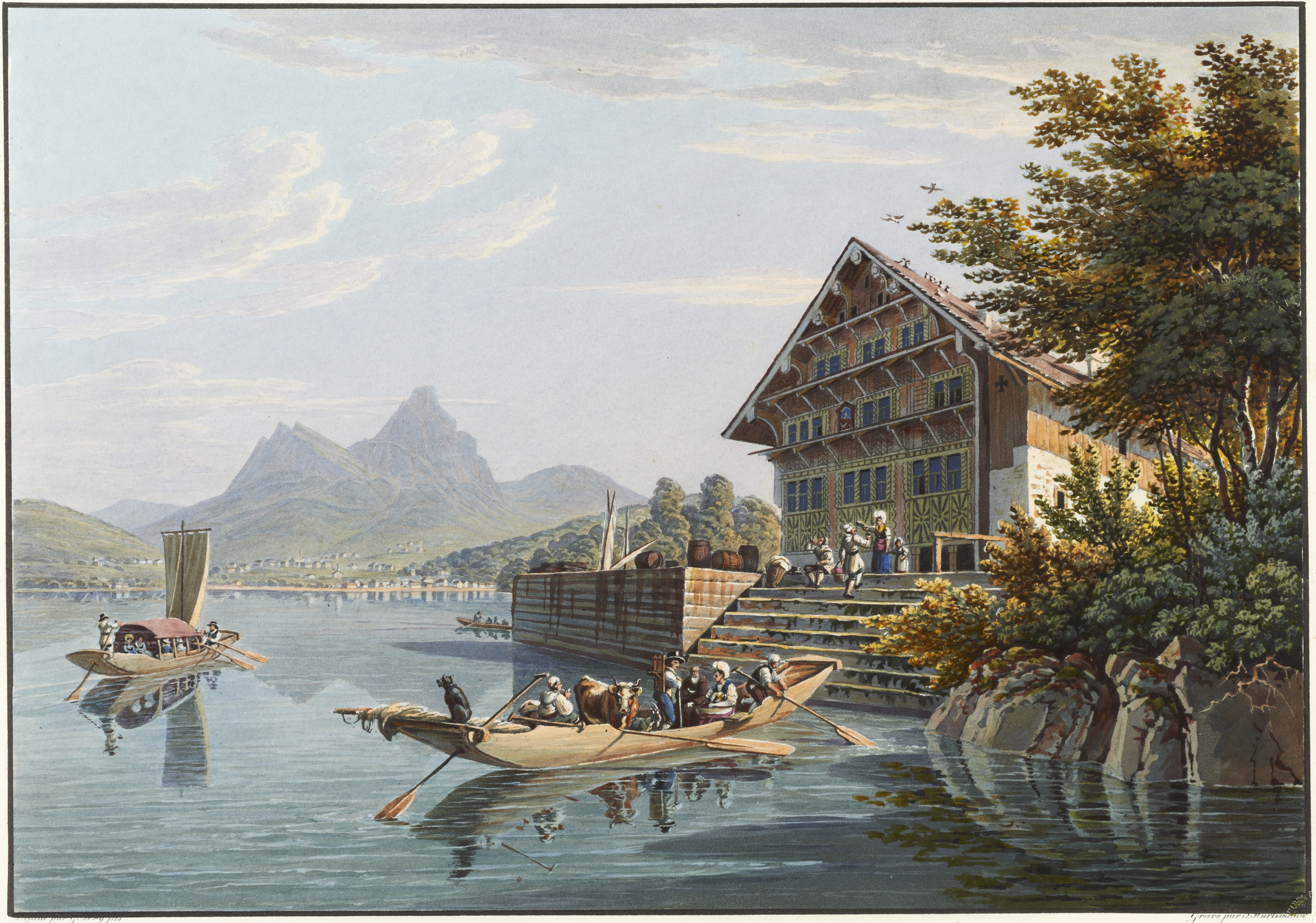
Treib, 1825

Treib is a small lakeside community and landing stage on the shore of Lake Lucerne and in the Swiss canton of Uri. It forms part of the municipality of Seelisberg, to the centre of which it is linked by the Treib–Seelisberg funicular. The landing stage is a regular calling point of the passenger boats of Schifffahrtsgesellschaft des Vierwaldstättersees, which provide links to the city of Lucerne and many other lakeside communities.
