= Riemenstalden =

- Municipality
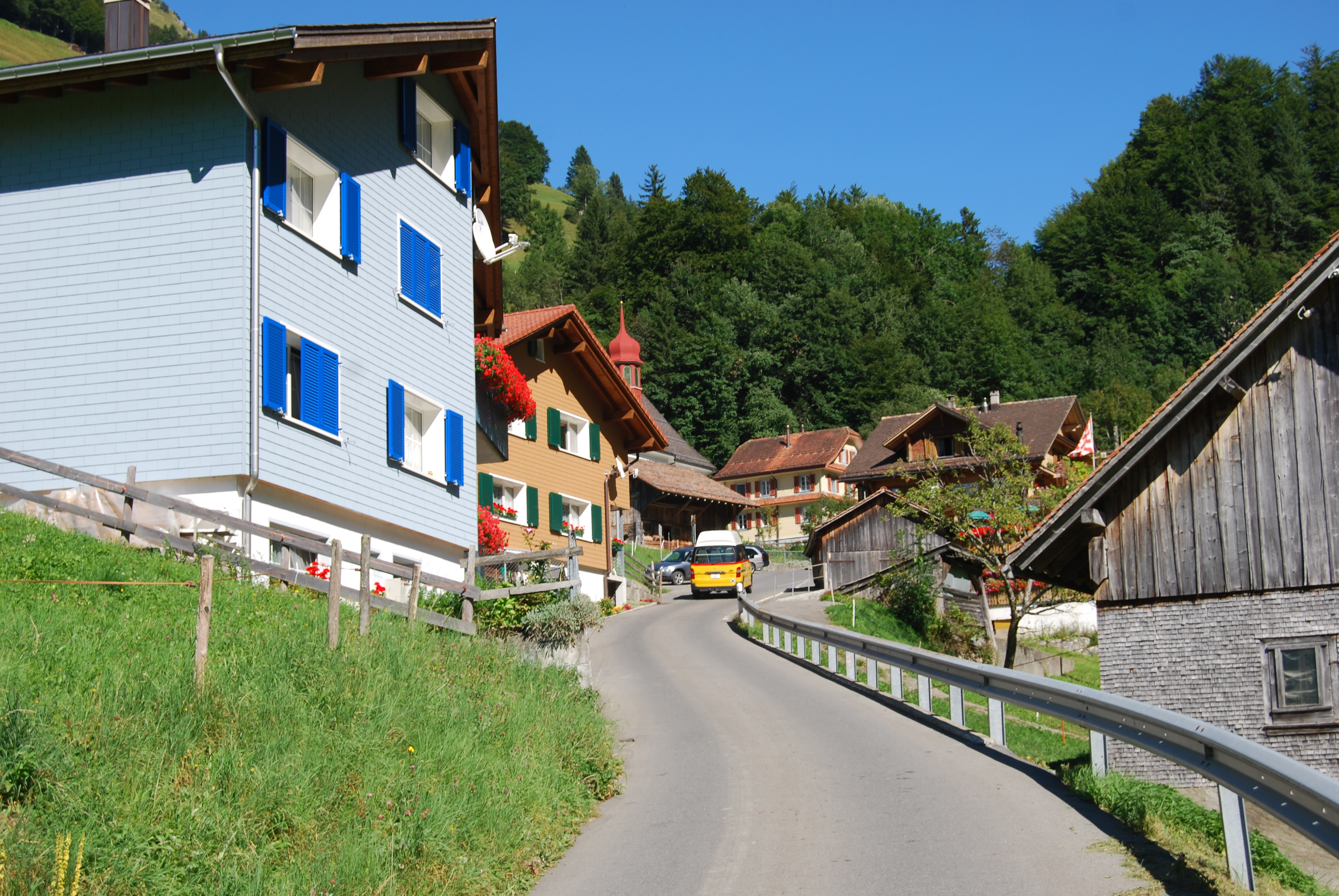

- Coat of arms
- Location of Riemenstalden
- Location within Switzerland Location within Canton of Schwyz
- Coordinates: 46°56′N 8°39′E
- Country: Switzerland
- Canton: Schwyz
- District: Schwyz

Area
  - Total: 11.20 km^{2} (4.32 sq mi)
- Elevation: 1,030 m (3,380 ft)

Population (December 2020)
  - Total: 86
  - Density: 7.7/km^{2} (20/sq mi)
- Time zone: UTC+01:00 (CET)
  - Summer (DST): UTC+02:00 (CEST)
- Postal code: 6452
- SFOS number: 1369
- ISO 3166 code: CH-SZ
- Surrounded by: Bürglen (UR), Morschach, Muotathal, Sisikon (UR)
- Website: www.riemenstalden.ch

Riemenstalden is a municipality in Schwyz District in the canton of Schwyz in Switzerland. The villages can be reached by road from Sisikon (Canton of Uri).

== Geography ==
Riemenstalden has an area, as of 2006, of 11.2 km^{2} (4.3 sq mi). Of this area, 49.3% is used for agricultural purposes, while 25.5% is forested. Of the rest of the land, 0.2% is settled (buildings or roads) and the remainder (25%) is non-productive (rivers, glaciers or mountains).

Alplersee is located on the slopes of Rophaien.

== Demographics ==
Riemenstalden has a population (as of 31 December 2020) of 86. As of 2007, 2.4% of the population was made up of foreign nationals. Over the last 10 years the population has grown at a rate of 20%. All of the population (as of 2000) speaks German.

As of 2000 the gender distribution of the population was 57.6% male and 42.4% female. The age distribution, as of 2008, in Riemenstalden is; 12 people or 20.3% of the population is between 0 and 19. 15 people or 25.4% are 20 to 39, and 18 people or 30.5% are 40 to 64. The senior population distribution is 10 people or 16.9% are 65 to 74. There are 3 people or 5.1% who are 70 to 79 and 1 person or 1.69% of the population who is over 80.

As of 2000 there are 24 households, of which 6 households (or about 25.0%) contain only a single individual.

In the 2007 election the most popular party was the SVP which received 59.5% of the vote. The next three most popular parties were the CVP (26.2%), the SPS (7.1%) and the FDP (6%).

In Riemenstalden about 40% of the population (between age 25-64) have completed either non-mandatory upper secondary education or additional higher education (either university or a Fachhochschule).

Riemenstalden has an unemployment rate of 0%. As of 2005, there were 23 people employed in the primary economic sector and about 10 businesses involved in this sector. No one is employed in the secondary sector. 11 people are employed in the tertiary sector, with 3 businesses in this sector.

From the 2000 census, 59 or 100.0% are Roman Catholic.

The historical population is given in the following table:

year	population
1950	79
1960	63
1970	88
1980	91
1985	84
1990	81
2000	65
2005	75
2007	84
