= Seeli (Seelisberg) =

Lake in Uri, Switzerland

Seeli Seelisbergsee
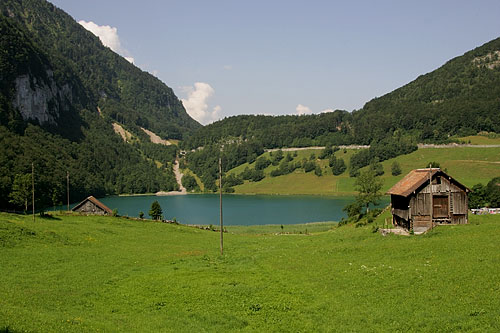

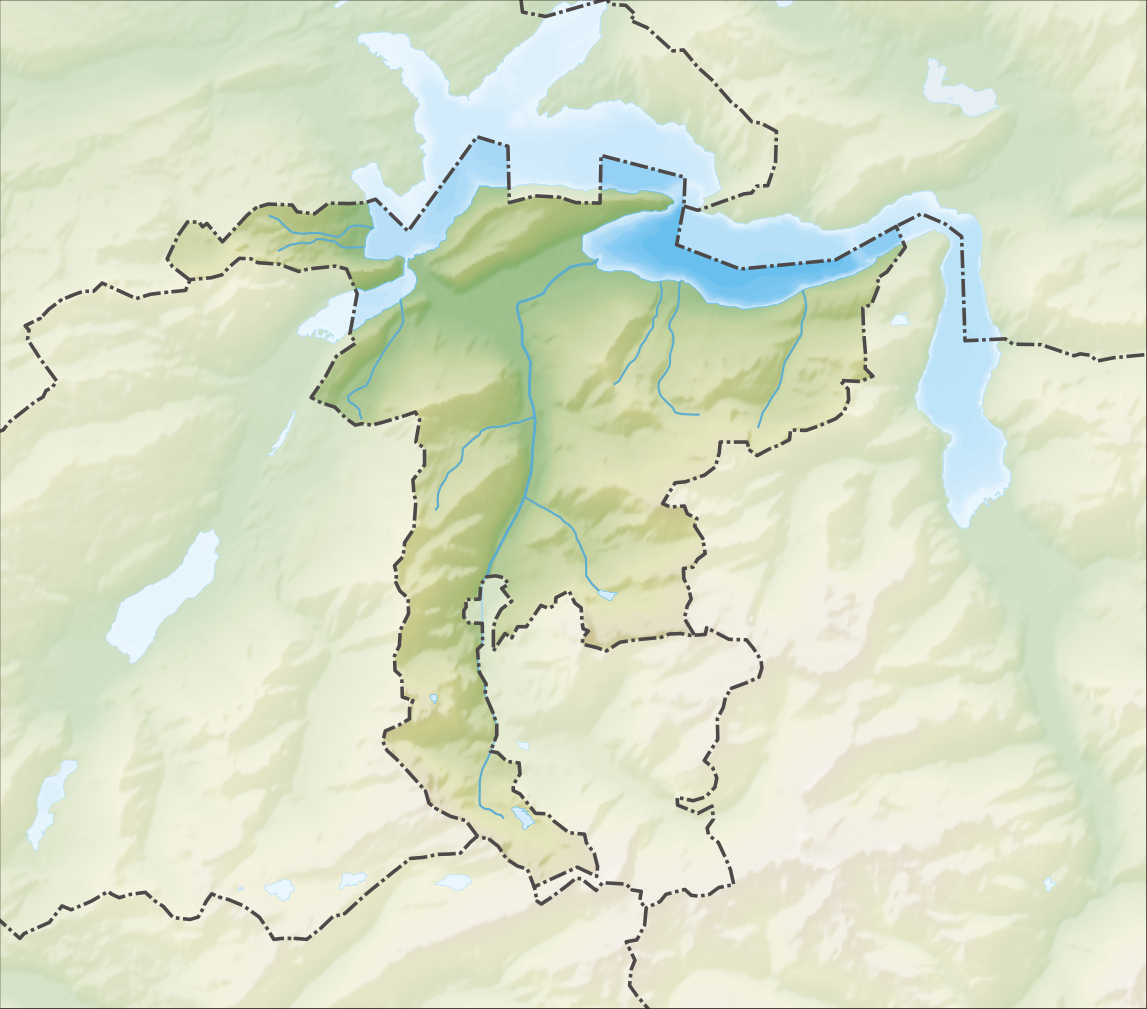
- Location within Canton of Uri Location within Canton of Nidwalden Location within Switzerland Location within Alps
- Interactive map of Seeli; Seelisbergsee
- Location: Seelisberg, Uri
- Coordinates: 46°57′31″N 8°34′19″E
- Basin countries: Switzerland
- Surface area: 18 ha (44 acres)
- Max. depth: 37 m (121 ft)
- Surface elevation: 738 m (2,421 ft)

Seeli (literally "small lake") or Seelisbergsee is the lake on Seelisberg in Uri, Switzerland, that gives the place its name. Its surface area is 18 ha (44 acres).
