= Seelisberg Tunnel =

Motorway tunnel in Switzerland

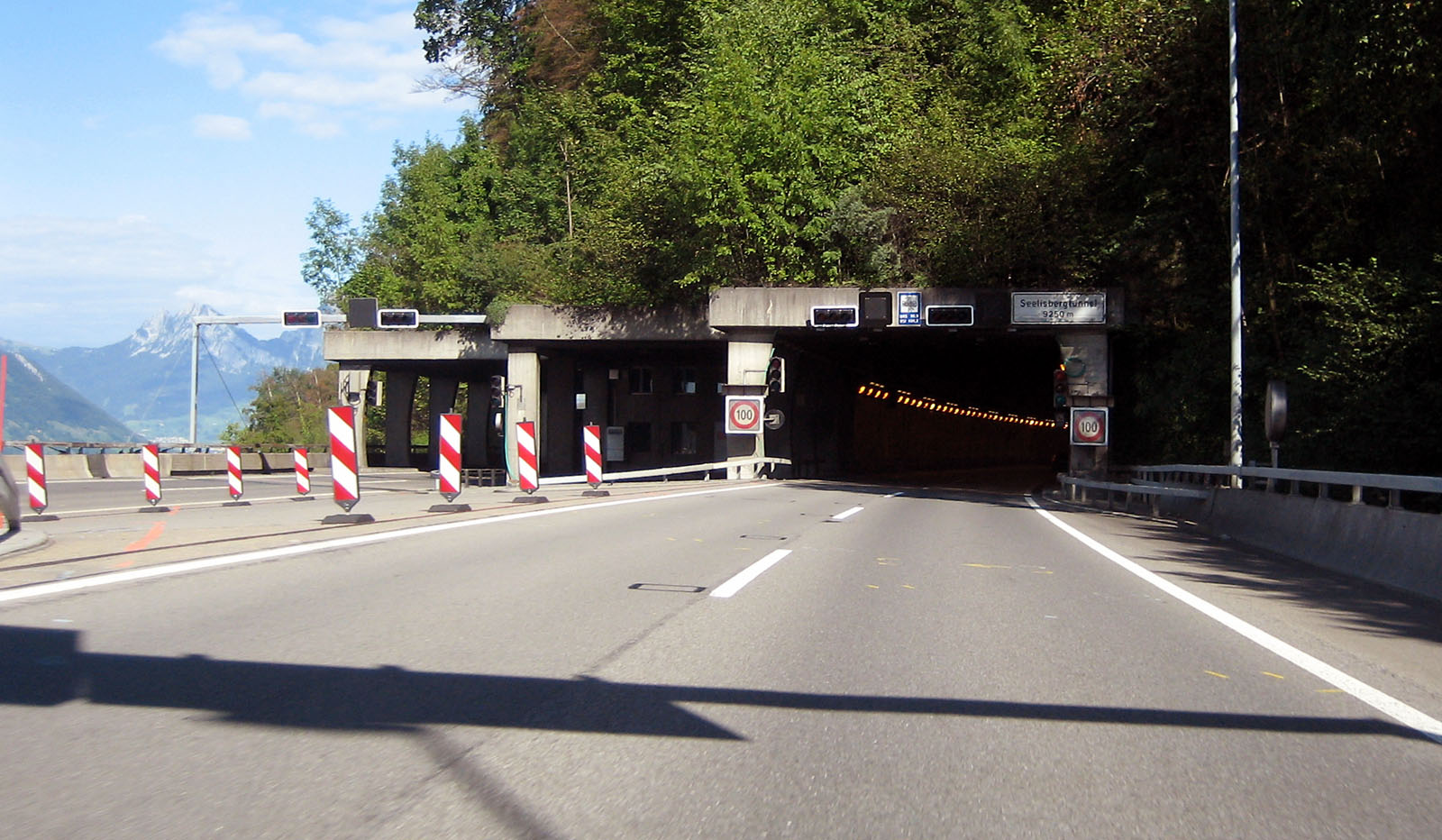
- North portal of the Seelisberg Tunnel
- Interactive map of Seelisberg Tunnel

Overview
- Location: Nidwalden/Uri, Switzerland
- Coordinates: 46°56′49″N 8°32′59″E
- Status: Active
- Route: A2 motorway
- Start: Beckenried
- End: Seedorf

Operation
- Opened: 1980
- Character: road

Technical
- Length: 9,250 metres (30,350 ft); 9,292 metres (30,486 ft)
- No. of lanes: 4

The Seelisberg Tunnel is a motorway tunnel in Switzerland. The tunnel links Beckenried, in the canton of Nidwalden, with Seedorf, in the canton of Uri, running under the mountains that form the south shore of Lake Lucerne. It forms part of the A2 motorway between Basel, on the border with Germany and France, and Chiasso, on the border with Italy. Completed in 1980, the twin bores of the tunnel are 9,250 metres (30,350 ft) and 9,292 metres (30,486 ft) in length.

After the Gotthard Road Tunnel, this is Switzerland's second-longest road tunnel but unlike the Gotthard Tunnel which crosses the Alps completely north to south, the Seelisberg Tunnel is situated only in the northern side of Alps. The Seelisberg tunnel can be considered to be the longest Swiss twin tube Road tunnel with split traffic (Southbound in one bore, and Northbound in another one).

The accident rate in the Seelisberg tunnel is very low. Most fatal accidents happened during bidirectional traffic, when the other tube was closed.

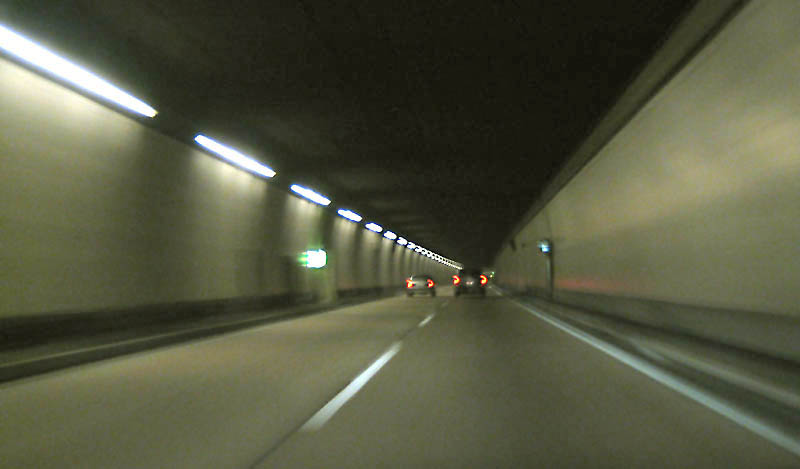
Interior (2006)
