= Alberich Zwyssig =

Cistercian monk, composed the Swiss national anthem

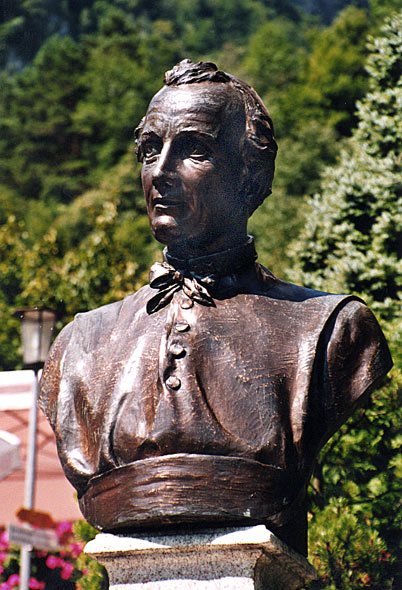
Bust of Zwyssig in Bauen.

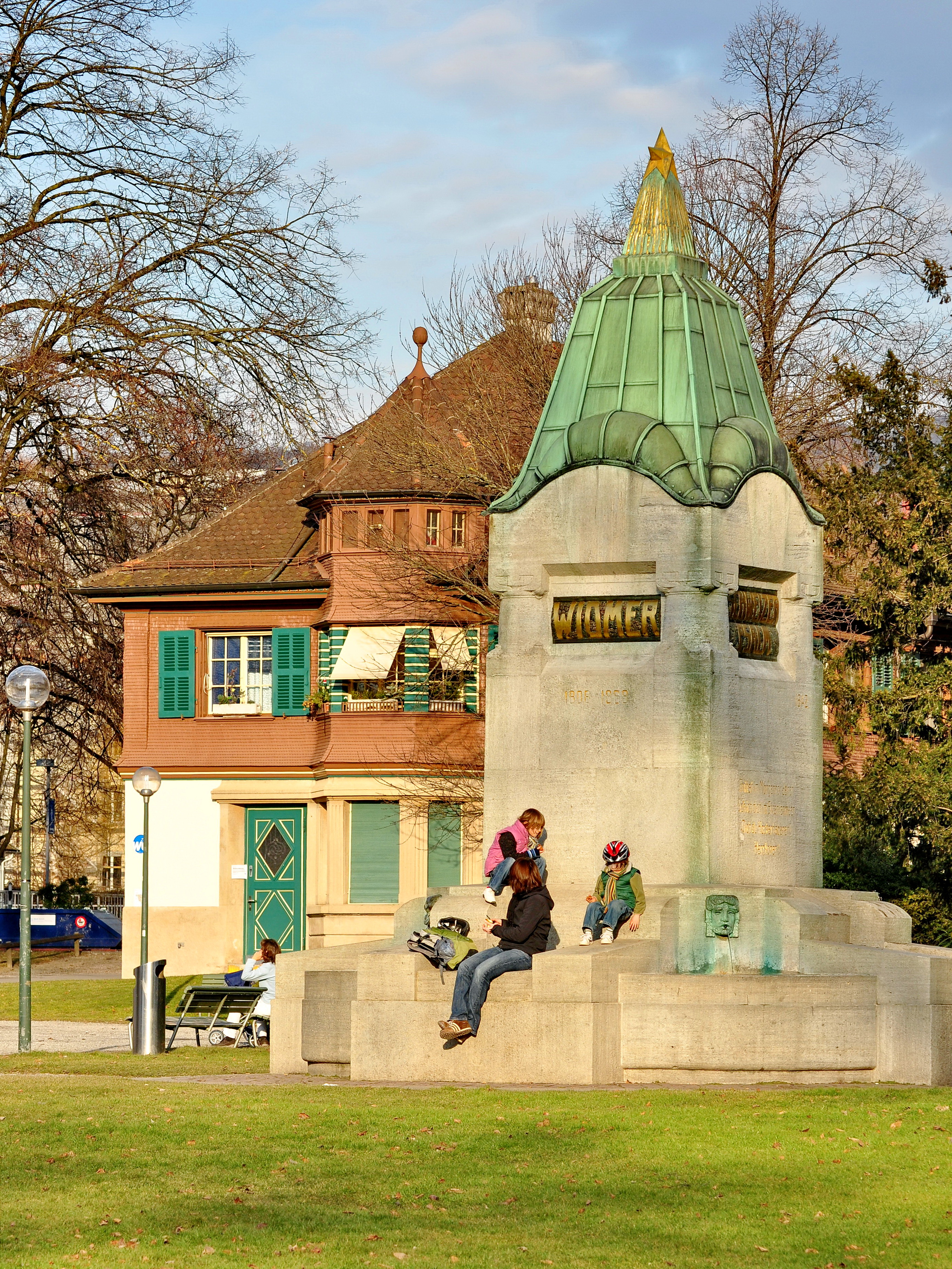
Fountain memorial for the composer Alberich Zwyssig and the Swiss Psalm's poet Leonhard Widmer in Zürich-Seefeld (Zürichhorn).

Father Alberich or Alberik Zwyssig (17 November 1808 – 18 November 1854) was a Cistercian monk who composed in 1841 the Swiss Psalm, the present Swiss national anthem.

== Life ==
Johann Josef Maria Zwyssig (he took the name "Alberich" later as his name in religion) was born in 1808 in Bauen, Canton of Uri. From 1821 to 1841 he lived in Wettingen Abbey, first as a choir boy and pupil in the monastery school, and later as a monk and priest. He was also a teacher, secretary to the abbot and choirmaster.

After the dissolution of the abbey by the Grand Council of the Canton of Aargau on 13 January 1841 the monks wandered from place to place for several years. After the Sonderbundskrieg Zwyssig spent six years as a guest in Wurmsbach Abbey at Jona on Lake Zürich. He was in charge of teaching music at their newly founded daughter institute, and wrote many compositions both religious and secular. In 1854 the wandering monks at last came to Vorarlberg on 8 June 1854 the former monastery at Mehrerau in Bregenz, which had been secularised in 1806 by the Bavarian state, was re-founded as a Cistercian monastery by Abbot Leopold Hoechle from Wettingen with seven priests and three brothers. Zwyssig participated in the new foundation as a cantor but died there within a few months, on 18 November 1854.
