= Lake Lucerne =

Lake in Central Switzerland

- Vierwaldstättersee (German)
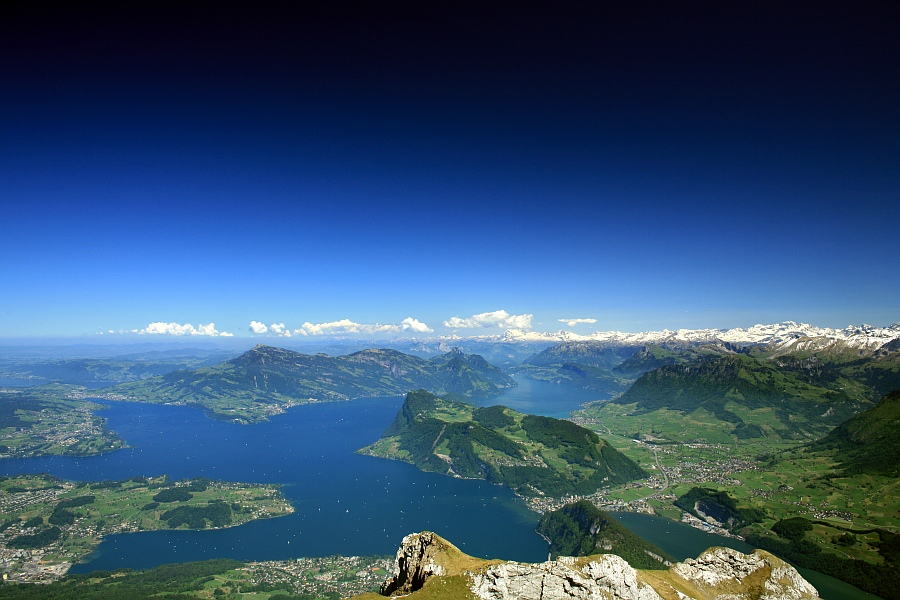
- View of Lake Lucerne from the Pilatus

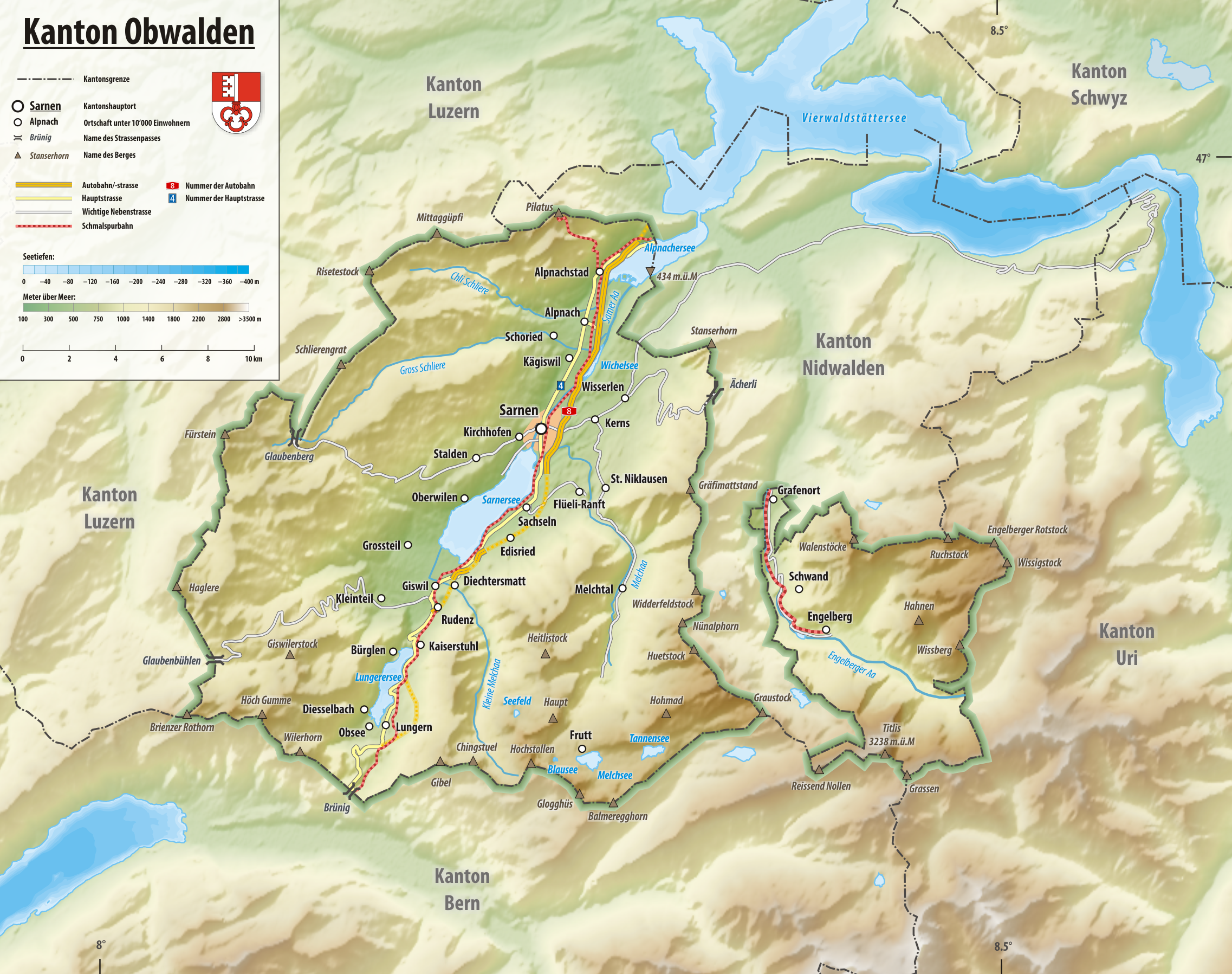
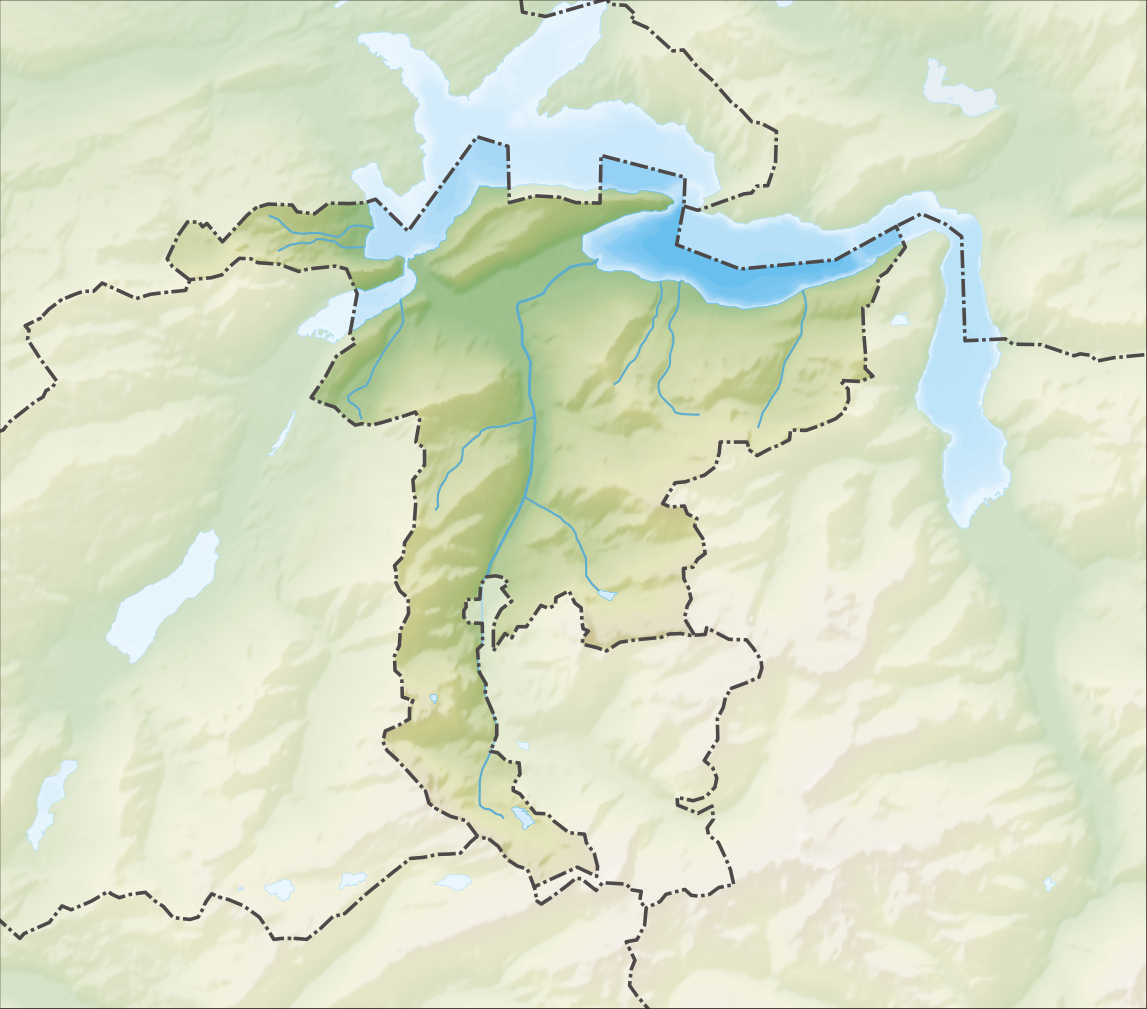
- Location within Canton of Obwalden Location within Canton of Lucerne Location within Canton of Nidwalden Location within Canton of Schwyz Location within Canton of Uri Location within Switzerland Location within Alps
- Interactive map of Lake Lucerne
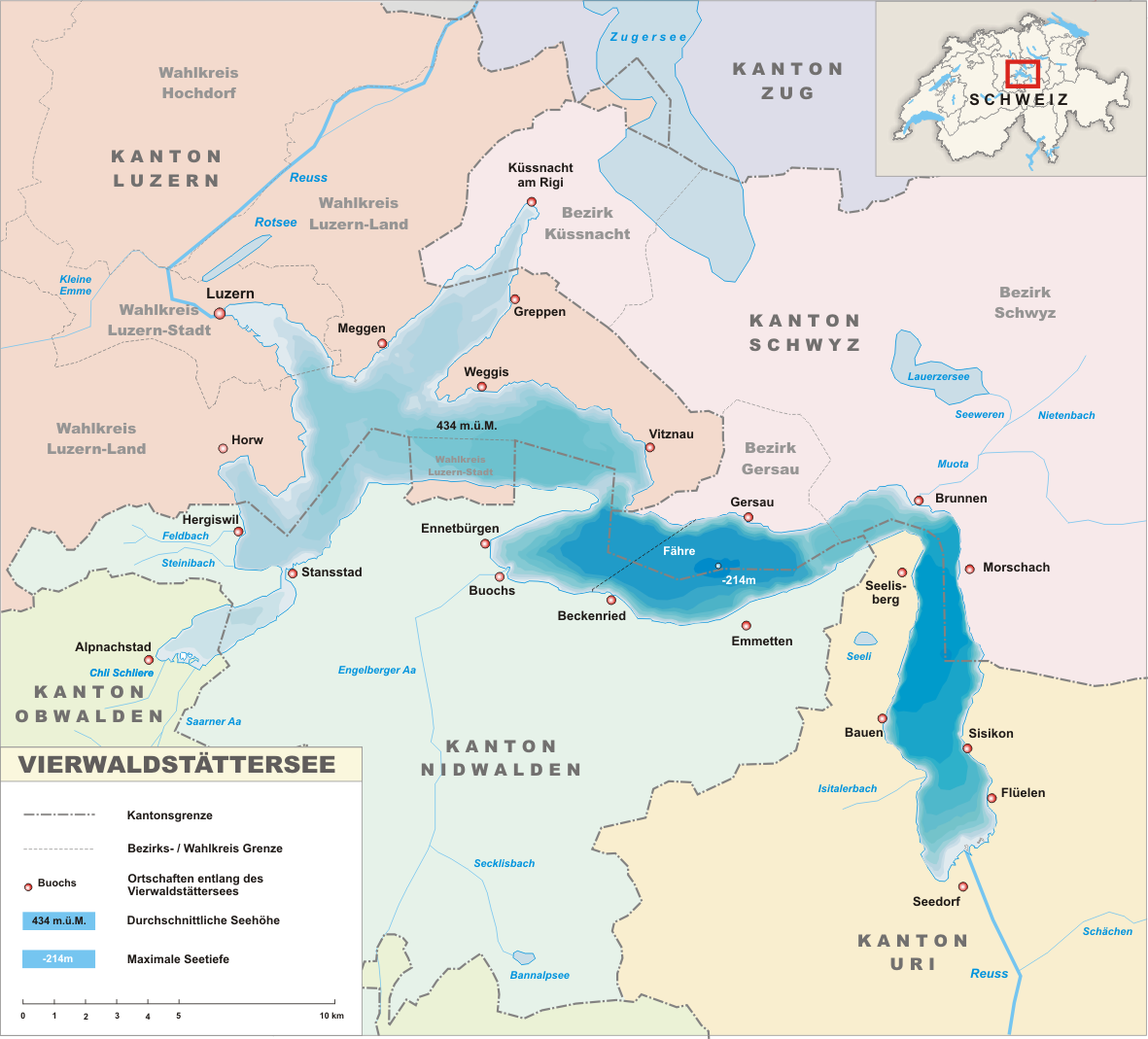
- map
- Location: Central Switzerland
- Coordinates: 47.0194°N 8.4011°E
- Lake type: freshwater fjord, recent regulation (Note: The weir in Lucerne keeps the water level 2–3 m (6 ft 7 in – 9 ft 10 in) above the natural average, see Canton of Lucerne, department of traffic and infrastructure (2008):Die Regulierung des Vierwaldstädtersees – Der Ausbau der Reusswehranlage in Luzern (PDF) Archived 14 May 2014 at the Wayback Machine)
- Primary inflows: Reuss; Muota; Engelberger Aa; Sarner Aa
- Primary outflows: Reuss
- Catchment area: 2,124 km^{2} (820 sq mi)
- Basin countries: Switzerland
- Max. length: 30 km (19 mi)
- Max. width: 20 km (12 mi)
- Surface area: 113.6 km^{2} (43.9 sq mi)
- Average depth: 104 m (341 ft)
- Max. depth: 214 m (702 ft)
- Water volume: 11.8 km^{3} (2.8 cu mi)
- Residence time: 3.4 years
- Shore length^{1}: 143.7 km (89.3 mi)
- Surface elevation: 434 m (1,424 ft)
- Frozen: in the 17th and 19th century; Lucerne Bay and Lake Alpnach in 1929 and 1963
- Islands: Altstatt-Insel
- Sections/sub-basins: Urnersee; Gersauer Becken; Buochser Bucht; Vitznauer Bucht; Chrütztrichter; Küssnachtersee; Alpnachersee; Stanser Trichter; Horwer Bucht; Luzernersee
- Settlements: Flüelen; Brunnen; Gersau; Buochs; Vitznau; Weggis; Küssnacht; Alpnachstad; Stansstad; Hergiswil; Lucerne
- Website: http://www.lakelucerne.ch
- ^{1} Shore length is not a well-defined measure.

Lake Lucerne (German: Vierwaldstättersee, literally 'Lake of the four forested settlements' (in English usually translated as forest cantons); French: lac des Quatre-Cantons; Italian: lago dei Quattro Cantoni) is a lake in central Switzerland and the fourth largest in the country.

== Name ==
The name of Vierwaldstättersee is first used in the 16th century. Before the 16th century, the entire lake was known as Luzerner See "Lake Lucerne", as remains the English (and partly Italian, as Lago di Lucerna) usage. The (three) "Waldstätte(n)" (lit.: "forested sites/settlements", in English usually translated as forest cantons) since the 14th century were the confederate allies of Uri, Schwyz and Unterwalden. The notion of "Four Waldstätten" (Vier Waldstätten), with the addition of the canton of Lucerne, is first recorded in the 1450s, in an addition to the "Silver Book" of Egloff Etterlin of Lucerne.

== History ==
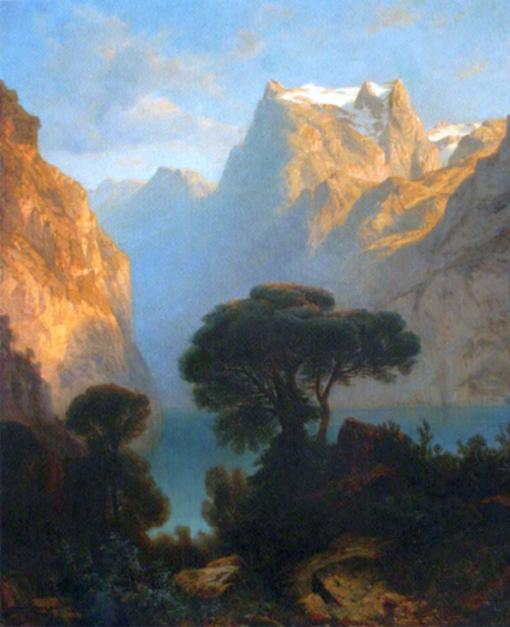
The Lake of the four Cantons by Alexandre Calame, c. 1850, National Museum, Warsaw

Lake Lucerne was formed at the end of the last ice age, from the meltwater of the Reuss Glacier. The glacier melted from 20,000 to 15,000 BCE to create many of the lakes in central Switzerland.

Archaeologists surveying the lake-bed (during the construction of a pipeline) from 2019 to 2021 found the remains of a Bronze Age village with artifacts dating to around 1000 BCE. Later, the new findings indicated that the area was settled 2,000 years earlier than historians previously thought.

The lake was used as an axis for transportation since at least the opening of the Gotthard Pass in 1230 as a major route through the Alps, due to its location at the center of the corridor. The lake was the only connection through the route until 1863. The first steamer, the Stadt Luzern, began operation in 1837, modernizing transport of goods and passengers across the lake.

The Swiss Armed Forces historically used Lake Lucerne as a dumping ground for old munitions, with an estimated 3,300 tonnes of munitions currently submerged in the lake. The Swiss Defence Department has offered a prize of 50,000 francs (£45,000) for the best proposal to safely remove the munitions.

== Geography ==
Lake Lucerne and surroundings on the Swiss National Map (1:25'000)

The lake has an irregular shape, with several sharp bends and four arms. The nine different parts of the lake each have individual designations:

- Urnersee ("Lake of Uri"): The first part of the lake, at the mouth of the Reuss between Flüelen and Brunnen.
- Gersauer Becken ("Basin of Gersau") next to Gersau below the Rigi massif is the deepest part of the lake.
- Buochser Bucht ("Bay of Buochs"): The bay of Bouchs, where the Engelberger Aa enters the lake.
- Vitznauer Bucht ("Bay of Vitznau"): The part between the Bürgenstock and Rigi.
- Alpnachersee ("Lake of Alpnach"): the almost separate, southern arm below the southern mountainside of Pilatus near Alpnach.
- Stanser Trichter ("Funnel of Stans"): The part north of the Pilatus, west of Bürgenstock, and in front of Hergiswil and Stansstad.
- Küssnachtersee ("Lake of Küssnacht"): The most northern arm, west of the Rigi with Küssnacht SZ at its northern end.
- Chrütztrichter ("Cross Funnel"): The meeting point of Stanser Trichter, Luzernersee, Küssnachtersee, and Vitznauer Bucht.
- Luzernersee ("Lake of Lucerne"): in German usage now limited to the bay at Lucerne as far as Meggenhorn, with its effluence of the Reuss.

Lake Lucerne starts in the south–north bound Reuss Valley between steep cliffs above the Urnersee from Flüelen towards Brunnen to the north before it makes a sharp bend to the west where it continues into the Gersauer Becken. Here is also the deepest point of the lake with 214 m (702 ft). Even further west of it is the Buochser Bucht, but the lake sharply turns north again through the narrow opening between the Unter Nas (lower nose) of the Bürgenstock to the west and the Ober Nas (upper nose) of the Rigi to the east to reach the Vitznauer Bucht. In front of Vitznau below the Rigi the lake turns sharply west again to reach the center of a four-arm cross, called the Chrütztrichter (Cross Funnel). Here converge the Vitznauer Bucht with the Küssnachtersee from the north, the Luzernersee from the west, and the Horwer Bucht and the Stanser Trichter to the south, which is to be found right below the northeast side of the Pilatus and the west side of the Bürgenstock. At the very narrow pass between the east dropper of the Pilatus (called Lopper) and Stansstad the lake reaches its southwestern arm at Alpnachstad on the steep southern foothills of the Pilatus, the Alpnachersee. The lake drains its water into the Reuss in Lucerne from its arm called Luzernersee (which literally translates as Lake of Lucerne).

The entire lake has a total area of 114 km^{2} (44 sq mi) at an elevation of 434 m (1,424 ft) a.s.l., and a maximum depth of 214 m (702 ft). Its volume is 11.8 km^{3}. Much of the shoreline rises steeply into mountains up to 1,500 m above the lake, resulting in many picturesque views including those of the mountains Rigi and Pilatus.

The Reuss enters the lake at Flüelen, in the part called Urnersee (Lake of Uri, in the canton of Uri) and exits at Lucerne. The lake also receives the Muota at Brunnen, the Engelberger Aa at Buochs, and the Sarner Aa at Alpnachstad.

It is possible to circumnavigate the lake by train and road, though the railway route circumvents the lake even on the north side of the Rigi via Arth-Goldau. Since 1980, the A2 motorway leads through the Seelisberg Tunnel in order to reach the route to the Gotthard Pass in just half an hour in Altdorf, Uri right south of the beginning of the lake in Flüelen.

Steamers and other passenger boats ply between the different villages and towns on the lake. It is a popular tourist destination, both for native Swiss and foreigners, and there are many hotels and resorts along the shores. In addition, the meadow of the Rütli, traditional site of the founding of the Swiss Confederation, is on the Urnersee shore. A 35 km commemorative walkway, the Swiss Path, was built around the Lake of Uri to celebrate the country's 700th anniversary in 1991.

Lake Lucerne borders on the three original Swiss cantons of Uri, Schwyz, and Unterwalden (which today is divided into the cantons of Obwalden and Nidwalden), as well as the canton of Lucerne, thus the name Vierwaldstättersee (lit.: Lake of the Four Forested Settlements). Many of the oldest communities of Switzerland are along the shore, including Küssnacht, Weggis, Vitznau, Gersau, Brunnen, Altdorf, Buochs, and Treib.

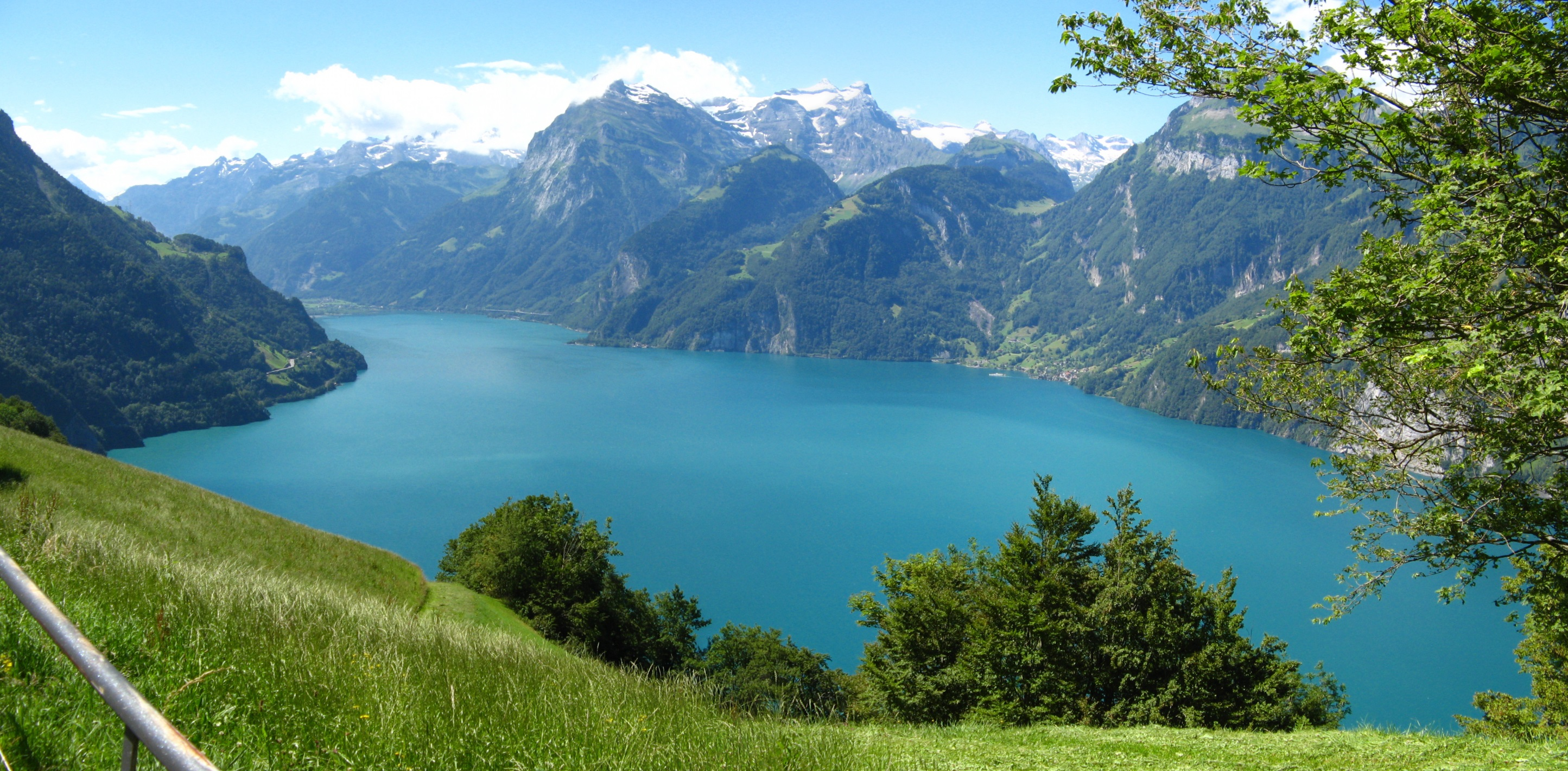
View of the Urnersee from near Morschach in Uri, southwards, with Bauen on the left shore on the right

Lake Lucerne is singularly irregular and appears to lie in four different valleys, all related to the conformation of the adjoining mountains. The central portion of the lake lies in two parallel valleys whose direction is from west to east, the one lying north, the other south of the ridge of the Bürgenstock. These are connected through a narrow strait, scarcely one kilometre wide, between the two rocky promontories called respectively Unter Nas and Ober Nas (Lower and Upper Nose). It is not unlikely that the southern of these two divisions of the lake—called Buochser Bucht—formerly extended to the west over the isthmus whereon stands the town of Stans, thus forming an island of the Bürgenstock. The west end of the main branch of the lake, whence a comparatively shallow bay extends to the town of Lucerne, is intersected obliquely by a deep trench whose south-west end is occupied by the branch called Alpnachersee, while the north-east branch forms the long arm of Küssnacht, Küssnachtersee. These both lie in the direct line of a valley that stretches with scarcely a break in between the Uri Alps and the Emmental Alps. At the eastern end of the Gersauer Becken, where the containing walls of the lake-valley are directed from east to west, it is joined at an acute angle by the arm of Uri, or the Urnersee, lying in the northern prolongation of the deep cleft that gives a passage to the Reuss, between the Uri Alps and the Glarus Alps.

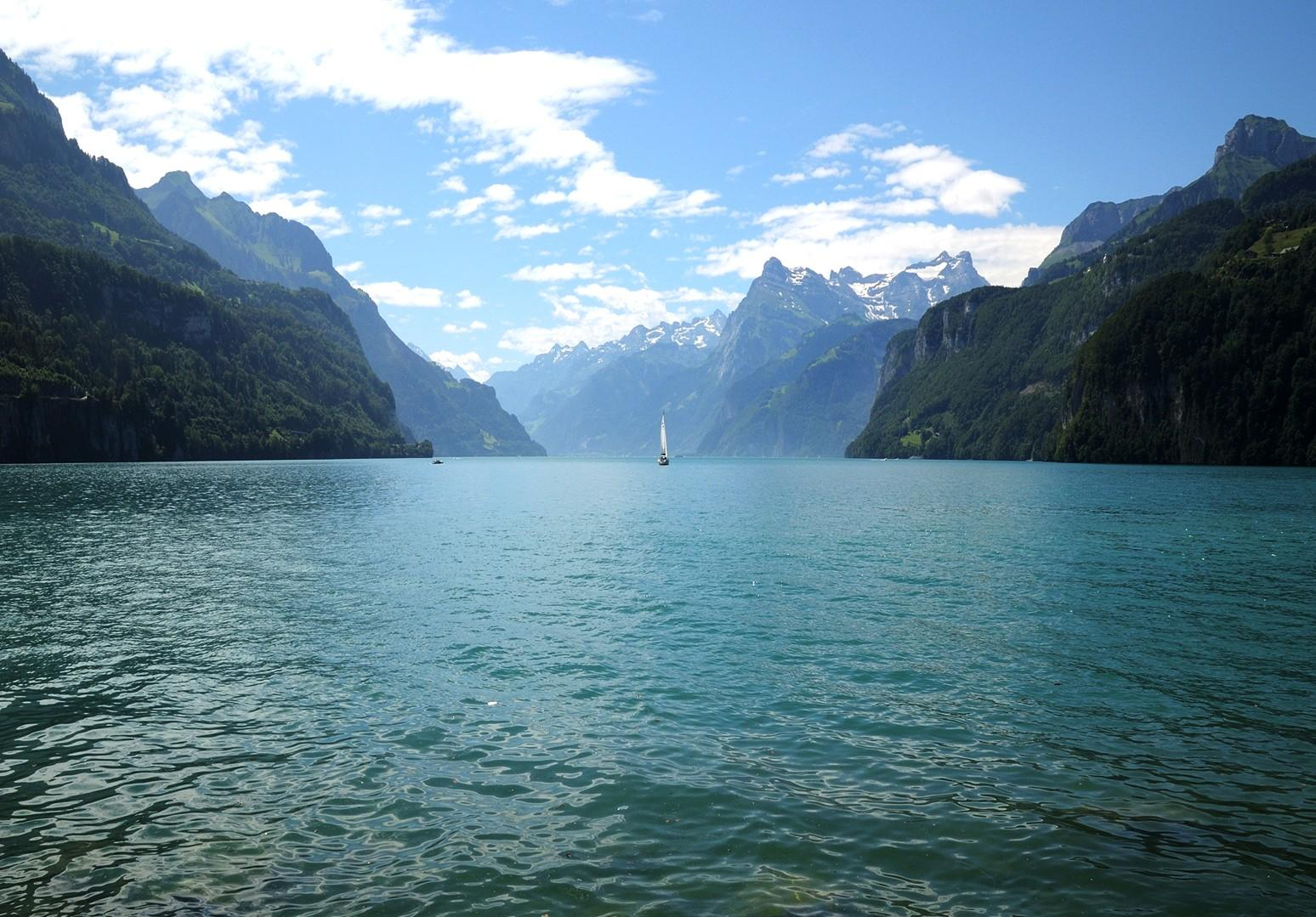
View of the Lake of Uri from Brunnen southwards

The Urnersee occupies the northernmost and deep portion of the great cleft of the Reuss Valley, which has cut through the Alpine ranges from the St Gotthard Pass to the neighbourhood of Schwyz. From its eastern shore the mountains rise in almost bare walls of rock to a height of from 3,000 to 4,000 ft (910 to 1,220 m) above the water. The two highest summits are the Fronalpstock and the Rophaien (2078 m). Between them the steep glen or ravine of the Riemenstaldener Tal descends to Sisikon, the only village with Flüelen right on the shore on that side of the Urnersee. On the opposite or western shore, the mountains attain still greater dimensions. The Niederbauen Chulm is succeeded by the Oberbauenstock, and farther south, above the ridge of the Scharti, appear the snowy peaks of the Gitschen and the Uri Rotstock (2,928 m). In the centre opens the Reuss Valley, backed by the rugged summits of the Urner and Glarner Alps.

The breadth of these various sections of the lake is very variable, but is usually between one and two miles (3 km). The lake's surface, whose mean height above the sea is 434 metres, is the lowest point of the cantons of Uri, Obwalden and Nidwalden. Originally the lake was susceptible to variations in level and flooding along its shoreline. Between 1859 and 1860, the introduction of a needle dam in the Reuss in the city of Lucerne, just upstream from the Spreuerbrücke, allowed the lake level to be stabilised.

The culminating point of the lake's drainage basin, as well as Central Switzerland, is the Dammastock at 3,630 metres above sea level.

== Settlements ==
| Left shore (Note: At the entry of the Reuss: the western, later southern shore.) | Right shore |
|---|---|
| Uri (UR); Seedorf; Bolzbach (Seedorf); Isleten (Bauen); Bauen; Seelisberg with Treib and Rütli; Nidwalden (NW); Emmetten; Beckenried; Buochs; Ennetbürgen; Bürgenstock (Ennetbürgen); Kehrsiten (Stansstad); Stansstad; Stansstader Ried (Stansstad); Rotzloch; Obwalden (OW); Alpnachstad; NW; Hergiswil; Lucerne (LU); Horw; Kastanienbaum (Horw); St. Niklausen (Horw) | UR; Flüelen; Sisikon; Schwyz (SZ); Morschach; Brunnen; Gersau; LU; Vitznau; Weggis; Greppen; SZ; Küssnacht am Rigi; Merlischachen (Küssnacht); LU; Meggen |
Luzern

== Use ==
=== Navigation ===
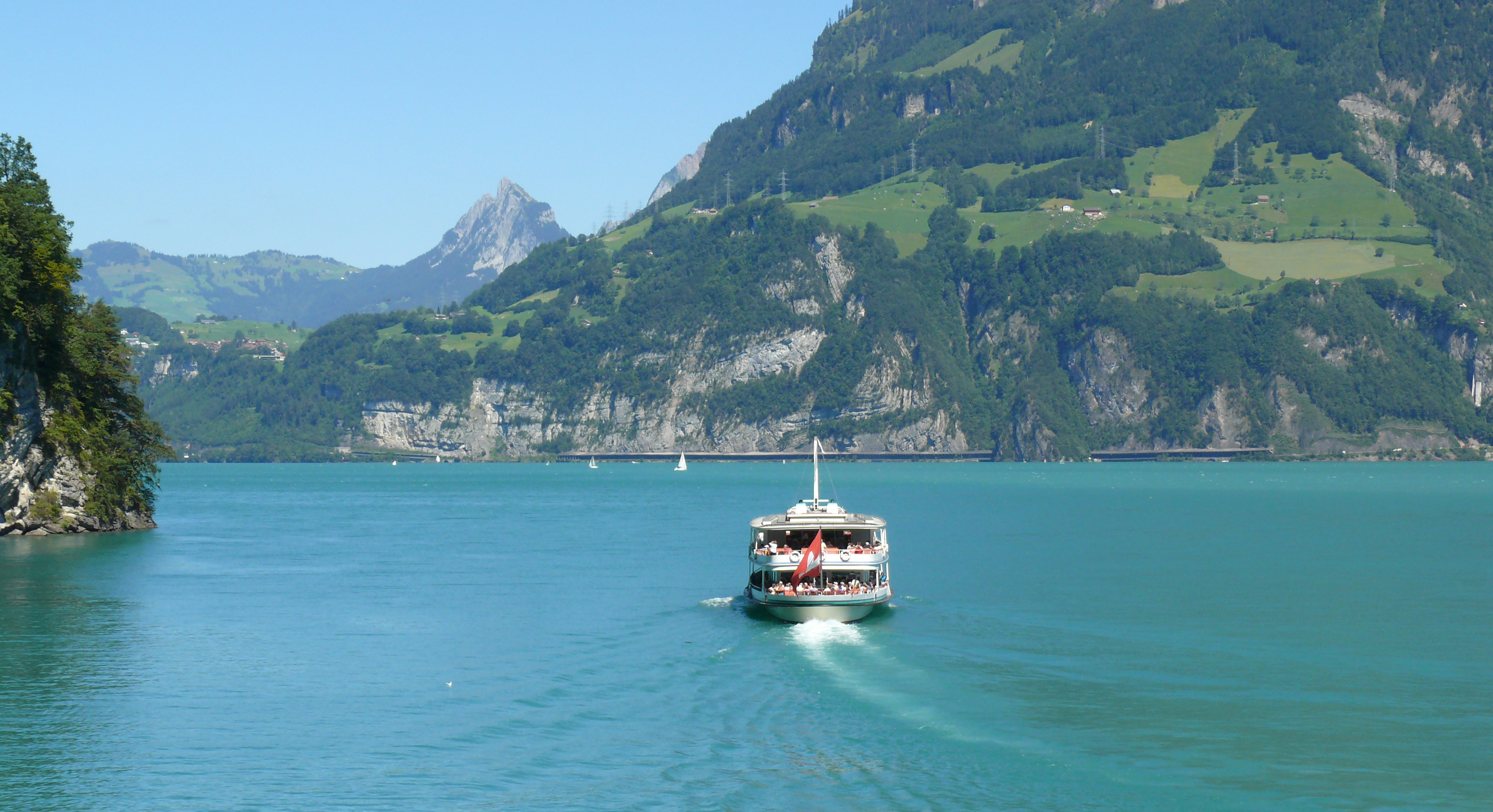
Passenger boat on the Urnersee with the view of the Axenstrasse

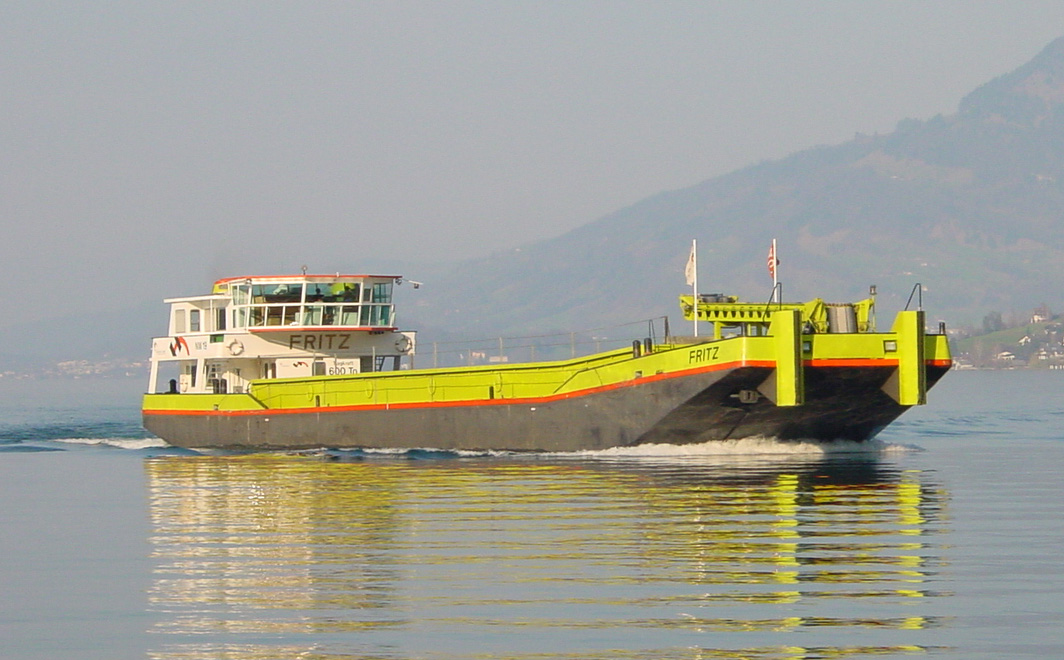
A Nauen (barge) in use on the lake

The lake is navigable, and has formed an important part of Switzerland's transport system for many centuries, and at least since the opening of the first track across the Gotthard Pass in 1230. This trade grew with the opening of a new mail coach road across the pass in 1830. This road had its northern terminus at Flüelen at the extreme eastern end of the lake, and the lake provided the only practical onward link to Lucerne, and hence the cities of northern Switzerland and beyond.

Whilst the development of Switzerland's road and rail networks has relieved the lake of much of its through traffic, it continues to be used by a considerable number of vessels, both private and public. Much of this usage is tourist or leisure oriented, but the lake continues to provide practical public and cargo transport links between the smaller lakeside communities.

Passenger boats of the Schifffahrtsgesellschaft des Vierwaldstättersees (SGV) provide services on the lake, including many run by historic paddle steamers. The SGV serves 32 places along the shore of the lake, with interchange to both main line and mountain railways at various points. Under separate management, the Autofähre Beckenried-Gersau provides a car ferry service between Beckenried, on the south bank of the lake, and Gersau on the north.

Cargo barges, to a local design known as Nauen, are still used on the lake. Some have been converted for use as party boats. Other barges are used by the gravel dredging industry that operates on the lake, using large dredgers to obtain sand and gravel for use in the construction industry.

=== Watersports ===
Lake Lucerne has twice been used as a venue for the European Rowing Championships: in 1908 and then in 1926. The nearby Rotsee has since 1933 been used for rowing regattas instead.

Different sports are possible in some separate areas due to the water and wind conditions. The lake is accessible from boat and yacht harbors, to lake resorts and pools (e.g. the Lido pool in Lucerne, built in 1929 by Arnold Berger). Therefore, the lake can be easily accessible from both shores. The See-Club Luzern was founded in 1881, which is now Switzerland's largest rowing club, as well as the Reuss Luzern rowing club (Ruderclub Reuss Luzern) in 1904. The Lucerne Yacht Club (Yachtclub Luzern) has existed since 1941 and has been running since 1966 a boathouse and buoy field on Churchill-Quai in Lucerne.

The Brunnen water sports club (Wassersportclub Brunnen), founded in 1958, held on Lake Lucerne in the first years of its existence international motorboat races and water ski championships. In 1965 the association chose a new name for the club: Lake Lucerne Water Sports Club (Wassersport-Club Vierwaldstättersee). The Central Switzerland Motorboat Club (Motorbootclub Zentralschweiz) was established in 1980 and the Hergiswil Water Sports Club (Wassersportclub Hergiswil) in 1986. SchweizMobil has created a canoe tour across Lake Lucerne between Brunnen and Gersau. Due to the wind in the Reuss Valley, the southern part of Lake Uri between the campground at Gruonbachstrand in Flüelen and Isleten is a center of windsurfing.

There are about ten places where you can dive without a boat in Lake Lucerne. The water is rather chilly all year round and therefore mostly very clear. In Lake Uri, at Sisikon, one can dive to a fragmented steep vertical wall, at the northern portal of the Schieferneggtunnel. The Lediwrack Bruno lies in front of Brunnen at a depth of 15 meters. Other well-known diving spots are in front of Vitznau, Weggis, Gersau and Hergiswil.

=== Tourism ===
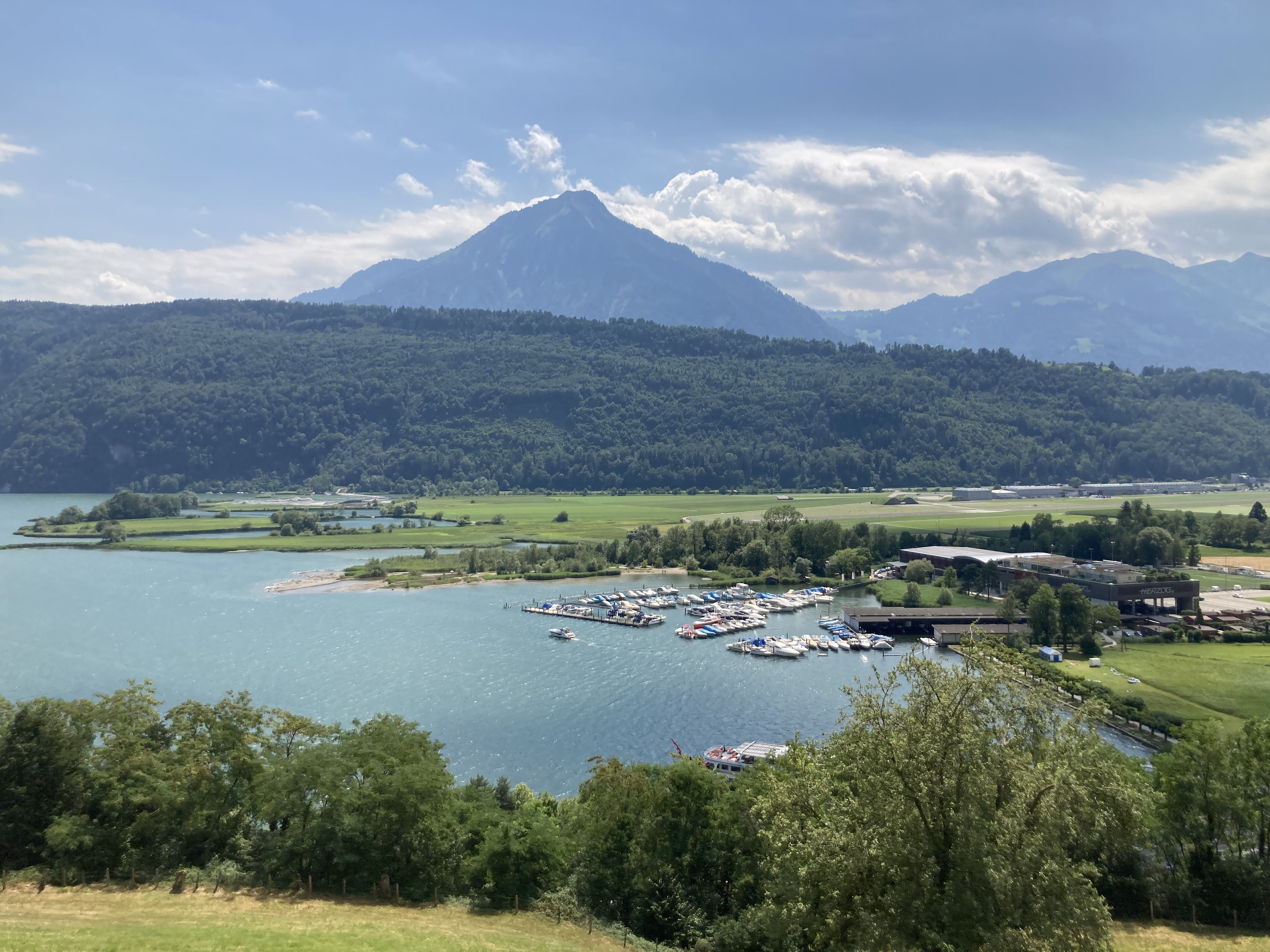
Stanserhorn behind Lake Lucerne

On the way south, the English discovered the mountains of central Switzerland. Several spa and bathing resorts such as Weggis or Gersau were created. In 1871, the very first rack railway in Europe, the Vitznau-Rigi Railway, was opened. In 1889 the steepest cog railway in the world was built from Alpnachstad to Mount Pilatus. Mark Twain described an ascent to the Rigi, which led to the blossoming of Swiss tourism in the United States in the 19th century. One of the largest steamship fleets in Europe operates with five steamships on Lake Lucerne.

In the area surrounding the lake and on terraces at medium height (for example Morschach and Seelisberg) there are numerous places for tourists. The Rigi, Pilatus, the Bürgenstock, the Stanserhorn, the Buochserhorn, and the two legends, the Urirotstock and the Fronalpstock are attractive panoramic mountains near Lake Lucerne. Most of them can be reached by mountain railways, some of which have their valley station near boat stations on the lake.

There are numerous locations on the lake that are important in Swiss cultural and tourism history: Rütli, Tellsplatte, Tell Chapel, Carving Tower of Stansstad, Neu-Habsburg, Schillerstein, Treib, Astrid Chapel (Küssnacht) and Meggenhorn Castle.

== In popular culture ==
Beethoven's Moonlight Sonata derives its name from an 1832 description of the first movement by poet and music critic Ludwig Rellstab, who compared it to moonlight shining upon Lake Lucerne.

Gioacchino Rossini uses this in his William Tell Overture Section A: Sunrise over the Alps.
