= Sisikon =

- Municipality
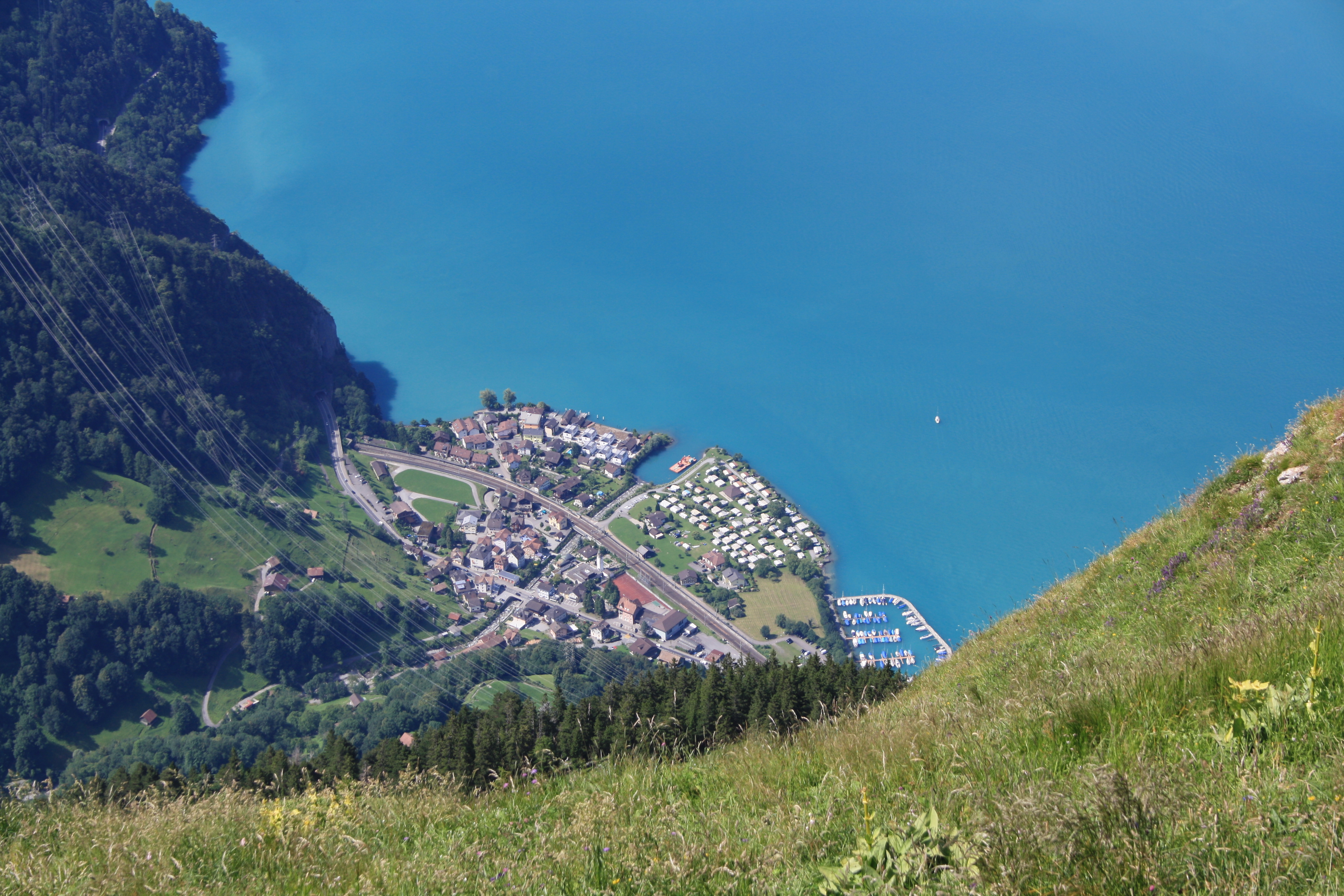

- Coat of arms
- Location of Sisikon
- Location within Switzerland Location within Canton of Uri
- Coordinates: 46°57′N 8°37′E
- Country: Switzerland
- Canton: Uri
- District: n.a.

Area
  - Total: 16.30 km^{2} (6.29 sq mi)
- Elevation: 453 m (1,486 ft)

Population (December 2020)
  - Total: 383
  - Density: 23.5/km^{2} (60.9/sq mi)
- Time zone: UTC+01:00 (CET)
  - Summer (DST): UTC+02:00 (CEST)
- Postal code: 6452
- SFOS number: 1217
- ISO 3166 code: CH-UR
- Surrounded by: Bauen, Bürglen, Flüelen, Morschach (SZ), Riemenstalden (SZ), Seelisberg
- Website: www.sisikon.ch

Sisikon is a municipality in the canton of Uri in Switzerland. It is situated on the shore of Lake Lucerne.

== Geography ==
Aerial view from 100 m by Walter Mittelholzer (1922)

Sisikon has an area, as of 2006, of 16.3 km^{2} (6.3 sq mi). Of this area, 30.9% is used for agricultural purposes, while 44% is forested. Of the rest of the land, 1.2% is settled (buildings or roads) and the remainder (23.8%) is non-productive (rivers, glaciers or mountains). In the 1993/97 land survey, 36.5% of the total land area was heavily forested, while 4.1% is covered in small trees and shrubbery. Of the agricultural land, 0.2% is used for farming or pastures, while 4.5% is used for orchards or vine crops and 26.3% is used for alpine pastures. Of the settled areas, 0.4% is covered with buildings, 0.2% is listed as parks and greenbelts and 0.6% is transportation infrastructure. Of the unproductive areas, 0.4% is unproductive standing water (ponds or lakes), 0.2% is unproductive flowing water (rivers), 7.7% is too rocky for vegetation, and 15.5% is other unproductive land.

Spilauersee is located on an alp below Rossstock.

== Demographics ==
Sisikon has a population (as of 31 December 2020) of 383. As of 2007, 6.8% of the population was made up of foreign nationals. Over the last 10 years the population has decreased at a rate of -2.8%. Most of the population (as of 2000) speaks German (96.0%), with Italian being second most common (1.4%) and Serbo-Croatian being third (1.1%). As of 2007 the gender distribution of the population was 51.8% male and 48.2% female.

In the 2007 federal election the FDP party received 75% of the vote.

In Sisikon about 69.7% of the population (between age 25-64) have completed either non-mandatory upper secondary education or additional higher education (either university or a Fachhochschule).

Sisikon has an unemployment rate of 0.36%. As of 2005, there were 24 people employed in the primary economic sector and about 12 businesses involved in this sector. 11 people are employed in the secondary sector and there are 4 businesses in this sector. 90 people are employed in the tertiary sector, with 16 businesses in this sector.

The historical population is given in the following table:

year	population
1970	309
1980	314
1990	319
2000	350
2005	390
2007	382

== Transport ==
Sisikon is served by the Sisikon station, situated within the municipality and on the Gotthard railway. Sisikon can be accessed by road via the Axenstrasse.
