= Rophaien =

Mountain in Switzerland

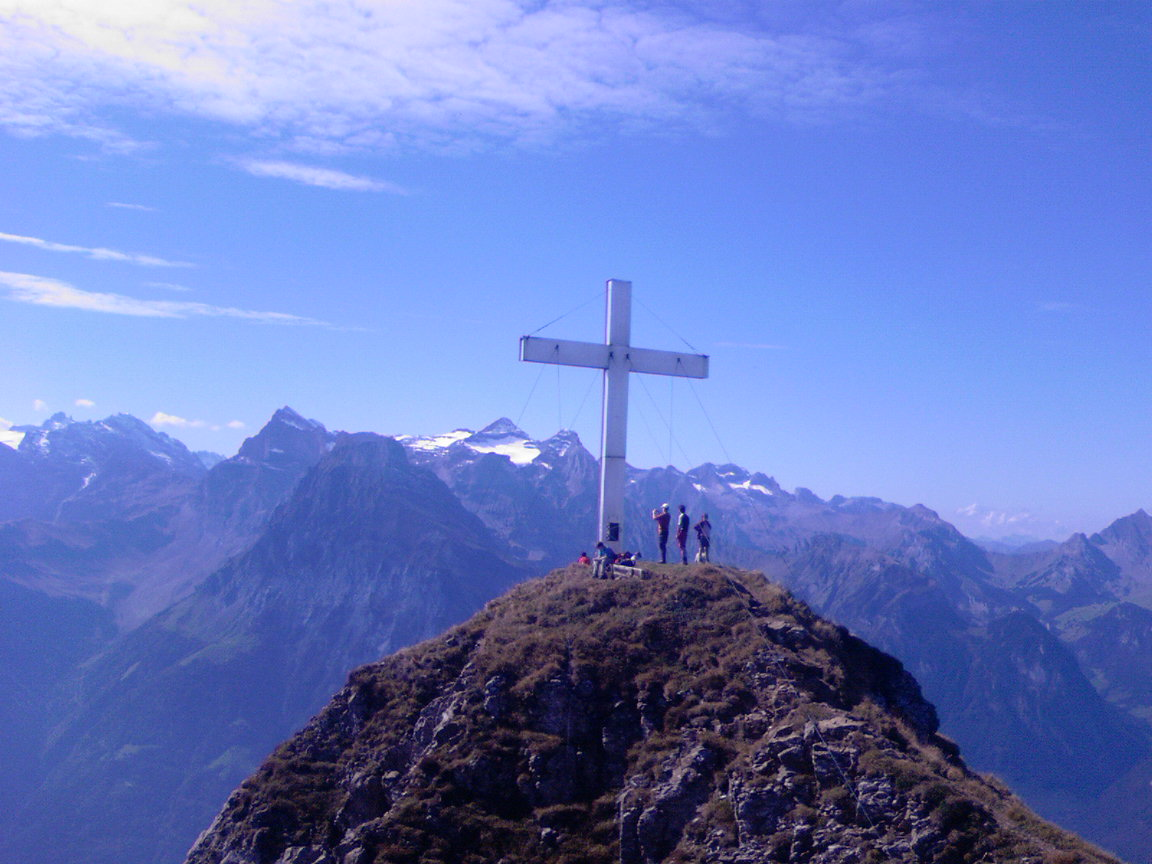
- The summit

Highest point
- Elevation: 2,077 m (6,814 ft)
- Prominence: 122 m (400 ft)
- Coordinates: 46°55′41″N 8°38′47″E

Geography
- Location within Switzerland
- Location: Uri, Switzerland
- Parent range: Schwyzer Alps
- Topo map: Swiss Federal Office of Topography swisstopo

The Rophaien (2,077 m) is a mountain of the Schwyzer Alps, overlooking Lake Lucerne (Urnersee) in the canton of Uri. It lies west of the Rossstock, at the western end of the range north of the Schächental.
