= Wyrsch =

Wyrsch is a German language surname. Notable people with the name include:

- Alois Wyrsch (1825–1888), Swiss politician
- Charles Wyrsch (1920–2019), Swiss artist and painter
- Louis Wyrsch (1793–1858), Swiss politician and a military commander
- Melchior Wyrsch (1732–1798), Swiss painter
