= Coats of arms and flags of the municipalities in the canton of Nidwalden =

The first three of the eleven municipal coats of arms and flags of the Canton of Nidwalden, Switzerland, were created by the heraldist and archivist Adalbert Vokinger (1859–1896): Beckenried (1883), Buochs (1893), and Ennetbürgen (1894). Buochs required a coat of arms and a flag for a shooting festival medal, while Ennetbürgen needed two for a stained glass pane in the new church.

In 1901, the cantonal capital Stans adopted the coat of arms and flag belonging to a former manorial farm (Dinghof) listed in a provost's register of 1499, so as to represent itself alongside the larger Swiss municipalities in the National Council Hall in the Swiss capital of Bern.

The remaining municipal coats of arms and flags of Nidwalden were created in 1905 as decorative elements for the paneling in the new council chamber of the Nidwalden government in Stans. Responsibility for designing these arms and flags was entrusted to the historian and state archivist Robert Durrer (1867–1934).

== List of coats of arms and flags ==
Coats of Arms	Flag	Blazon, Symbolism and Municipal Colours
Beckenried
		Gules, a fess wavy Argent, in chief a castle triple-towered Argent with a crenellated main roof, an open gate, and the flank towers roofed Or, in base a scallop shell Argent. In 1883, Adalbert Vokinger (a heraldist from Stans) designed the municipal coat of arms and flag. The postmaster at the time, Jakob Amstad, paid for the design. Not least because of this, the shell from his family coat of arms and flag now adorns the municipal coat of arms and flag. The castle is intended to be reminiscent of the two castle sites in Beckenried, Isenringen and Retschrieden. More recently, the shell has been associated with the pilgrimage route leading from Germany/Lake Constance via Einsiedeln-Beckenried-Sachseln-Brünig-Bernese Oberland-Lake Geneva-France to Santiago de Compostela in northwestern Spain. The veneration there is for the apostle James the Elder, who is usually depicted with a shell. Such a Jacob's shell also contains the gravestone of Ensign Jakob Stalder, Knight of the Holy Sepulchre of Jerusalem, placed near the church portal as a confession of his pilgrimage to Santiago de Compostela in 1591. Another indication of the possible derivation of the shell from the pilgrimage route is that a number of municipalities on the various pilgrimage routes have the shell in their coat of arms and flag. Municipal colours: Red-white
Buochs
		Party per fess nebuly Argent and Azure. When the cantonal shooting festival was held in Buochs in 1895 and a medal was to be designed for it, the designer Adelbert Vokinger suggested including the municipal coat of arms and flag. The suggestion was well received, but there was a catch: Buochs didn't yet have its own coat of arms and flag. The then state archivist, Robert Durrer, found a solution by drawing attention to the seal and flag of Johannes von Buochs, which the ministerial had affixed to a document on 26 April 1260. The proposal was well received, and the municipal council subsequently declared the 13th-century seal the official municipal coat of arms and flag. At the same time, they also specified the colors, as these were missing from the seal imprint. Municipal colours: Blue-white
Dallenwil
		Or, Saint Lawrence nimbed Argent inscribed "Sanctus Laurentius M." Sable, vested in a dalmatic Gules over an alb Argent, holding in his dexter hand a palm Vert and in his sinister hand a gridiron Sable. Dallenwil has one of the oldest municipal coats of arms and flag, which had been completely forgotten until 1899, when H. Angst published a foreign manuscript from the "Society of Dalwil 1522" in the Anzeiger für schweizische Altertumskunde (Advertisement for Swiss Antiquities), depicting Saint Lawrence with a rosette and palm branch as its coat of arms. The discoverer attributed the manuscript to Talwil in Zurich, but the connection to Dallenwil, Dalwil in Nidwalden, is undeniable, since St. Lawrence was and remained the patron saint of the chapel there as early as 1473, and the style of the manuscript also points to Lucerne or ancient Switzerland. The revival of the old coat of arms and flag initially met with some resistance. When it was proposed for a rifle club flag in 1900, the local chaplain protested, arguing that placing a saint on a secular flag was considered profanation. In 1905, however, the coat of arms and flag was included in the series of the council chamber and has been considered official ever since. Municipal colours: Yellow-white
Emmetten
		Gules, three scallop shells Argent (2,1). Adopted in 1905, the shells allude to Saint James the Elder, the main patron saint of the old parish church. Municipal colours: Red-white
Ennetbürgen
		Gules, a crutched cross raguly Argent with two bells Or hanging therefrom, in chief a sun Or with a human face, the sinister eye closed, emitting eight straight and eight wavy rays. Adopted in 1894, the municipal coat of arms and flag depicts a white, gnarled St. Anthony's Cross on a red field, hung with two golden bells, and above it a golden sun. These symbols refer to the church's patron saint, St. Anthony, and the municipality's sunny location. Municipal colours: Red-white
Ennetmoos
		Sable, a dragon rampant Or, armed and breathing flames Gules, pierced by a broken spearhead Or dripping blood. Adopted in 1905, the municipal coat of arms and flag of Ennetmoos commemorates the dragon which, according to legend, lived in the Ennetmoos Dragon's Hole and was killed by Struthan von Winkelried. Municipal colours: Yellow-black
Hergiswil
		Azure, a chamois statant Argent on a triple mount Or, in dexter chief a Gothic capital letter H Or. Hergiswil received its coat of arms and flag in 1905. At that time, the Nidwalden cantonal council wanted to have all the municipalities' national emblems and flags affixed to the paneling of the cantonal council chamber. However, after some municipalities submitted the most grotesque designs, Robert Durrer was appointed cantonal herald and given the authority to design the final municipal coats of arms and flag. Hergiswil had proposed a chamois as the figure. It was presumably meant to refer to the nearby Mount Pilatus. Durrer adopted this suggestion but added the municipality's initial letter to the coat of arms and flag. Municipal colours: Blue-white
Oberdorf
		Per pale, Azure, a tower embattled Argent with a window Sable on a triple mount Vert, and Argent, a squirrel sejant Gules holding a nut of the same on a triple mount Vert, all surmounted by a pile inverted embowed per pale Or and Sable charged with a mount of six coupeaux Vert. Adopted in 1905, the coat of arms and flag reflects the municipality's composition, comprising the three parts of Waltersberg, Büren, and Oberdorf. The white tower, the green six-mountain, and the red squirrel are coats of arms of knights from the 14th and 15th centuries in these three districts: The tower comes from the coat of arms and flag of the Knights of Büren, the six-mountain in the upper center from the Knights of Waltersberg, and the squirrel from the Knights of Aa, whose castle site was presumed to be in the Oberdorf area west of the Aa River. Municipal colours: Blue-white
Stans
		Gules, an ibex rampant party per fess Sable and Or. Adopted in 1905. Municipal colours: Black-yellow-red
Stansstad
		Gules, on a base wavy Azure a tower embattled Argent with two windows, surrounded by twelve pallets Or. Adopted in 1905. Municipal colours: Red-white
Wolfenschiessen
		Azure, a wolf rampant Argent, langued Gules, pierced by an arrow Or. Adopted in 1905, the coats of arms and flag are cantings as the name of the municipality means "shoot the wolf". Municipal colours: White-blue
