= 1863 Swiss federal election =

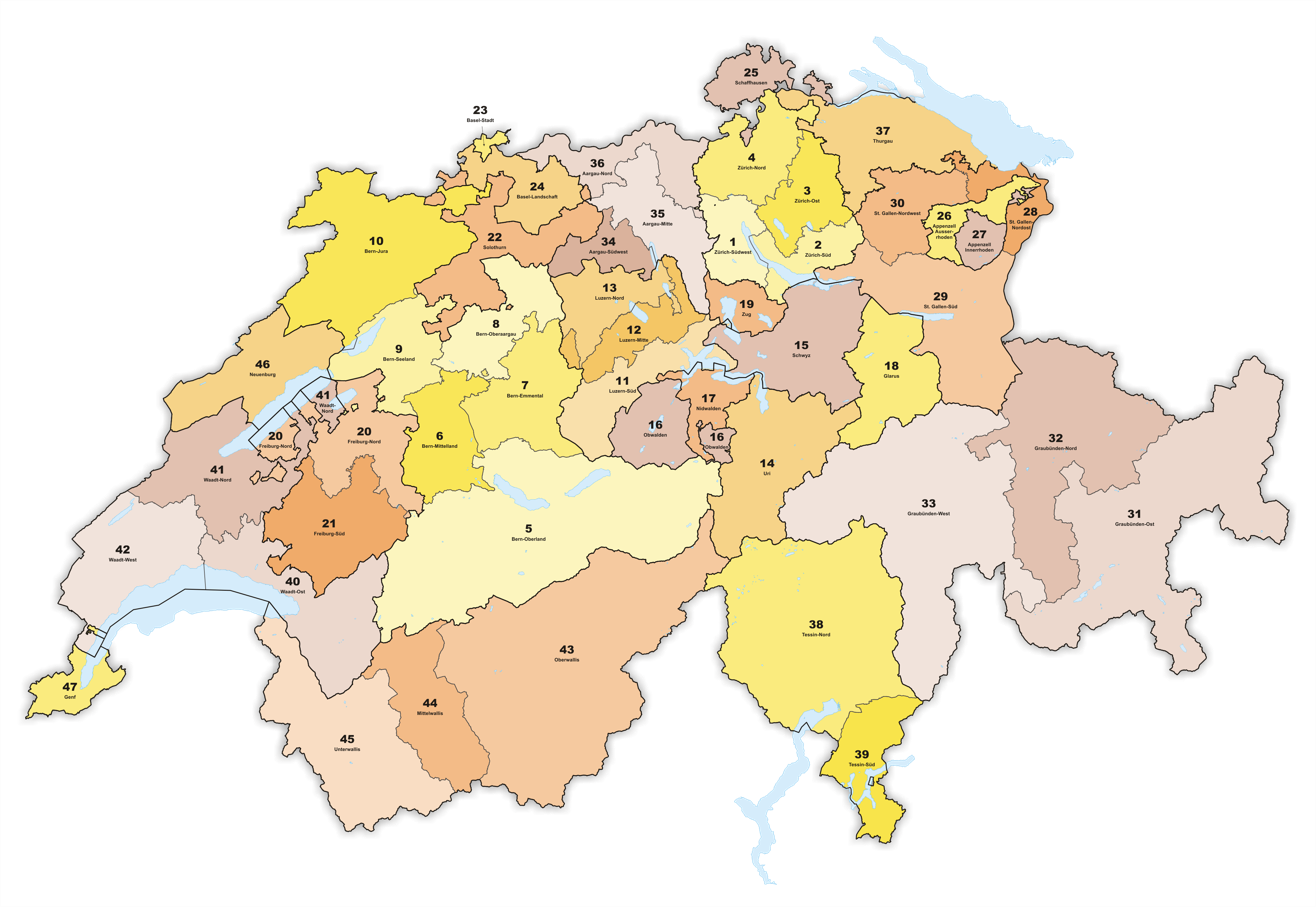
The 47 electoral districts

Federal elections were held in Switzerland on 25 October 1863. The Radical Left remained the largest group in the National Council, but lost its majority for the first time since 1848.

== Electoral system ==
The 128 members of the National Council were elected in 47 single- and multi-member constituencies; there was one seat for every 20,000 citizens, with seats allocated to cantons in proportion to their population. As a result of the 1860 census, the number of seats was increased by eight following the previous elections in 1860, although the number of constituencies was reduced from 49; the extra seats were given to Basel-Landschaft, Basel-Stadt, Geneva, Graubünden, St. Gallen, Thurgau, Vaud and Valais. The elections were held using a three-round system; candidates had to receive a majority in the first or second round to be elected; if it went to a third round, only a plurality was required. Voters could cast as many votes as there were seats in their constituency. In six cantons (Appenzell Innerrhoden, Appenzell Ausserrhoden, Glarus, Nidwalden, Obwalden and Uri), National Council members were elected by the Landsgemeinde.

== Results ==
=== National Council ===
Voter turnout was highest in the Canton of Schaffhausen (where voting was compulsory) at 88.2% and lowest in the Canton of Zürich at 18.6%.

Party	Votes	%	Seats	+/–
Radical Left		44.1	59	–5
Liberal Centre		23.8	37	0
Catholic Right		19.0	21	+6
Democratic Left		6.7	6	+5
Evangelical Right		4.6	5	+2
Independents		1.8	0	0
Total			128	+8
Total votes	259,398	–		
Registered voters/turnout	556,738	46.59		
Source: BFS

==== By constituency ====
Constituency	Seats	Party	Seats won	Elected members
Zürich 1	4	Liberal Centre	3	Alfred Escher; Jakob Dubs; Georg Joseph Sidler
Zürich 1	4	Evangelical Right	1	Paul Carl Eduard Ziegler
Zürich 2	3	Liberal Centre	3	Heinrich Honegger; Johann Jakob Widmer; Johann Heinrich Fierz
Zürich 3	3	Liberal Centre	3	Eduard Suter; Heinrich Grunholzer; Rudolf Wäffler
Zürich 4	3	Liberal Centre	3	Rudolf Benz; Ulrich Meister Sr.; Johann Jakob Bucher
Bern 5	4	Radical Left	4	Jakob Scherz; Friedrich Seiler; Karl Engemann; Johann Jakob Karlen
Bern 6	4	Evangelical Right	2	Christoph Albert Kurz; Eduard Blösch
Bern 6	4	Radical Left	2	Jakob Stämpfli; Karl W. von Graffenried
Bern 7	4	Radical Left	4	Karl Karrer; Samuel Lehmann; Johann Ulrich Gfeller; Ludwig Wyss
Bern 8	4	Radical Left	4	Jakob Steiner; Johann Rudolf Vogel; Johann Bützberger; Johann Weber
Bern 9	3	Radical Left	2	Niklaus Niggeler; Johann Rudolf Schneider
Bern 9	3	Evangelical Right	1	Peter von Känel
Bern 10	4	Radical Left	4	Paul Migy; Édouard Carlin; Cyprien Revel; Xavier Stockmar
Lucerne 11	2	Liberal Centre	1	Josef Martin Knüsel
Lucerne 11	2	Radical Left	1	Wilhelm Schindler
Lucerne 12	2	Catholic Right	2	Philipp Anton von Segesser; Vinzenz Fischer
Lucerne 13	3	Radical Left	3	Anton Hunkeler; Hans Theiler; Anton Wapf
Uri 14	1	Catholic Right	1	Alexander Muheim
Schwyz 15	2	Catholic Right	2	Karl Styger; Karl Benziger
Obwalden 16	1	Catholic Right	1	Franz Wirz
Nidwalden 17	1	Liberal Centre	1	Alois Wyrsch
Glarus 18	2	Liberal Centre	2	Joachim Heer; Peter Jenny
Zug 19	1	Liberal Centre	1	Wolfgang Henggeler
Fribourg 20	3	Catholic Right	3	Alfred Vonderweid; Samuel Presset; Laurent Chaney
Fribourg 21	2	Catholic Right	2	Louis de Wuilleret; Pierre-Théodule Fracheboud
Solothurn 22	3	Radical Left	2	Simon Kaiser; Benedikt von Arx
Solothurn 22	3	Catholic Right	1	Franz Bünzli
Basel-Stadt 23	2	Liberal Centre	1	Johann Jakob Stehlin
Basel-Stadt 23	2	Radical Left	1	Wilhelm Klein
Basel-Landschaft 24	3	Radical Left	3	Jakob Graf; Jakob Joseph Adam; Stephan Gutzwiller
Schaffhausen 25	2	Liberal Centre	1	Friedrich Peyer im Hof
Schaffhausen 25	2	Democratic Left	1	Wilhelm Joos
Appenzell Ausserrhoden 26	2	Liberal Centre	2	Johannes Roth; Adolf Friedrich Zürcher
Appenzell Innerhoden 27	1	Catholic Right	1	Johann Baptist Dähler
St. Gallen 28	3	Liberal Centre	3	Johann Baptist Weder; Joseph Marzell Hoffmann; Wilhelm Matthias Naeff
St. Gallen 29	3	Liberal Centre	2	Josef Leonhard Bernold; Paravizin Hilty
St. Gallen 29	3	Democratic Left	1	Basil Ferdinand Curti
St. Gallen 30	3	Radical Left	1	Carl Georg Jakob Sailer; Johann M. Hungerbühler
St. Gallen 30	3	Democratic Left	1	Georg Friedrich Anderegg
Grisons 31	2	Radical Left	1	Johann Gaudenz von Salis
Grisons 31	2	Liberal Centre	1	Simeon Bavier
Grisons 32	2	Radical Left	1	Alois de Latour
Grisons 32	2	Catholic Right	1	Johann R. von Toggenburg
Grisons 33	1	Liberal Centre	1	Andreas Rudolf von Planta
Aargau 34	3	Liberal Centre	3	Friedrich Frey-Herosé; Adolf Fischer; Carl Feer-Herzog
Aargau 35	4	Liberal Centre	2	Johann Rudolf Ringier; Gottlieb Jäger
Aargau 35	4	Radical Left	2	Johann Peter Bruggisser; Augustin Keller
Aargau 36	3	Catholic Right	2	Wilhelm Karl Baldinger; Peter Acklin
Aargau 36	3	Radical Left	1	Franz Waller
Thurgau 37	5	Liberal Centre	2	Johann Messmer; Johann Joachim Lüthi
Thurgau 37	5	Catholic Right	1	Augustin Ramsperger
Thurgau 37	5	Radical Left	1	Johann Ludwig Sulzberger
Thurgau 37	5	Democratic Left	1	Fridolin Anderwert
Ticino 38	3	Radical Left	3	Antonio Bossi; Costantino Bernasconi; Carlo Battaglini
Ticino 39	3	Radical Left	2	Giovanni Battista Pioda; Giovanni Jauch
Ticino 39	3	Catholic Right	1	Michele Pedrazzini
Vaud 40	4	Radical Left	2	Constant Fornerod; François Corboz
Vaud 40	4	Liberal Centre	1	Édouard Dapples
Vaud 40	4	Democratic Left	1	Jules Eytel
Vaud 41	4	Liberal Centre	2	Jean-Louis Demiéville; Charles Bontems
Vaud 41	4	Radical Left	2	Victor Ruffy; Abram-Daniel Meystre
Vaud 42	3	Radical Left	2	Louis-Henri Delarageaz; Jean-Louis Ancrenaz
Vaud 42	3	Democratic Left	1	John Berney
Valais 43	2	Catholic Right	2	Alexis Allet; Adrien de Courten
Valais 44	1	Catholic Right	1	Charles de Rivaz
Valais 45	2	Radical Left	2	Maurice-Antoine Cretton; Louis Barman
Neuchâtel 46	4	Radical Left	4	Alexis-Marie Piaget; Jules Philippin; Ami Girard; Louis Grandpierre
Geneva 47	4	Radical Left	4	Alexis-Marie Piaget; Jules Philippin; Ami Girard; Louis Grandpierre
Source: Gruner

=== Council of States ===
Party	Seats	+/–
Catholic Right	17	+4
Liberal Centre	13	0
Radical Left	9	–4
Evangelical Right	1	0
Democratic Left	0	0
Independents	4	0
Total	44	0
Source: Federal Assembly
