= Colonialism in Switzerland =

Historical involvement of Switzerland and Swiss citizens in European colonial enterprises

- Date: 17th century – 20th century
- Location: Global (various European colonies)
- Participants: Swiss mercenaries, merchants, missionaries, investors
- Outcome: Swiss participation in colonial trade, slavery, and territorial expansion

Colonialism in Switzerland refers to the historical involvement of Switzerland and Swiss citizens in European colonialism, despite Switzerland never possessing formal colonies of its own. While Switzerland maintained official neutrality and did not establish overseas territories, Swiss individuals, companies, and investors participated extensively in colonial enterprises, including the Atlantic slave trade, plantation slavery, and colonial commerce from the 17th to the 20th centuries.

The concept of colonialism in the Swiss context challenges the traditional narrative of Swiss neutrality and exceptionalism, revealing how Swiss citizens and capital were integrated into global colonial networks despite the country's official non-participation in imperial ventures.

== Definition and characteristics ==
In its broadest sense, colonialism can be defined as the domination of one people by foreigners from another culture. European colonialism, however, possessed three distinctive characteristics that distinguished it from earlier forms of territorial expansion. First, it involved the domination of distant dependencies based on the interests, usually economic, of metropolitan centers. Second, colonizers and colonized remained foreign to each other, unlike earlier empires where conquest typically led to cultural fusion. This separation was justified in the 19th century through racial hierarchy theories, supposedly inevitable and insurmountable. Third, European colonialism was elevated, from the 16th century onward, into an ideology glorifying the accomplishment of a civilizing mission, claiming European technical and cultural superiority gave both the right and duty to "civilize" supposedly inferior peoples.

Between the early 15th century and the late 1930s, colonial Europe extended its domination over nearly half of the inhabited world. The extreme slowness of contemporary colonial empire formation—conquests, territorial occupation, and population control typically took more than two centuries in Asia and Africa—contrasted sharply with their rapid collapse after World War II. In less than twenty years, nearly a hundred colonies in Asia and Africa gained independence through decolonization, giving birth to what was then called the Third World.

== Swiss participation in colonial enterprises ==
=== Military involvement ===
Swiss participation in European colonial expansion took various forms, beginning in the early 17th century with Swiss mercenaries participating in colonial conquests and colonial order maintenance operations. In the New World, Swiss military personnel engaged in the conquest of North America. In certain Dutch plantation colonies, they conducted campaigns against revolting slaves. A Swiss battalion participated in a French expedition from 1801–1803 to suppress Toussaint Louverture's insurrection in Saint-Domingue (Haiti), hoping to recapture the colony and restore slavery.

In Asia, the Dutch East India Company, which established numerous trading posts and strongholds in Ceylon (Sri Lanka), the East Indies (Indian archipelago), the Malay Peninsula (Malaysia), and the coasts of the Indian subcontinent (India), recruited Swiss soldiers. The company went so far as to enroll an entire Swiss regiment, that of the Neuchâtel brothers Charles-Daniel and Pierre-Frédéric de Meuron. Swiss mercenaries also entered the service of the British East India Company and fought against the French for control of portions of the subcontinent.

In Africa, Swiss soldiers first appeared in South Africa, then in Morocco and Egypt, as well as in Algeria during the French conquest. During the 1880s, about twenty Swiss officers served in the army of Leopold II, King of the Belgians, self-proclaimed absolute sovereign of the Congo. Among them was Erwin Federspiel, who upon returning to Switzerland defended in a pamphlet (Wie es im Congostaat zugeht. Skizzen, 1909) the brutal and predatory exploitation system established by the Belgian monarch.

=== Commercial and financial involvement ===
Swiss business circles participated in the Atlantic slave trade and colonial commerce despite the rarity and dispersion of sources documenting these activities. During much of the 18th and first third of the 19th centuries, Swiss individuals, mostly gravitating in Huguenot business circles (Protestant refugees), participated in the Atlantic slave trade. They comprised three groups: Swiss manufacturers and merchants supplying trade goods, chiefly printed cotton fabrics (indiennes) traded for Black captives on the West African coast; Swiss-born cotton printers who relocated to ports such as Nantes, France's principal slave port, to produce those goods locally; and Swiss financiers who backed slaving voyages among other ventures.

The most important companies were based in Basel (Christoph Burckhardt & Cie; Emmanuel and Nicolas Weis and sons; Riedy & Thurninger; Kuster & Pelloutier; Simon & Roques), Neuchâtel (Favre-Petitpierre & Cie; Pourtalès et Cie; Gorgerat Frères & Cie), and Geneva (Labat Frères, Rivier & Cie, Jean-Louis Baux & Cie). Some covered all activities conducted within triangular trade: production and sale of trade goods with cotton prints, participation in slave trafficking, and commercialization of colonial products (sugar, coffee, cocoa). Others traded raw materials essential for cotton print manufacturing: exotic American dyes (indigo, cochineal, dyewood), gum arabic from Senegal, and white cotton fabrics from India that constituted the base product for printing.

=== Banking and investment ===
Financial involvement in the Atlantic slave trade occurred in a less dispersed manner. Established in Lisbon, the Neuchâtel native David de Pury was a shareholder in a Portuguese chartered company holding a state concession granting commercial monopoly, one of whose activities was the slave trade, deporting captives from Angolan coasts to Brazilian plantations. Similarly, banks invested money in the slave trade. The establishments Marcuard & Cie and Zeerleder & Cie of Bern appear on the shareholder list of the French East India Company, which launched more than 130 expeditions from the Atlantic coast. Tourton & Baur and Mallet frères & Cie, two major Parisian banks with Genevan connections, possessed numerous clients in Rouen, Le Havre, Bordeaux, and Nantes, among whom were prominently French businessmen heavily engaged in slave trade and colonial commerce.

The cities of Bern and Zurich acquired shares in the South Sea Company, based in London, which organized slave sales to Spanish American colonies. Swiss private and institutional investors bought bonds issued by the Danish government, serving partly to relaunch the plantation slave economy on Saint Thomas island in the Danish West Indies.

=== Plantation ownership and colonial settlements ===
Swiss insertion into the Atlantic slave trade often went hand in hand with involvement in colonial circuits. Their presence in the American plantation slave system illustrates this concomitance. In the 18th and 19th centuries, residents of Geneva, Basel, St. Gallen, Vaud, and Zurich owned plantations in Spanish, English, French, and Dutch colonies, as well as in Brazil. They were sometimes the operators (Friedrich Ludwig Escher in Cuba, for example), having slaves cultivate sugar, coffee, cocoa, cotton, or rice. More often they remained in Europe and delegated administration of their affairs to managers established on site. For them, plantations constituted important capital investments.

In Asia and colonial Africa, three emblematic cases of contemporary implantation deserve mention. The first involved the import-export company Volkart Brothers (Gebrüder Volkart), founded in Winterthur and Bombay, which became one of the largest exporters of Indian cotton. It succeeded in an extremely competitive branch and region by patiently building trust relationships with local business networks. The second occurred in French Algeria, where the Geneva Company of Swiss Colonies of Sétif, founded by capitalists from Calvin's city, represented one of the rare Swiss experiences in settlement and agricultural colonization. The third was located in British Gold Coast (Ghana). There, Basel capital supported the development of a Swiss commercial giant in sub-Saharan Africa—the Missions-Handlungs-Gesellschaft (MHG, Basel Trading Company)—atypically connected to the Basel Mission. This last case had another singularity: the MHG chose to specialize in cacao production and trade, making Ghana the world's largest supplier.

=== Scale and significance ===
Measuring Swiss involvement in European expansionism reveals relatively limited engagement compared to major colonial powers. Switzerland's participation in Europe's overseas expansion was slight compared to Great Britain, a major colonial power whose long-lived empire spanned all continents, took every form, and generated intense circulation of people, goods, and capital. At the 18th-century height of the transatlantic slave trade, Britain carried 40% of the six million Africans shipped to the Americas, while Switzerland handled just over 2%.

Swiss relations with overseas territories were largely indirect and occasional. For the Atlantic slave trade example, Swiss participants were ultimately circumstantial slave traders, and this type of business represented only a reduced or marginal fraction of their economic activities. Their participation in the Atlantic slave trade was late and brief: it began two and a half centuries after the first expedition to the Americas and lasted only half a century. The second half of the 18th century, when Swiss actively engaged in the trade, was marked by intensification of the "shameful traffic," synonymous with immobilization of important capital and strong competition, and by increased risks inherent to the trade.

== Cultural impact of colonialism in Switzerland ==
=== Civilizing discourse and racial theories ===
The diffusion of the concept of "civilization," a true system of thought in the 19th century, constitutes one of the most visible traces of colonialism in Europe. In Switzerland, civilizing rhetoric hardly differed from that of European colonial empires. Considering Christianity as the sole source of salvation, free trade as a vector of material progress, and Western knowledge as objective truth, this concept justified colonial expansionism by rationalizing its characteristic violence and presenting it as a philanthropic act. This discourse, which conveyed contemporary racial theories, allowed overcoming fundamental contradictions, notably those opposing science and religion in Europe.

Until the first half of the 20th century, numerous Swiss journals and learned societies legitimized the colonial enterprise by emphasizing the concept of "civilization." In geographic studies, missionaries and explorers such as Paul Berthoud, Alfred Bertrand, Fritz Ramseyer, and Henri-Alexandre Junod defended colonialism's civilizing work, especially in Africa. Naturalists such as Paul and Fritz Sarasin (Southern Asia) and anthropologists like Rudolf Martin (Malaysia) and Eugène Pittard (Balkans) contributed to elaborating the racial "sciences" underlying civilizing discourse. The same applied to university research, as evidenced by the careers and works of Louis Agassiz, Auguste Forel, and Carl Vogt. In physician George Montandon, a sympathizer of the Nazi German regime, one observes the excesses of European racism qualified as scientific (eugenics, antisemitism).

=== Popular culture and exhibitions ===
This supposedly scientific production benefited from multiple diffusion channels in the 19th and 20th centuries: publishing (publishing houses), education (public instruction, religious education), everyday objects, public events, posters, radio, and cinema. While support variety was great, the conveyed message summarized to the devaluation of colonized peoples. The organization of "human zoos," for example, was very popular in Switzerland. In this type of tourist exhibition, indigenous people from other continents, enclosed in parks or zoological and botanical gardens, staged daily life modeled on contemporary racial stereotypes. Between 1855 and 1940, Zurich and Basel stood out in Europe (with Paris and Hamburg) for the quantity of such events, also including other spectacles and exhibitions. In this context, one can cite the "black village," arranged parallel to the "Swiss village" for the 1896 National Exhibition in Geneva.

This direct confrontation with otherness allowed national identities to assert themselves (as with any other form of identity) in a Europe marked by nation building. In Switzerland, colonialism contributed to forging the image of a country integrated into the concert of European nations, having the right—according to words pronounced by Alexandre Gavard in Geneva in 1898—to exploit colonies and the duty to "civilize" distant peoples. This self-representation coexisted with a "rhetoric of smallness," stipulating that the Swiss, perceived as free and neutral mountaineers (shepherd people), would have overcome through their genius the geographical narrowness of their country and demographic limitations.

=== Gender and colonial ideology ===
Postcolonial studies highlight the link between gender-related prejudices, which relegated women to subordinate roles, and colonialism legitimations. This ideology, based on hierarchization of social classes and "races," stipulated that "white men" situated themselves at the top of the social pyramid. These actors are particularly well documented in colonialism history, while references to enslaved persons, particularly women, are only occasional. Recent historical research has illuminated certain women's paths, such as Pauline Buisson, born a slave in Saint-Domingue (Haiti) and transferred to Switzerland. Louis Wyrsch, for his part, had as concubine Silla (Johanna van den Berg), originally from Borneo. The latter was the mother of Alois Wyrsch, Switzerland's first colored National Councillor. Research also emphasizes Swiss women's involvement in colonial networks. Clémence Royer notably supported social Darwinism theses and defended colonization. Bertha Hardegger, a physician, went to Lesotho, where she faced less discrimination in practicing her profession than in Switzerland. Swiss nationals also exercised great influence as missionaries, when they propagated the idea of European superiority.

=== Artistic and cultural influence ===
Colonial expansion also impacted Switzerland's artistic and cultural scene. Dada, for example, a pacifist and nonconformist movement appearing in 1915 in Zurich, was notably inspired by traditional African art and propagated an idealized vision of indigenous cultures from Africa, North America, and overseas. The works of visual artist Sophie Taeuber-Arp, the paintings of Paul Klee, and the sculptures of Alberto Giacometti, often tinged with exoticism, draw on the formal language of extra-European art in their abstraction. Colonial heritage also surfaces in literature, even among racism-critical authors such as Max Frisch, whose concept of male "whiteness" references Critical Whiteness Studies. It is also inscribed in everyday language, conveyed by expressions such as "aller chez le toubib" (going to the doctor) or "vivre comme un nabab" (living in opulence).

=== Architectural legacy ===
Fortunes based on the Atlantic slave trade or colonial commerce often participated in enriching Switzerland's urban and rural landscape. Thus, Jacques-Louis de Pourtalès and Auguste-Frédéric de Meuron erected two health houses in Neuchâtel: Hôpital Pourtalès in 1808 (which still bears its founder's name) and the Hospice de Préfargier in 1849. David de Pury contributed to modernizing the city by bequeathing all his goods to it. Other more peripheral regions experienced similar development. Brothers Giuseppe and Pio Soldati, for example, returned to Ticino after making their fortune in Buenos Aires. Members of the Ticino economic elite, they built monumental villas, founded schools and childcare centers, supported parishes, and constructed roads. In Appenzell Ausserrhoden, architecture also testifies to certain merchants' prosperity, enriched through colonial trade. Jakob Zellweger, a textile entrepreneur involved in triangular trade, had a sumptuous residence built in Trogen in the second half of the 18th century.

== Modern reassessment and decolonization ==
=== Historical memory and national narrative ===
In the 19th century, links between Switzerland and colonialism were the subject of public proclamations and speeches, as evidenced by Numa Droz's enthusiastic praise of Swiss colonizers and explorers in Bern in 1891. In the 20th century, they no longer appear in official historical narration, just like the thousands of Swiss who had participated in colonial wars since the 17th century. While national narratives celebrated the role of Confederate mercenaries in Old Regime Europe, 19th and 20th-century mercenaries were no longer compatible with the liberal values of post-1848 Switzerland.

When the Confederation implemented its development aid policy from this moment, centered on sub-Saharan Africa, it promoted it by highlighting its neutrality and non-membership in former imperial powers. Switzerland's role in negotiations related to the Évian Accords, which ended the Algerian War, increased its sympathy capital in Third World countries emerging from decolonization. It did not hesitate to use this to facilitate the development of economic relations with newly independent countries.

=== Contemporary debates and institutional responses ===
From the second decade of the 21st century, voices arose to question the presence in public space of figures directly or indirectly involved in colonial exploitation or suspected of racism. In 2019, for example, the University of Neuchâtel renamed the Louis Agassiz Space as the Tilo Frey Space. The following year, several Swiss cities (including Neuchâtel, Zurich, and Geneva) opened debate on their colonial heritage, taking up a theme addressed by groups fighting racism in the wake of the Black Lives Matter movement. Confronted with the problem of "decolonizing" their collections, museums intensified provenance research and reflection on possible restitution. Greater attention accorded in public discourse to colonialism's heritage and racism also pushed companies to modify certain product names (confectionery renamed "tête au choco") or shed light on their colonial past.

== Bibliography ==
- Prodolliet, Simone: Wider die Schamlosigkeit und das Elend der heidnischen Weiber. Die Basler Frauenmission und der Export des europäischen Frauenideals in die Kolonien, 1987.
- Daguerre, Mercedes: La costruzione di un mito. Ticinesi d'Argentina. Committenza e architettura 1850-1940, 1998.
- David, Thomas; Etemad, Bouda; Schaufelbuehl, Janick Marina: La Suisse et l'esclavage des Noirs, 2005.
- Perrenoud, Marc: "Les relations de la Suisse avec l'Afrique lors de la décolonisation et des débuts de la coopération au développement", in: Revue internationale de politique de développement, 1, 2010, pp. 81–98.
- Minder, Patrick: La Suisse coloniale. Les représentations de l'Afrique et des Africains en Suisse au temps des colonies (1880-1939), 2011.
- Zangger, Andreas: Koloniale Schweiz. Ein Stück Globalgeschichte zwischen Europa und Südostasien (1860-1930), 2011.
- Purtschert, Patricia; Lüthi, Barbara; Falk, Francesca (éd.): Postkoloniale Schweiz. Formen und Folgen eines Kolonialismus ohne Kolonien, 2012.
- Brändle, Rea: Wildfremd, hautnah. Zürcher Völkerschauen und ihre Schauplätze 1835-1964, 2013.
- Etemad, Bouda; Humbert, Mathieu: "La Suisse est-elle soluble dans sa 'postcolonialité'?", in: Revue suisse d'histoire, 64/2, 2014, pp. 279–291.
- Zürcher, Lukas: Die Schweiz in Ruanda. Mission, Entwicklungshilfe und nationale Selbstbestätigung (1900-1975), 2014.
- Purtschert, Patricia; Fischer-Tiné, Harald (éd.): Colonial Switzerland. Rethinking Colonialism from the Margins, 2015.
- Schär, Bernhard C.: Tropenliebe. Schweizer Naturforscher und niederländischer Imperialismus in Südostasien um 1900, 2015.
- Germann, Pascal: Laboratorien der Vererbung. Rassenforschung und Humangenetik in der Schweiz, 1900-1970, 2016.
- Osterhammel, Jürgen; Jansen, Jan C.: Kolonialismus. Geschichte, Formen, Folgen, 2017^{8} (1995), S. 87-88.
- Veyrassat, Béatrice: Histoire de la Suisse et des Suisses dans la marche du monde (XVIIe siècle – Première Guerre mondiale). Espaces – Circulations – Echanges, 2018.
- Purtschert, Patricia: Kolonialität und Geschlecht im 20. Jahrhundert. Eine Geschichte der weissen Schweiz, 2019.
- Brengard, Marcel; Schubert, Frank; Zürcher, Lukas: Die Beteiligung der Stadt Zürich sowie der Zürcherinnen und Zürcher an Sklaverei und Sklavenhandel vom 17. bis ins 19. Jahrhundert. Bericht zu Handen des Präsidialdepartements der Stadt Zürich, 2020.
- Etienne, Noémie; Brizon, Claire et al. (éd.): Une Suisse exotique? Regarder l'ailleurs en Suisse au siècle des Lumières, 2020 (catalogue d'exposition).
- Arni, Caroline: Lauter Frauen. Zwölf historische Porträts, 2021.
- Krauer, Philipp: "Zwischen Geld, Gewalt und Rassismus. Neue Perspektiven auf die koloniale Schweizer Söldnermigration nach Südostasien, 1848-1914", in: Revue suisse d'histoire, 71/2, 2021, pp. 229–250.
- Pfäffli, Lea: Arktisches Wissen. Schweizer Expeditionen und dänischer Kolonialhandel in Grönland (1908-1913), 2021.
- Rossinelli, Fabio: Géographie et impérialisme. De la Suisse au Congo entre exploration géographique et conquête coloniale, 2022.
- Santos Pinto, Jovita dos; Ohene-Nyako, Pamela et al. (éd.): Un/doing Race. Racialisation en Suisse, 2022.
- Schär, Bernhard C.: "Switzerland, Borneo and the Dutch Indies. Towards a new imperial history of Europe, c.1770-1850", in: Past & Present, 257/1, 2022, pp. 134–167.
- Kreis, Georg: Blicke auf die koloniale Schweiz. Ein Forschungsbericht, 2023.
- Krauer, Philipp: Swiss Mercenaries in the Dutch East Indies. A Transimperial History of Military Labour, 1848-1914, 2024.
- Musée national suisse (éd.): Colonialisme. Une Suisse impliquée, 2024 (catalogue d'exposition).
