= 1881 Swiss federal election =

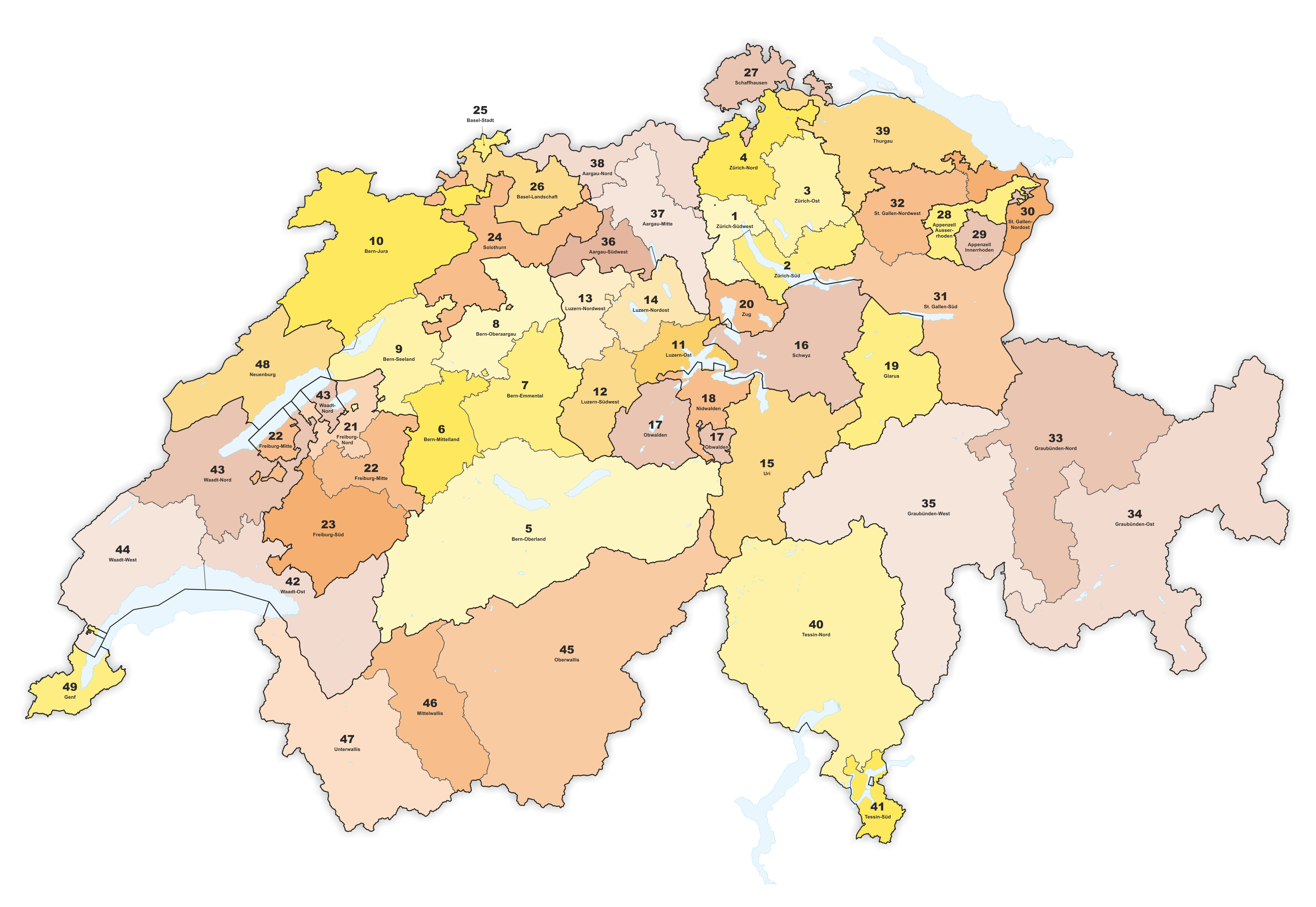
The 49 electoral districts

Federal elections were held in Switzerland on 30 October 1881. The Radical Left remained the largest group in the National Council, regaining the majority they had lost in 1863.

== Electoral system ==
The 145 members of the National Council were elected in 49 single- and multi-member constituencies using a three-round system. Candidates had to receive a majority in the first or second round to be elected; if it went to a third round, only a plurality was required. Voters could cast as many votes as there were seats in their constituency. There was one seat for every 20,000 citizens, with seats allocated to cantons in proportion to their population.

The elections were held under the new Federal law concerning the elections of National Council members passed on 3 May 1881. The number of seats was increased from 135 to 145 following the 1880 census, and the number of constituencies from 48 to 49; Bern and Zürich both gained two seats, whilst Appenzell Ausserrhoden, Basel-Stadt, Geneva, Schwyz, Ticino and Vaud all gained one.

== Results ==
=== National Council ===
Voter turnout was highest in Schaffhausen (where voting was compulsory) at 95.2% and lowest in Schwyz at 28.3%.

Party	Votes	%	Seats	+/–
Radical Left		39.8	75	+18
Catholic Right		24.6	35	–2
Liberal Centre		20.4	22	–4
Democratic Group		7.7	10	0
Evangelical Right		6.1	3	–2
Independents		1.4	0	0
Total			145	+10
Total votes	395,400	–		
Registered voters/turnout	637,224	62.05		
Source: BFS (seats)

==== By constituency ====
Constituency	Seats	Party	Seats won	Elected members
Zürich 1	5	Liberal Centre	5	Wilhelm Hertenstein; Melchior Römer; Alfred Escher; Johannes Ryf; Johann Kaspar Baumann
Zürich 2	4	Liberal Centre	3	Heinrich Landis; Jakob Brennwald; Johann Heinrich Bühler
Zürich 2	4	Democratic Group	1	Johann Jakob Keller
Zürich 3	4	Democratic Group	4	Johannes Stössel; Friedrich Salomon Vögelin; Salomon Bleuler; Ludwig Forrer
Zürich 4	3	Democratic Group	3	Johannes Moser; Friedrich Scheuchzer; Johann Jakob Sulzer
Bern 5	5	Radical Left	5	Friedrich Seiler; Carl Samuel Zyro; Johann Zürcher; Jakob Scherz; Johannes Ritschard
Bern 6	5	Radical Left	3	Johann Jakob Hauser; Rudolf Brunner; Rudolf Rohr
Bern 6	5	Evangelical Right	1	Otto von Büren
Bern 6	5	Liberal Centre	1	Jules Schnyder
Bern 7	4	Radical Left	4	Karl Schenk; Gottlieb Riem; Karl Karrer; Gottlieb Berger
Bern 8	4	Radical Left	4	Johann Friedrich Gugelmann; Johann Bützberger; Andreas Schmid; Rudolf Leuenberger
Bern 9	4	Radical Left	4	Johannes Schlup; Charles Kuhn; Rudolf Niggeler; Bendicht Tschannen
Bern 10	5	Radical Left	5	Niklaus Kaiser; Ernest Francillon; Joseph Stockmar; Auguste-Adolphe Klaye; Henri Cuenat
Lucerne 11	2	Radical Left	2	Josef Vonmatt; Friedrich Wüest
Lucerne 12	1	Catholic Right	1	Josef Zemp
Lucerne 13	2	Catholic Right	2	Josef Erni; Candid Hochstrasser
Lucerne 14	2	Catholic Right	2	Philipp Anton von Segesser; Franz Xaver Beck
Uri 15	1	Catholic Right	1	Josef Arnold
Schwyz 16	3	Catholic Right	3	Ambros Eberle; Fridolin Holdener; Vital Schwander Sr.
Obwalden 17	1	Catholic Right	1	Nicolaus Hermann
Nidwalden 18	1	Catholic Right	1	Robert Durrer
Glarus 19	2	Liberal Centre	1	Esajas Zweifel
Glarus 19	2	Radical Left	1	Niklaus Tschudi
Zug 20	1	Catholic Right	1	Niklaus Moos
Fribourg 21	2	Radical Left	2	Eduard Huber; Louis-Auguste Marmier
Fribourg 22	2	Catholic Right	2	Laurent Chaney; Louis de Wuilleret
Fribourg 23	2	Catholic Right	2	Louis Grand; Joseph Jaquet
Solothurn 24	4	Radical Left	3	Oskar Munzinger; Simon Kaiser; Albert Brosi
Solothurn 24	4	Liberal Centre	1	Bernhard Hammer
Basel-Stadt 25	3	Radical Left	2	Karl Burckhardt-Iselin; Wilhelm Klein
Basel-Stadt 25	3	Liberal Centre	1	Johann Rudolf Geigy-Merian
Basel-Landschaft 26	3	Radical Left	3	Jakob Bernhard Graf; Emil Frey; Gédéon Thommen
Schaffhausen 27	2	Radical Left	2	Wilhelm Joos; Robert Grieshaber
Appenzell Ausserrhoden 28	3	Liberal Centre	1	Daniel Hofstetter; Johann Ulrich Schiess
Appenzell Ausserrhoden 28	3	Radical Left	1	Johann Conrad Sonderegger
Appenzell Innerhoden 29	1	Liberal Centre	1	Karl Justin Sonderegger
St. Gallen 30	4	Liberal Centre	2	Thomas Thoma; Arnold Otto Aepli
St. Gallen 30	4	Catholic Right	1	Johann Gebhard Lutz
St. Gallen 30	4	Evangelical Right	1	Carl von Gonzenbach
St. Gallen 31	3	Liberal Centre	1	Rudolf Hilty
St. Gallen 31	3	Catholic Right	1	Wilhelm Good
St. Gallen 31	3	Democratic Group	1	Carl Theodor Curti
St. Gallen 32	3	Catholic Right	2	Johann Fridolin Müller; Johann Joseph Keel
St. Gallen 32	3	Liberal Centre	1	Johann Rudolf Moser
Grisons 33	2	Liberal Centre	1	Simeon Bavier
Grisons 33	2	Evangelical Right	1	Hermann J. von Sprecher
Grisons 34	2	Catholic Right	2	Caspar Decurtins; Johann Schmid
Grisons 35	1	Radical Left	1	Andrea Bezzola
Aargau 36	3	Radical Left	3	Arnold Künzli; Ludwig Karrer; Erwin Kurz
Aargau 37	4	Radical Left	2	Hans Riniker; Robert Straub
Aargau 37	4	Liberal Centre	2	Johann Rohr; Anton Bruggisser
Aargau 38	3	Catholic Right	2	Emil Albert Baldinger; Karl von Schmid
Aargau 38	3	Liberal Centre	1	Emil Welti
Thurgau 39	5	Radical Left	3	Johann Philipp Heitz; Friedrich Heinrich Häberlin; Gustav Merkle
Thurgau 39	5	Liberal Centre	1	Jakob Huldreich Bachmann
Thurgau 39	5	Democratic Group	1	Adolf Deucher
Ticino 40	2	Radical Left	2	Carlo Battaglini; Costantino Bernasconi
Ticino 41	5	Catholic Right	5	Martino Pedrazzini; Carlo Vonmentlen; Ignazio Polar; Giovanni Dazzoni; Agostino Gatti
Vaud 42	5	Radical Left	5	Louis Ruchonnet; Jules Brun; Louis Mayor; David Joly; Antoine Vessaz
Vaud 43	4	Radical Left	4	Paul Wulliémoz; Georges-Louis Contesse; Adolphe Jordan; Frédéric Criblet
Vaud 44	3	Radical Left	3	Henri Oguey; Charles Baud; Jules Colomb
Valais 45	2	Catholic Right	2	Victor de Chastonay; Hans Anton von Roten
Valais 46	1	Catholic Right	1	Maurice Evéquoz
Valais 47	2	Catholic Right	2	Charles de Werra; Fidèle Joris
Neuchâtel 48	5	Radical Left	5	Numa Droz; Jules Philippin; Auguste Albert Leuba; Charles-Émile Tissot; Henri Morel
Geneva 49	4	Radical Left	4	Antoine Carteret; Georges Favon; Pierre Moriaud; Moïse Vautier
Geneva 49	4	Liberal Centre	1	Arthur Chenevière
Source: Gruner

=== Council of States ===
Party	Seats	+/–
Catholic Right	18	+1
Radical Left	17	+6
Liberal Centre	4	–7
Democratic Left	3	+1
Evangelical Right	1	+1
Independents	1	–1
Total	44	0
Source: The Federal Assembly
