= Charles Wyrsch =

Swiss artist and painter (1920–2019)

Charles Wyrsch (5 July 1920 – 16 June 2019) was a Swiss artist and painter.

== Early life ==
Wyrsch was born in Buochs, Nidwalden in July 1920. His mother died seven days after having given birth on puerperal fever. His father, Carl II Wyrsch, married a second time. From this marriage came eight children. Wyrsch grew up with his grandparents, Carl I and Maria in Buochs. From 1935 to 1938, he was trained as a painter at his father's place.

Like his great-granduncle Johann Melchior Wyrsch, he aspired to study in depth art in some of the most prestigious Swiss and French art schools.

== Art studies ==
From 1939 to 1943 he attended the School of Applied Arts in Lucerne.

In the same year Wyrsch left for academic study at the "Ecole des Beaux-Arts" in Geneva. To top off his studies, he was awarded the Prize of the City of Geneva. This price included the use of a studio for a year, five hundred francs and ten days' journey to Paris with art students from all over Switzerland. Back in Switzerland, he took three months private lessons with Albert Pfister in Erlenbach and learned to know the Fauves and the Expressionists.

After this examination favored by Pfister on colors he followed another program at a school of applied arts, this time in Basel with Ernst Buchner and the sculptor Walter Bodmer, with whom he mainly dealt with matters of form. In 1949 he temporarily moved to Paris.

== Personal life ==
In 1953, he married Edith Hug and settled to Lachen Schwyz. He got his first big orders and successes.

The municipality of Buochs ordered a fresco for the new school building. In the 1950s Wyrsch painted his first series of paintings of the "barons". The elongated faces with hat reminiscent of Modigliani and Utrillo, their paintings he learned during his time in Paris. The turning point in the creative process of Wyrsch took place towards the end of 1950.

Wyrsch died in June 2019 at the age of 98.

=== Lucerne ===
In 1961, he moved with his family to Lucerne. In the monograph by Markus Brischgi (1990), he says: "... The objectivity had driven me into a corner; I destroyed many works and painted with a palette knife in a true color turmoil new pictures ... ". Up to this point, he was committed to the real matter and traditional painting. The affinity for abstraction is a key moment in his life, acting on his later representational paintings.

During this time he also abstracted images of Christ. The Passion theme was deepened by the dramatic experience of the death of his three-year-old little daughter who died on a Good Friday. Under this impression he painted his most famous work, the "Stations of the Cross", 1966, for the Pius Church in Meggen.

=== Kriens ===
In 1971, he moved with his family to Kriens where he bought an atelier house from a painter. In the 1970s, finds Wyrsch, through the stimulation of Bacon's art which represents a new vision of objectivity, to represent back to the people.

In the previously mentioned monography of 1990, he said: "... Bacon's new view of objectivity awakened in me the desire to return to figurative representation of the people, after I had designed color spaces under the influence of Mark Rothko."

He struggled for forms of expressions in a new and accurate representation of the people in our time. Art was for him the medium coverage. Under the impact of increasing environmental devastation followed from 1980 his work referred to him as "the enemy and the protest pictures" with titles like "concrete", "aggression", "flight" or "drug-related".

== Work ==
=== Style ===
Wyrsch's artistic career was based on the expressive of figurative paintings, which he gave up in favor of abstraction for about ten years, to return to the figurative.

His motives were selected by Wyrsch from the traditional genus species. He dealt with Diego Velásquez and El Greco and was inspired by contemporaries. But his paintings remain independent and can be assigned to any style. He described himself as a man of the present and was open to everything new. But he suffered from the threat to nature and the loneliness of man. There were issues that he liked to present in his works. In nudes and portraits, including many self-portraits he expressed this suffering, to his person sometimes bluntly.

=== Exhibitions ===
- Charles Wyrsch, Sarnen, Galerie Hofmatt Sarnen 30.5.2015–28 June 2015
- Charles Wyrsch. Crânes, Lucerne, Alpineum-Produzentengalerie 8.11.2014–6.12.2014
- Tandem. Junge Künstler/innen begegnen Altmeistern der "Innnerschweizer Innerlichkeit" und ihren Zeitgenossen – 40 Jahre danach. Sursee, Sankturbanhof 24.9.2011–1 January 2012
- Tandem. Junge Künstler/innen begegnen Altmeistern der "Innnerschweizer Innerlichkeit" und ihren Zeitgenossen – 40 Jahre danach. Altdorf, Uri, Haus für Kunst 18.9.2011–27 November 2011
- Tandem. Junge Künstler/innen begegnen Altmeistern der "Innnerschweizer Innerlichkeit" und ihren Zeitgenossen – 40 Jahre danach. Sachseln, Museum Bruder Klaus 4.9.2011–1.11.2011
- Tandem. Junge Künstler/innen begegnen Altmeistern der "Innnerschweizer Innerlichkeit" und ihren Zeitgenossen – 40 Jahre danach. Stans, Nidwaldner Museum 3.9.2011–30 October 2011
- Tandem. Junge Künstler/innen begegnen Altmeistern der "Innnerschweizer Innerlichkeit" und ihren Zeitgenossen – 40 Jahre danach. Lucerne, Hochschule Luzern – Design & Kunst 4.0.2011–30 October 2011
- Charles Wyrsch. Peinture, Kriens, Museum im Bellpark 22.8.2010–14 October 2010
- Charles Wyrsch. Dessins, gravures, peintures, Vevey, Galerie Arts et Lettres 13.2.2009–15 March 2009
- Jahresausstellung Zentralschweizer Kunstschaffen 2008, Lucerne, Kunstmuseum Luzern 6.12.2008–15 February 2008
- «KÜR"-Kantonale Kunst und Käufe Obwalden, Sachseln, Museum Bruder Klaus 16.3.2008–15 June 2008
- Top of central Switzerland, Lucerne, Kunstmuseum Luzern, 15.12.2007–17 February 2008
- Im Kabinett: Charles Wyrsch. Selbstportraits, Emmenbrücke, Galerie Gersag Emmen, 20.1.2007–25 February 2007
- Stilles Leben. Aus der Sammlung der Gemeinde Emmen und der Kunststiftung Emmen, Emmenbrücke, Galerie Gersag Emmen, 1.9.2006–8.10.2006
- Zentralschweizer Kunstschaffen. Jahresausstellung 2005, Lucerne, Neues Kunstmuseum Luzern, 9.12.2005–29 January 2006
- Zentralschweizer Kunstschaffen. Jahresausstellung 2004, Lucerne, Kunstmuseum Luzern, 4.12.2004–1 January 2005
- Charles Wyrsch. Aufzeichner und Auslöscher, Lucerne, Kunstmuseum Luzern, 19.10.2002–1.12.2002
- Kreuze der Gegenwart. Deutung + Vision, Einsiedeln, Panorama, 20.5.2001–14 October 2001
- Charles Wyrsch mit Cécile Wick und Teresa Chen, Stans, Nidwaldner Museum 28.5.2000–16 July 2000
- Meine hunderste Ausstellung. Ein Überblick von 1981–1999, Zell, Galerie Priska Meier, 5.12.1999–9.1.2000
- (Teil II), Lucerne, Kunstmuseum Luzern, 20.1.1999–14 February 1999
- (Teil I), Lucerne, Kunstmuseum Luzern, 19.12.1998–10.1.1999
- 3 x Wyrsch, Lucerne. Raum für aktuelle Kunst, 22.8.1998–13 September 1998
- Saxifrage, désespoir du peintre. La tendence expressive dans la peinture suisse contemporaine, Sion, Musée cantonal des beaux-arts, Sion, 20.6.1998–10.1.1999
- Saxifrage, désespoir du peintre. La tendence expressive dans la peinture suisse contemporaine, Fribourg, Musée d'art et d'histoire, Fribourg, 28.2.1997–1.6.1997
- Charles Wyrsch, Lucerne, Kunstmuseum Luzern, 16.3.1996–28 April 1996
- Aus der Innerschweiz, Berne, Galerie V.Müller, 27.10.1995–18 November 1995
- Expressiv. Schweizer Kunst des 20. Jahrhunderts aus der Sammlung Anliker, Lucerne, Kunstmuseum Luzern, 11.7.1992–20 September 1992
- 8 Unterwalder Künstler, Basel, Kaserne, 26.3.1988–17 April 1988
- 8 Unterwalder Künstler, Sarnen, Altes Zeughaus auf dem Landenberg, 20.2.1988–13 March 1988
- 10 Innerschweizer, Thun, Alte Mühle, 8.6.1985–7 July 1985
- Kunstprojekt altes Zuchthaus Sarnen, Sarnen, Altes Zuchthaus Sarnen, 14.8.1983–1.10.1983
- Charles Wyrsch, Olten, Kunstmuseum Olten, 24.4.1983–29 May 1983
- Kunstmuseum Luzern. Weihnachtsausstellung der Innerschweizer Künstler. Sonderausstellung Peter Amstutz. Lucerne, Kunstmuseum Luzern, 12.12.1982–16 January 1983
- Unterwalder, Glarus, Kunsthaus Glarus, 26.6.1982–8 August 1982
- Une oeuvre – un artiste. Un artiste – une oeuvre. Exposition Suisse '81, Delémont, Halles des expositions, 22.10.1981–8.11.1981
- Charles Wyrsch, Lucernr, Kunstmuseum Luzern, 7.12.1980–11.1.1981
- 3. Biennale der Schweizer Kunst. Aktualität Vergangenheit, Winterthur, Kunstmuseum Winterthur, 2.4.1978–28 May 1978
- Joseph Beuys, Michael Buthe, Franz Eggenschwiler und die Berner Werkgemeinschaft (Konrad Vetter, Robert Welti) Markus Raetz, Diter Rot, Lucerne, Kunstmuseum Luzern, 19.9.1970–25 October 1970
- Inner-Schweizer Künstler, Olten, Stadthaus Olten, 19.4.1968–19 May 1968
- Schweizerische Kunstausstellung, Lucerne, Kunstmuseum Luzern, 24.6.1961–30 July 1961
- Schweizerische Kunstausstellung Basel 1956, Basel, Baslerhalle der Schweizer Mustermesse, 2.6.1956–15 July 1956
- Fünf junge Innerschweizer Künstler. Franco Annoni, Rolf Brem, Rolf Meyer-List, Paul Stöckli, Charles Wyrsch, Winterthur, Kunstmuseum Winterthur, 10.5.1953–21 May 1953

=== Literature ===
- Tandem. Junge Künstler/innen begegnen Altmeistern der "Innnerschweizer Innerlichkeit" und ihren Zeitgenossen – 40 Jahre danach. 2011
- Charles Wyrsch. Peinture 2010
- ‹Für viele beginnt hier ihre Existenz als Künstler› 2008
- Kantonale Kunst Käufe Obwalden. 1999–2007 2008
- Kirchen und Kapellen in Buochs 2007
- Tiefe Falten werden hohe Kunst 2007
- Top of central Switzerland 2007
- Die Kunstsammlung des Kantons Schwyz. Malerei und Plastik bis 2004 2006
- Die Selbstbildnisse des Malers Charles Wyrsch 2004
- Im Dienst der Kunstsammlung 2004
- Die Heimat immer neu erfinden 2003
- Ein Künstler sieht sich selbst 2002
- Altersporträts und Aktmalereien von Charles Wyrsch 2002
- Sehen, spüren und malen im Raum 2002
- Kreuze der Gegenwart. Deutung + Vision 2001
- Zentralschweizer Kunst 2001
- Dschungelausstellung über fast alles 2001
- Kreuze 2001
- Erotik oder Sex? – Hauptsache es macht Spass 2001
- Der alte Mann und die jungen Frauen 2000
- Er will sich ein Bildnis machen 2000
- "Malen ist wahnsinnig schwer". Kurt Albissers Film über den Maler Charles Wyrsch 2000
- Saxifrage, désespoir du peintre. La tendence expressive dans la peinture suisse contemporaine 1997
- Charles Wyrsch 1996
- Kunstmuseum Olten. Neuzugänge 1983–1992 1993
- Expressiv. Schweizer Kunst des 20. Jahrhunderts aus der Sammlung Anliker 1992
- Charles Wyrsch. Werke 1942–1990 1990
- 8 Unterwalder Künstler 1988
- Einsichten. Innerschweizer Maler, Bildhauer und Architekten. Gespräche und Bilder aus 90 Ateliers 1985
- 10 Innerschweizer 1985
- Charles Wyrsch 1983
- Verein für Originalgraphik 1948–1982 1982
- Kunstmuseum Luzern. Weihnachtsausstellung der Innerschweizer Künstler. Sonderausstellung Peter Amstutz 1982
- Unterwalder 1982
- Une oeuvre – un artiste. Un artiste – une oeuvre. Exposition Suisse '81 1981
- Charles Wyrsch 1980
- 3. Biennale der Schweizer Kunst. Aktualität Vergangenheit 1978
- Der Kreuzweg in Meggen 1976
- Innerschweizer Kunst – Stansort 1973. Wanderausstellung unter dem Patronat der GSMBA, Sektion Innerschweiz 1973
- Innerschweizer Almanach 1972
- Joseph Beuys, Michael Buthe, Franz Eggenschwiler und die Berner Werkgemeinschaft (Konrad Vetter, Robert Welti) Markus Raetz, Diter Rot 1970
- Inner-Schweizer Künstler 1968
- 100 Jahre Gesellschaft Schweizerischer Maler, Bildhauer und Architekten 1865–1965 1965
- Schweizerische Kunstausstellung Basel 1956 1956

=== Awards ===
- Krienser Kulturpreis 1995
- Kunst- und Kulturpreis der Stadt Luzern, 1980
- Johann-Melchior-Wyrsch-Preis 1977
- Anerkennungspreis der Stadt Luzern, 1965
- Eidgenössisches Kunststipendium, 1960
- Eidgenössisches Kunststipendium, 1956
- Eidgenössisches Kunststipendium, 1953

=== Books ===
- Edith by Charles Wyrsch, Edition Periferia, 2002 – 56 pages
- Charles Wyrsch: Werke 1942–1990 by Markus Britschgi, Edition P. von Matt, 1990 – 167 pages
- Charles Wyrsch Peinture by Hilar Stadler, Jean-Christophe Amman 2010 – 108 pages
