= Louis Wyrsch =

Swiss politician and military commander

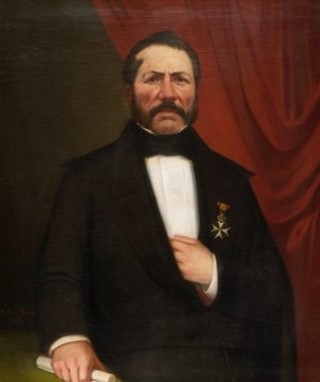
- Wyrsch portrayed by Karl-Georg Kaiser

Member of the Constitutional Council of Switzerland
- In office 1849
- Constituency: Canton of Nidwalden

Personal details
- Born: Franz Alois Wyrsch; 2 March 1793 Bellinzona, Switzerland
- Died: 21 April 1858 (aged 65) Ennetbürgen, Switzerland
- Spouse: Johanna van den Berg (m. 1824) Theresia Stockmann (m. 1834)
- Occupation: Military commander, politician

Military service
- Allegiance: Dutch East Indies (1815–1832); Switzerland (since 1832)

Franz Alois Wyrsch (Swiss Standard German: [ˈluːi viːrʃ]; 2 March 1793 – 21 April 1858), colloquially Louis Wyrsch, often nicked Borneo Louis, was a Swiss politician and military commander. In 1816, Wyrsch entered the Royal Netherlands East Indies Army as a mercenary after serving in the Royal Netherlands Army in the Battle of Waterloo in 1815.

In 1832, he returned to Switzerland, and took high-ranking offices in the Canton of Nidwalden, where he was originally from. In 1849, he was a member of the Constitutional Council of Switzerland, and was among those who constructed the Swiss Federal Constitution.

== Early life and education ==
Franz Alois Wyrsch was born on 2 March 1793 in Bellinzona, as the son of Franz Alois Wyrsch Sr., bailiff of the Riviera, commissioner in Bellinzona and captain in the service of Spain, and Marie Konstantia Wyrsch (née von Flüe). The Wyrsch family was originally from Buochs in Nidwalden on Lake Lucerne. He was a grandson of Benedikt Niklaus von Flüe and the nephew of Michael von Flüe.

He was educated at the Royal Seminary of San Pablo in Valencia and his father's regiment in Spain. After his father's death in 1807, he returned to Nidwalden and finished his education at the Rheinau conventual school in 1812. Wyrsch then went to do an apprenticeship in Belfort.

== Career ==
Wyrsch joined the Royal Netherlands Army as a soldier in 1814 and took part in the Battle of Waterloo.

He joined the Dutch colonial troops in Java, Bali and Borneo in 1815. He was a military and civil commander on the southern and eastern coasts of Borneo (1829-1832).

In 1832 he returned to Nidwalden where he was a bailiff between 1834 and 1840 and a major of Nidwalden's army between 1834 and 1847.

Wyrsch was first elected Nidwalden's head of state (landammann) on 25 April 1841. He was reelected in 1845, 1848, 1849, 1851, 1853, 1855 and 1857. He was commander of the Nidwalden battalion during the Sonderbund war in 1847, a member of commission which drafted the Swiss constitution in 1849 and president of the municipality of Ennetbürgen between 1850 and 1857.

His rapid rise in the Dutch colonial army was distinguished by his laying the foundations for Borneo's infrastructure.

In Nidwalden, he bought the Au mill in Ennetbürgen in 1839 and earned his living as a miller.

His moderate liberal and military experience made him politically widely accepted.

Let us take the example of Nidwalden's Landammann, Louis Wyrsch (1793-1858). The contemporaries called this liberal Catholic patrician "Borneo Louis". Wyrsch had earned his spurs not in Switzerland but in the service of the Dutch in the conquest of Southborne in the 1820s. In bloody wars, the young Nidwald officer distinguished himself several times and climbed the career ladder. As a military and civilian commander, Borneo Louis ruled over a seventy thousand souls, mostly colonized by Bataken, for several years, thus defending European trade interests in Southeast Asia. He was dependent on the cooperation of numerous local nobles and Chinese intermediate traders, from whom he learned not only fluent Malay, but also some other things. When he returned to Nidwalden with a troublesome war and an order of the Dutch king in 1832, he was immediately appointed to Landmann of his only 11,000 inhabitants, and finally, the commander of the Nidwald's troops in the short Swiss Civil War. Until his death in 1858 he ruled not only Nidwald, but also represented his canton in the National Council. Then his son Alois inherited the high offices. This is worth mentioning when he was born in Borneo. His mother was a Javanese Malay, and Alois Wyrsch was therefore the first countryman and Swiss parliamentarians "of color", as one would say today.

=== Swiss Constitution ===
He was a drafting member of the Swiss Constitution.

The Swiss Constitution was created by Ulrich Ochsenbein who headed it along with the following other members: Jonas Furrer, Jakob Robert Steiger, Franz Jauch, Melchior Diethelm, Alois Michel, Caspar Jenny-Becker, Franz Müller, Jean-François Marcellin Bussard, Josef Munzinger, Johann Georg Fürstenberger, later Felix Sarasin, Karl Spitteler, Johann Georg Böschenstein, Johann Konrad Oertli, Wilhelm Matthias Näff, Raget Abys, Friedrich Frey-Herosé, Johann Konrad Kern, Giacomo Luvini-Perseghini, Henri Druey, Maurice Barman, later Franz Kaspar Zen Ruffinen and Louis Rilliet.

He was made knight 4th class of the Military Order of William of the Netherlands on 21 October 1832.

== Personal life ==
In 1824, Wyrsch married Johanna van den Berg (who went by Silla in Malay), a woman of Java, Malaysia. She stayed in the Dutch Indies while he returned to Nidwalden, Switzerland in 1832 with two of the eldest children from that relationship.

- Alois Wyrsch (15 June 1825 – 6 March 1888), who served on the National Council (Switzerland), as the first person of color.

Two years later, in 1834 Wyrsch married Theresia Stockmann, the daughter of Felix Josef Stockmann.

Wyrsch died on 21 April 1858 in Ennetbürgen aged 65.
