= 1860 Swiss federal election =

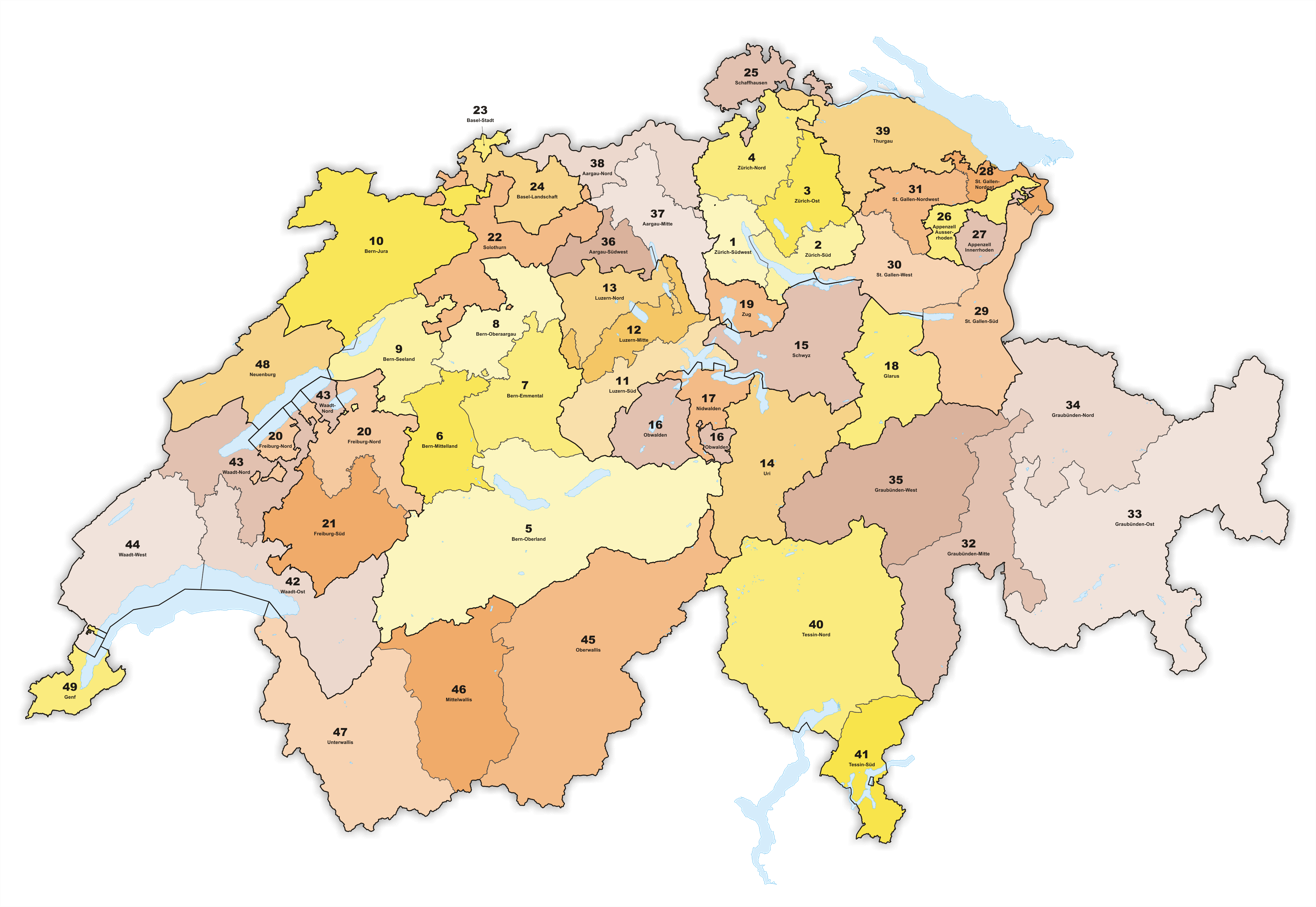
The 49 electoral districts

Federal elections were held in Switzerland on 28 October 1860. Despite large losses, the Radical Left remained the largest group in the National Council, winning 64 of the 120 seats.

== Electoral system ==
The 120 members of the National Council were elected in 49 single- and multi-member constituencies; there was one seat for every 20,000 citizens, with seats allocated to cantons in proportion to their population. The elections were held using a three-round system; candidates had to receive a majority in the first or second round to be elected; if it went to a third round, only a plurality was required. Voters could cast as many votes as there were seats in their constituency. In six cantons (Appenzell Innerrhoden, Appenzell Ausserrhoden, Glarus, Nidwalden, Obwalden and Uri), National Council members were elected by the Landsgemeinde.

== Results ==
=== National Council ===
Voter turnout was highest in the Canton of Schaffhausen (where voting was compulsory) at 86.4% and lowest in the Canton of Zürich at 8.9%.

Graph of the party split among 120 seats.
Party	First round			Second round			Third round			Total seats
Party	Votes	%	Seats	Votes	%	Seats	Votes	%	Seats	Total seats
Radical Left	360,259	51.46	53	41,939	50.34	5	12,498	50.29	2	60
Liberal Centre	161,709	23.10	33	25,141	30.17	4	9,087	36.56	1	38
Catholic Right	110,828	15.83	16	5,975	7.17	0				16
Evangelical Right	36,448	5.21	2	9,884	11.86	1	3,267	13.15	0	3
Democratic Left	21,619	3.09	1	380	0.46	0				1
Radical Left dissidents	9,213	1.32	2							2
Total	700,076	100.00	107	83,319	100.00	10	24,852	100.00	3	120
Total votes	265,730	–		76,097	–		26,616	–		
Registered voters/turnout	541,670	49.06								
Source: BFS

==== By constituency ====
Constituency	Seats	Party	Seats won	Elected members
Zürich 1	4	Liberal Centre	3	Alfred Escher; Johann Jakob Treichler; Georg Joseph Sidler
Zürich 1	4	Evangelical Right	1	Paul Carl Eduard Ziegler
Zürich 2	3	Liberal Centre	3	Jonas Furrer; Hermann Stadtmann; Karl Adolf Huber
Zürich 3	3	Liberal Centre	3	Hans Heinrich Zangger; Rudolf Wäffler; Heinrich Rüegg
Zürich 4	3	Liberal Centre	3	Rudolf Benz; Ulrich Meister Sr.; Johann Jakob Bucher
Bern 5	4	Radical Left	4	Karl Engemann; Johann Jakob Karlen; Jakob Karlen; Jakob Scherz
Bern 6	4	Evangelical Right	2	Christoph Albert Kurz; Eduard Blösch
Bern 6	4	Radical Left	2	Jakob Stämpfli; Niklaus Niggeler
Bern 7	4	Radical Left	4	Karl Karrer; Johann Ulrich Gfeller; Samuel Lehmann; Rudolf Schmid
Bern 8	4	Radical Left	4	Johann Rudolf Vogel; Jakob Steiner; Johann Bützberger; Johann Weber
Bern 9	3	Radical Left	3	Johann Rudolf Schneider; Christian Sahli; Jean Sessler
Bern 10	4	Radical Left	4	Paul Migy; Édouard Carlin; Xavier Stockmar; Cyprien Revel
Lucerne 11	2	Liberal Centre	1	Josef Martin Knüsel
Lucerne 11	2	Radical Left	1	Josef Bucher
Lucerne 12	2	Catholic Right	2	Philipp Anton von Segesser; Vinzenz Fischer
Lucerne 13	3	Radical Left	3	Casimir Pfyffer; Josef Sigmund Bühler; Franz Widmer
Uri 14	1	Catholic Right	1	Alexander Muheim
Schwyz 15	2	Catholic Right	2	Karl Styger; Josef Anton Georg Büeler
Obwalden 16	1	Catholic Right	1	Franz Wirz
Nidwalden 17	1	Radical Left	1	Alois Wyrsch
Glarus 18	2	Liberal Centre	2	Joachim Heer; Peter Jenny
Zug 19	1	Liberal Centre	1	Wolfgang Henggeler
Fribourg 20	3	Catholic Right	2	François-Xavier Bondallaz; Alfred Vonderweid
Fribourg 20	3	Liberal Centre	1	Johann Anton Engelhard
Fribourg 21	2	Catholic Right	2	Louis de Wuilleret; Hubert Charles
Solothurn 22	3	Radical Left	2	Simon Kaiser; Benedikt von Arx
Solothurn 22	3	Catholic Right	1	Franz Bünzli
Basel-Stadt 23	1	Liberal Centre	1	Johann Jakob Stehlin
Basel-Landschaft 24	2	Radical Left	2	Daniel Bieder; Stephan Gutzwiller
Schaffhausen 25	2	Radical Left	1	Friedrich Peyer im Hof
Schaffhausen 25	2	Liberal Centre	1	Johann Heinrich Ammann
Appenzell Ausserrhoden 26	2	Liberal Centre	2	Johannes Roth; Adolf Friedrich Zürcher
Appenzell Innerhoden 27	1	Catholic Right	1	Johann Baptist Dähler
St. Gallen 28	2	Liberal Centre	2	Wilhelm Matthias Naeff; Joseph Marzell Hoffmann
St. Gallen 29	2	Liberal Centre	2	Josef Leonhard Bernold; Paravizin Hilty
St. Gallen 30	2	Radical Left	1	Johann Rudolf Raschle
St. Gallen 30	2	Democratic Left	1	Basil Ferdinand Curti
St. Gallen 31	2	Radical Left	2	Johann Matthias Hungerbühler; Carl Georg Jakob Sailer
Grisons 32	1	Radical Left	1	Johann Bartholome Caflisch
Grisons 33	1	Liberal Centre	1	Andreas Rudolf von Planta
Grisons 34	1	Radical Left	1	Johann Gaudenz von Salis
Grisons 35	1	Radical Left	1	Caspar de Latour
Aargau 36	3	Liberal Centre	3	Friedrich Frey-Herosé; Carl Feer-Herzog; Samuel Frey
Aargau 37	4	Liberal Centre	2	Johann Rudolf Ringier; Gottlieb Jäger
Aargau 37	4	Radical Left	2	Johann Peter Bruggisser; Franz Waller
Aargau 38	3	Radical Left	2	Augustin Keller; Friedrich Joseph Bürli
Aargau 38	3	Catholic Right	1	Wilhelm Karl Baldinger
Thurgau 39	4	Radical Left	3	Johann Ludwig Sulzberger; Johann Georg Kreis; Johann Baptist von Streng
Thurgau 39	4	Liberal Centre	1	Johann Messmer
Ticino 40	3	Radical Left	3	Giacomo Luvini; Carlo Soldini; Giovanni Battista Ramelli
Ticino 41	3	Radical Left	2	Giovanni Jauch; Giovanni Battista Pioda
Ticino 41	3	Catholic Right	1	Michele Pedrazzini
Vaud 42	4	Radical Left	2	Constant Fornerod; François Corboz
Vaud 42	4	Liberal Centre	2	Édouard Dapples; Henri Jan
Vaud 43	3	Radical Left	2	Charles Estoppey; Samuel Déglon
Vaud 43	3	Liberal Centre	1	Jean-Louis Demiéville
Vaud 44	3	Radical Left	2	Louis-Henri Delarageaz; Jean-Louis Ancrenaz
Vaud 44	3	Liberal Centre	1	Charles Bontems
Valais 45	1	Catholic Right	1	Alexis Allet
Valais 46	1	Catholic Right	1	Adrien de Courten
Valais 47	2	Radical Left	2	Louis Barman; Joseph Torrent
Neuchâtel 48	4	Radical Left	2	Alexis-Marie Piaget; Jules Philippin
Neuchâtel 48	4	Dissident Radical Left	2	Ami Girard; Louis Grandpierre
Geneva 49	3	Radical Left	2	James Fazy; Jean-Jacques Challet-Venel
Geneva 49	3	Liberal Centre	1	Philippe Camperio
Source: Gruner

=== Council of States ===
Party	Seats	+/–
Catholic Right	13	–1
Liberal Centre	13	+2
Radical Left	13	0
Evangelical Right	1	+1
Democratic Left	0	0
Independents	4	+2
Total	44	0
Source: Federal Assembly
