= Beckenried =

- Municipality
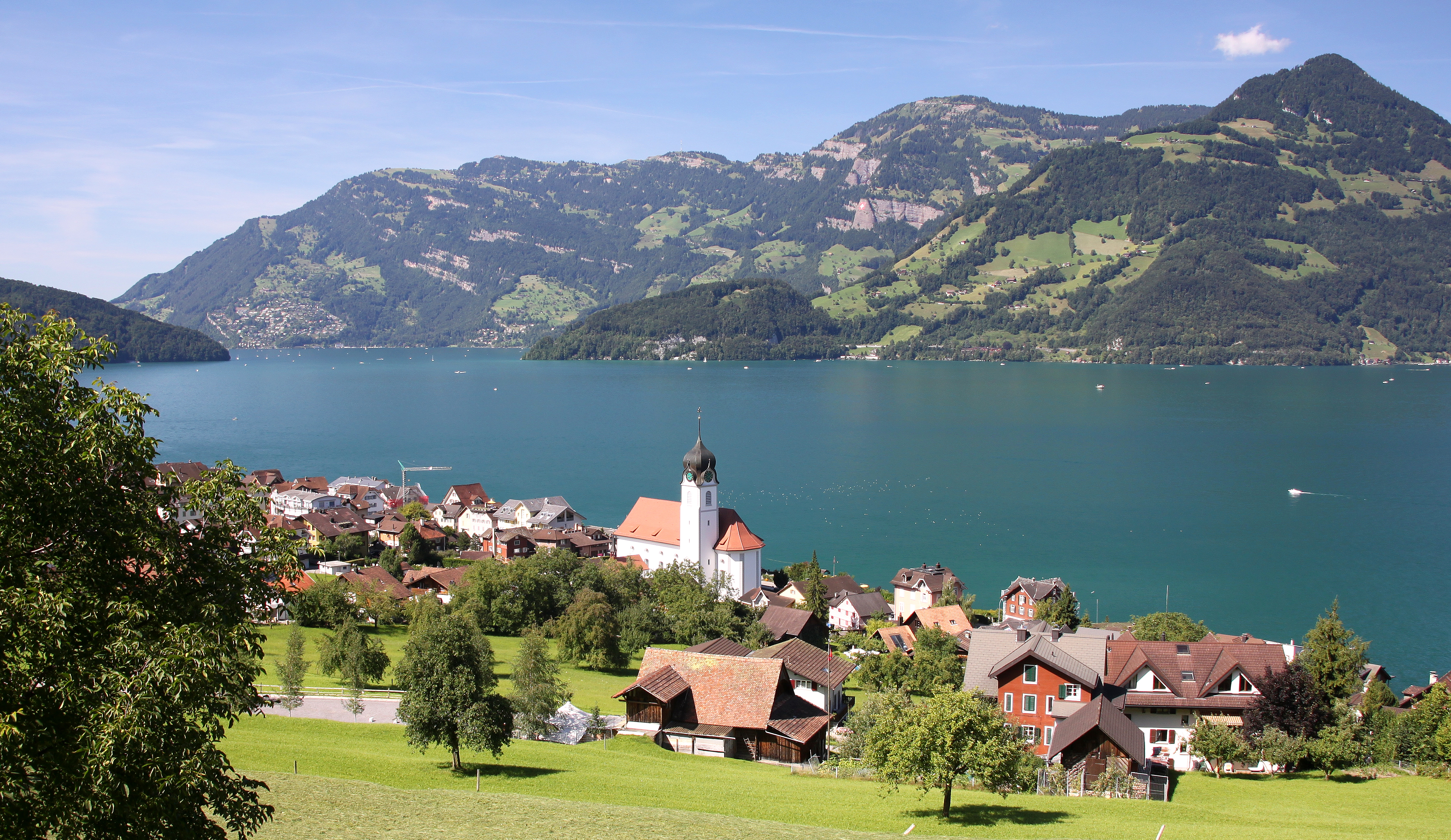

- Flag Coat of arms
- Location of Beckenried
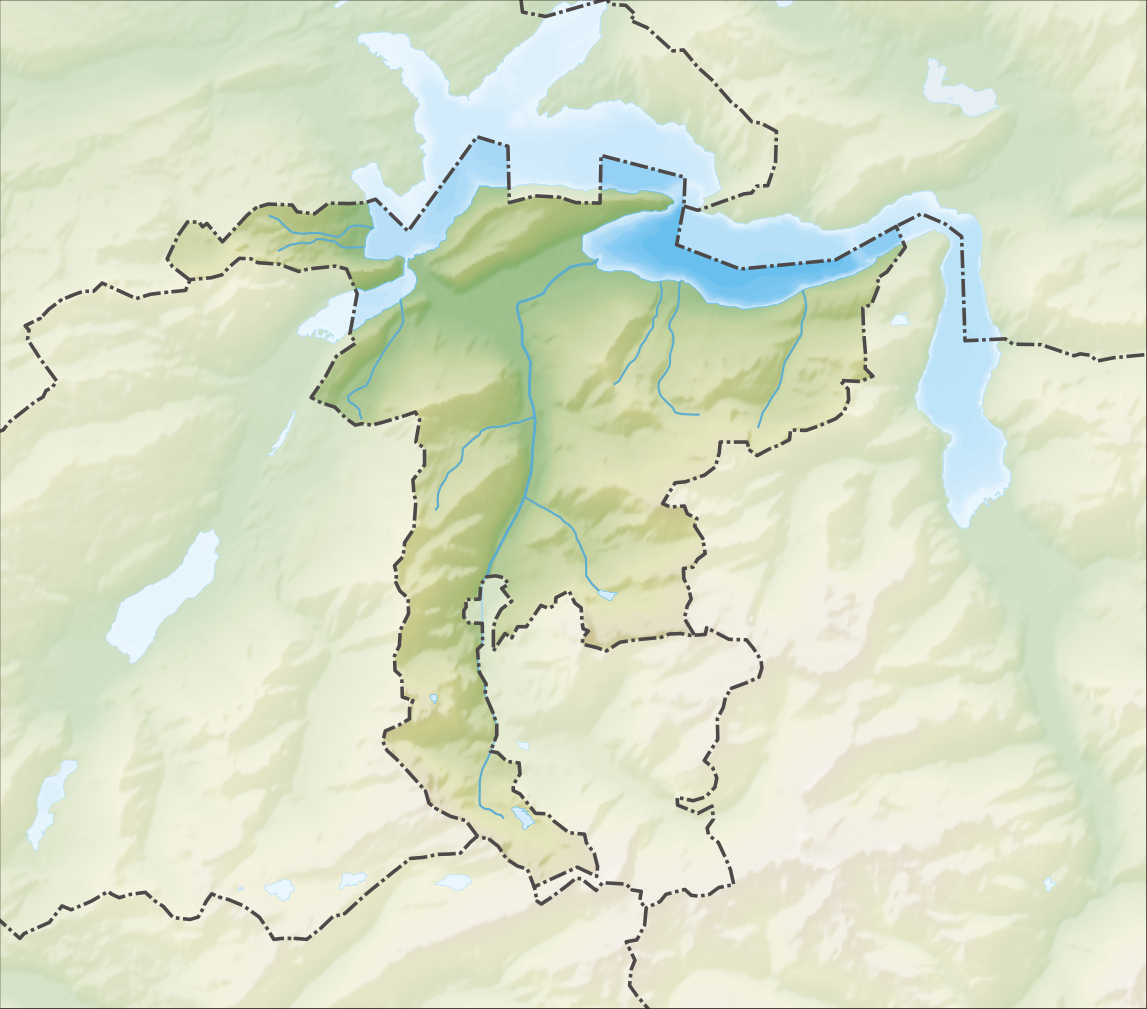
- Location within Switzerland Location within Canton of Nidwalden
- Coordinates: 46°58′N 8°28′E
- Country: Switzerland
- Canton: Nidwalden
- District: n.a.

Area
  - Total: 32.95 km^{2} (12.72 sq mi)
- Elevation: 435 m (1,427 ft)

Population (Dec 2016)
  - Total: 3,567
  - Density: 108.3/km^{2} (280.4/sq mi)
- Time zone: UTC+01:00 (CET)
  - Summer (DST): UTC+02:00 (CEST)
- Postal code: 6375
- SFOS number: 1501
- ISO 3166 code: CH-NW
- Surrounded by: Buochs, Emmetten, Ennetbürgen, Gersau (SZ), Isenthal (UR), Oberdorf, Wolfenschiessen
- Website: www.beckenried.ch

Beckenried is a municipality in the canton of Nidwalden in Switzerland.

== History ==
The first settlers in what would become Beckried were from Alamanni tribes that moved into the area over 2000 years ago. During the Middle Ages the region was part of extensive estates that were shared between Engelberg Abbey, Murbach-Lucerne and Steinen, Switzerland. The two tower houses in the village (named: Retschrieden and Isenringen) were built in the 13th century for two local, influential families. In 1262 the village is mentioned in an agreement over a nearby pasture. In 1314 it is mentioned as Beggenriet.

== Geography ==
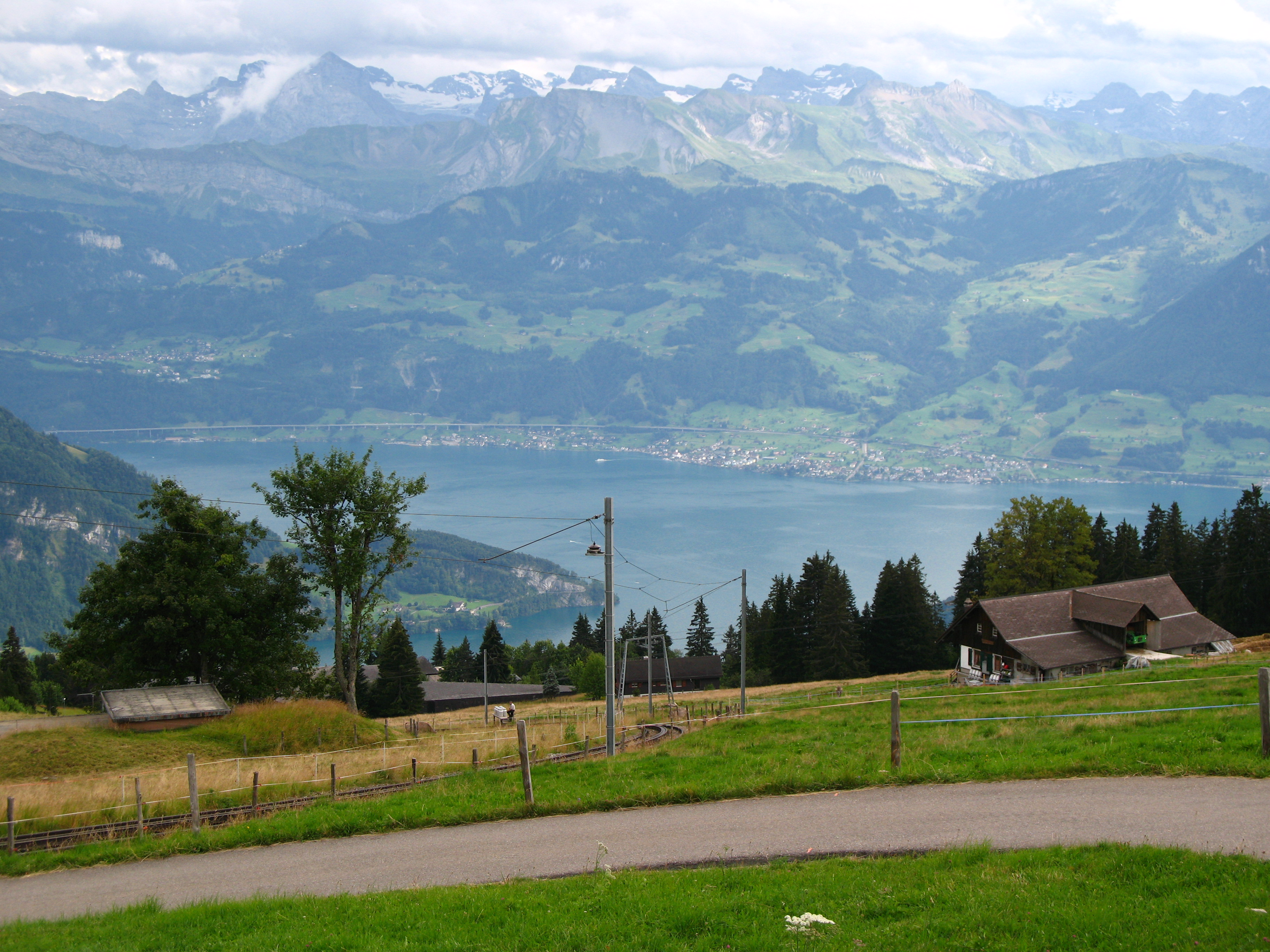
Beckenried from across the lake

Aerial view (1956)

Beckenried has an area, (as of the 2004/09 survey) of 24.23 km^{2} (9.36 sq mi). Of this area, about 48.7% is used for agricultural purposes, while 37.3% is forested. Of the rest of the land, 6.1% is settled (buildings or roads) and 7.9% is unproductive land. In the 2004/09 survey a total of 78 ha (190 acres) or about 3.2% of the total area was covered with buildings, an increase of 25 ha (62 acres) over the 1981 amount. Of the agricultural land, 6 ha (15 acres) is used for orchards and vineyards, 432 ha (1,070 acres) is fields and grasslands and 841 ha (2,080 acres) consists of alpine grazing areas. Since 1981 the amount of agricultural land has decreased by 30 ha (74 acres) and the amount of forested land has increased by 21 ha (52 acres). Rivers and lakes cover 9 ha (22 acres) in the municipality.

The municipality is a linear village along the shore of Lake Lucerne. It consists of the village of Beckenried with the sections known as Oberdorf, Niederdorf and Dorf.

The Beckenried–Gersau car ferry links a terminal in Niederdorf with Gersau on the opposite bank of Lake Lucerne.

== Demographics ==
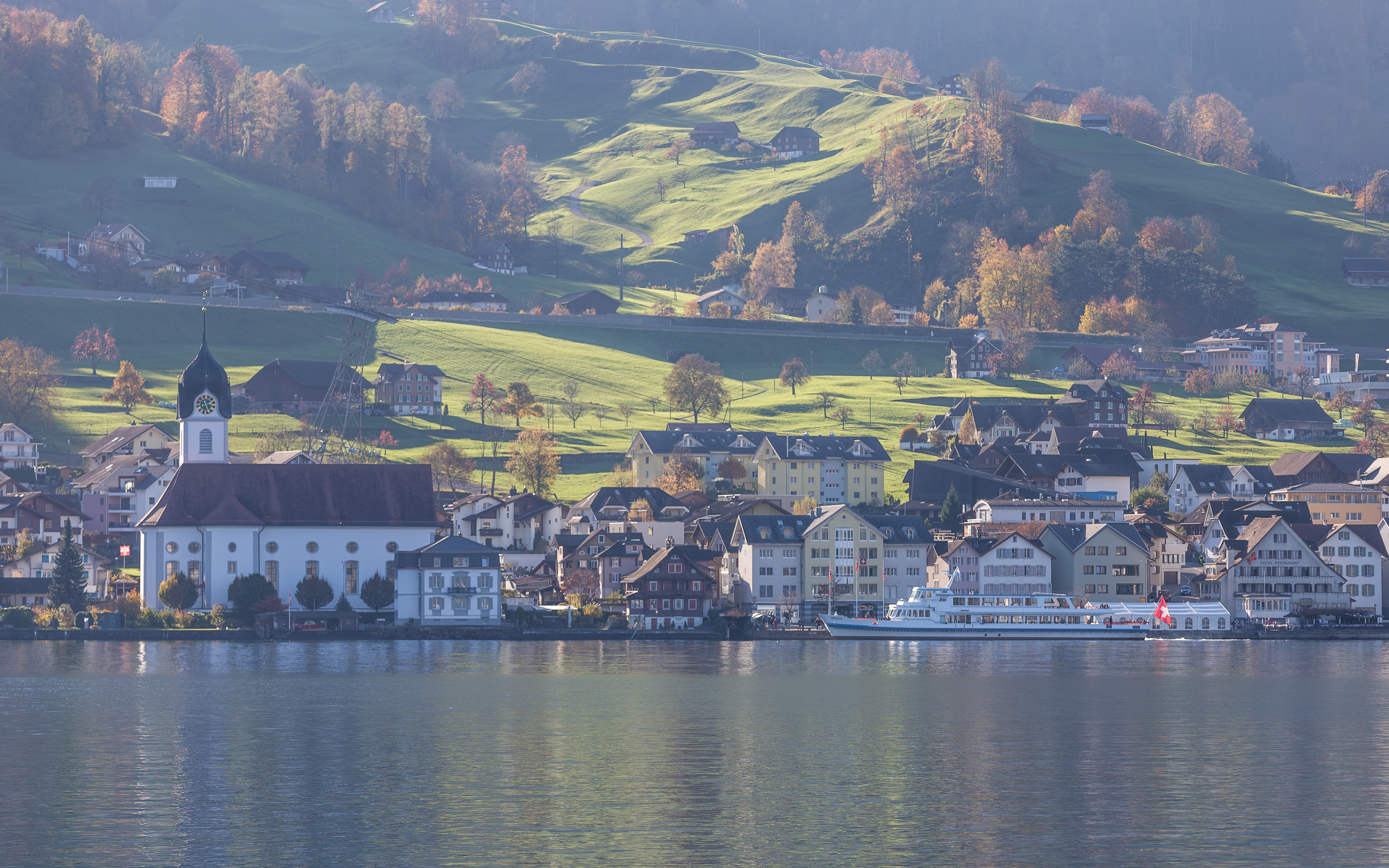
Beckenried waterfront in early November

Beckenried has a population (as of December 2020) of 3,742. As of 2015, 12.6% of the population are resident foreign nationals of which a small minority (182 or 5.1% of the total population) was born in Germany. Over the last 5 years (2010-2015) the population has changed at a rate of 6.88%. The birth rate in the municipality, in 2015, was 12.3, while the death rate was 6.3 per thousand residents.

As of 2015, children and teenagers (0–19 years old) make up 20.7% of the population, while adults (20–64 years old) are 61.7% of the population and seniors (over 64 years old) make up 17.6%. In 2015 there were 1,525 single residents, 1,582 people who were married or in a civil partnership, 173 widows or widowers and 264 divorced residents.

In 2015 there were 1,541 private households in Beckenried with an average household size of 2.27 persons. In 2015 about 34.8% of all buildings in the municipality were single family homes, which is about the same as the percentage in the canton (35.5%) and much less than the percentage nationally (57.4%). Of the 721 inhabited buildings in the municipality, in 2000, about 40.5% were single family homes and 39.3% were multiple family buildings. Additionally, about 27.5% of the buildings were built before 1919, while 14.3% were built between 1991 and 2000. In 2014 the rate of construction of new housing units per 1000 residents was 10.14. The vacancy rate for the municipality, in 2016, was 0.48%.

Most of the population (as of 2000) speaks German (95.3%), with English being second most common (1.0%) and Serbo-Croatian being third (0.8%).

The historical population is given in the following chart:

== Notable sights and recreation ==
The main sights of Beckenried are: the church St. Heinrich and its cemetery chapel, the Ridli chapel, the chapel St. Anna, the Klewen chapel, fun fair (Älplerkilbi), and the St. Nikolas market. The urban village of Beckenried and the hamlet of Ridli are both part of the Inventory of Swiss Heritage Sites.

Starting from Beckenried the longest cable car in central Switzerland brings tourists up to Klewenalp, a major holiday resort both in winter and in summer.

== Economy ==
Beckenried is classed as a suburban community. As of 2014, there were a total of 1,167 people employed in the municipality. Of these, a total of 158 people worked in 49 businesses in the primary economic sector. The secondary sector employed 258 workers in 42 separate businesses, of which 6 businesses employed a total of 147 employees. Finally, the tertiary sector provided 751 jobs in 174 businesses. In 2015 a total of 10.1% of the population received social assistance.

In 2011, the unemployment rate in the municipality was 0.6%.

In 2015 local hotels had a total of 27,293 overnight stays, of which 35.4% were international visitors. In 2015, there was one movie theater in the municipality with 198 seats.

In 2015 the average cantonal, municipal and church tax rate in the municipality for a couple with two children making SFr 80,000 was 3.2% while the rate for a single person making SFr 150,000 was 11.2%, both of which are close to the average for the canton. The canton has a slightly lower than average tax rate for those making SFr 80,000 and one of the lowest for those making SFr 150,000. In 2013, the average income in the municipality per tax payer was SFr 84,038 and the per person average was SFr 38,483, which is less than the cantonal average of SFr 98,342 and SFr 46,206 respectively In contrast, the national tax payer average is SFr 82,682, while the per person average is SFr 35,825.

== Politics ==
In the 2015 federal election the only major party which ran a candidate was the SVP which received 83.9% of the vote. In the federal election, a total of 1,492 votes were cast, and the voter turnout was 58.8%.

In the 2011 federal election the most popular party was the SVP with 48.1%, followed by the FDP with 34.1% and the GPS with 17.8%.

In the 2007 federal election the most popular party was the FDP which received 87.7% of the vote. The next three most popular parties were the local small left-wing parties (10.9%), a catch-all other category (1.4%) and the CVP (0.1%).

== Education ==
In Beckenried about 75.2% of the population (between age 25–64) have completed either non-mandatory upper secondary education or additional higher education (either university or a Fachhochschule).
