= Alois Wyrsch =

Swiss politician (1825–1888)

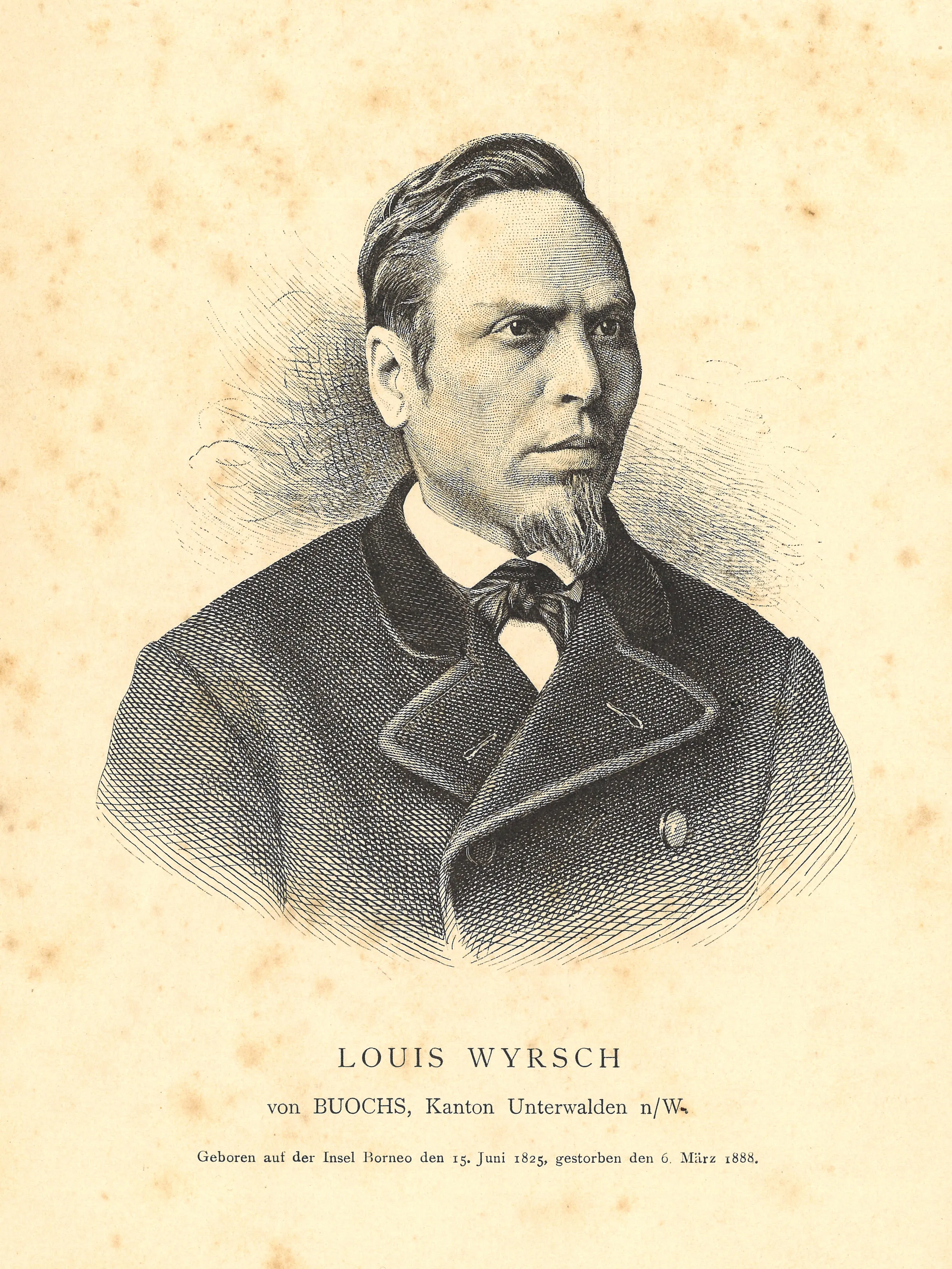

Member of the National Council of Switzerland
- In office 1860–1872
- Constituency: Canton of Nidwalden

Personal details
- Born: Alois Wyrsch; 15 June 1825 Borneo, Dutch East Indies
- Died: 6 March 1888 (aged 62) Buochs, Switzerland
- Spouses: Franziska Christen (m. 1845) Margareth Zelger (m. 1860)

Alois Wyrsch (15 June 1825 – 6 March 1888; also known as Louis Wyrsch) was a Swiss politician and a member of the National Council between 1860 and 1872. He was also a member and the president of the executive council in the canton of Nidwalden. Wyrsch was the first member of colour of the National Council.

== Early life and education ==
Alois Wyrsch was born on 15 June 1825 on the island of Borneo. His father, Louis Wyrsch, was a Swiss mercenary in the service of the Dutch East Indies in Banjarmasin, southern Borneo, while his mother, Johanna van den Berg, was a Javanese native. Johanna was called njai (maid in Malay) in his father's diaries. Wyrsch was given the name Alois like other male members of the family. He and his sister were both baptised in a Catholic church in Surabaya on Java. At the age of eight, he returned to Switzerland with his father and sister but without his mother, travelling from May to August 1832. His father had been wounded and had the right of a pension of a thousand Dutch guilders and earned the title of a Dutch knight of the House of Orange. His father sent Alois to learn Swiss German in Niederrickenbach, in the canton of Nidwalden. Later he attended high school at Engelberg Abbey and in Kreuzlingen. Following his graduation he trained as a miller in Buochs. At 20 years of age, Wyrsch married Franziska Christen. The marriage was not happy and the next year Alois attempted to return to the Dutch Indies. His father tried to enable this, contacting a friend in Utrecht and writing to the people he knew in the Dutch army, in which Alois should have been recruited as a sergeant and not a soldier. After a journey of nine months through Germany and the Netherlands he returned to Switzerland, where he fought with his father in the Sonderbund War in 1847.

== Professional and political career ==
Wyrsch took charge of a mill in Ennetbürgen in 1839, and in 1850 became the owner of another mill in Alpnach. In 1856 he was elected the commander of the Nidwaldean contingent of the Swiss Army by the troops. By then he called himself Louis Wyrsch, like his father. In 1865 he resigned from the mill business to focus on politics.

Wyrsch's role in the Swiss Army made him rather popular and he entered politics. He was first elected a member of the executive council of Nidwalden, then became President of the Executive Council and on 3 December 1860 he was elected to the National Council, becoming its first member of colour. In the 1860s he was also elected to the communal assembly of Buochs. As a liberal politician, he faced difficulties in a majority-Catholic conservative canton, and after he supported a new constitution in 1872 he was voted out of office.

Following this he repeatedly and unsuccessfully attempted to win election to the Council of States. Wyrsch's political career on the cantonal level remained successful, and he served as a member of the executive council of Nidwalden for twenty-seven years, including twelve as president.

== Personal life ==
Wyrsch married Franziska Christen, the daughter of a farmer, in 1845. His second marriage, in 1860, was to Margareth Zelger, the daughter of a hospital owner. He had two siblings from Borneo, and a half-brother Jakob from his father's second marriage. Wyrsch died on 6 March 1888 in Buochs.
