= Census in Switzerland =

The first Federal population census in Switzerland took place in March 1850 under the direction of Federal Councillor Stefano Franscini. As well as counting the number of inhabitants, respondents were also asked about their sex, age, marital status, occupation and religion. Between 1860 and 2000, a census took place every ten years in December. The only exceptions to this 10-year rhythm were the population census of 1888 (brought forward as the basis for the revision of the constituency boundaries) and the population census of 1941 (delayed due to the mobilisation of the army in May 1940). The census of 2000 was the last to use traditional methods. Since 2010, the population census has been carried out and analysed annually in a new format by the Federal Statistical Office (FSO). In order to ease the burden on the population, the information is primarily drawn from population registers and supplemented by sample surveys. Only a small proportion of the population (about 5%) are surveyed in writing or by telephone. The first reference day for the new census was 31 December 2010.

== The new census ==
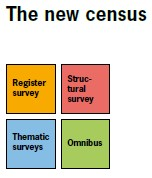
The new census

The new census is primarily based on a register survey that evaluates existing administrative data. To this end, the FSO uses cantonal and communal population registers, federal registers of persons and the Federal Register of Buildings and Dwellings.

Information that is not recorded in any register has to be collected by means of additional sample surveys (structural survey, thematic surveys, omnibus surveys).

=== Register survey ===
The Register survey provides basic information about the entire population. It furnishes results on the size and structure of the population and of households, as well as of residential buildings and dwellings. The results are available each year at the end of August (population statistics, buildings and dwellings statistics) or at the beginning of the year following the survey (household statistics, housing conditions).

=== Structural survey ===
Since 2010, for the Structural Survey 200,000 people (or 2.5 % of population) are surveyed in writing each year. Cantons and cities can enlarge the sample for their area. The survey provides additional statistical information (about language and religion) on the structure of the population and thus complements the information in the registers. Data are extrapolated to obtain statistical results for the whole population (aged 15 years and older). These are estimates subject to a certain degree of uncertainty. Facts that can affect the accuracy of these estimates are: the consistency of the variables recorded, the size and structure of the sample as well as the willingness of the persons interviewed to answer the questions (response rate). By merging or cumulating samples (pooling) from several years it is possible to get more accurate results than those obtained from one single sample.

=== Thematic surveys ===
For the thematic surveys, 10,000 or 40,000 people are surveyed each year on one of a total of five themes. The statistics from these surveys can be used to add considerable depth to the information from the structural survey. The first results are available one year after the collection of data from the respondents has been concluded.

=== Omnibus ===
Omnibus surveys are surveys on current topics in which 3000 persons are asked to provide quick answers to current questions of interest to policymakers and the scientific and research community. The results are available about six months after the survey.

== See also ==
- Demographics of Switzerland

== Footnotes and references ==
- Federal Statistical Office, The New Census, Neuchâtel 2011
