= Melchior Wyrsch =

Swiss painter

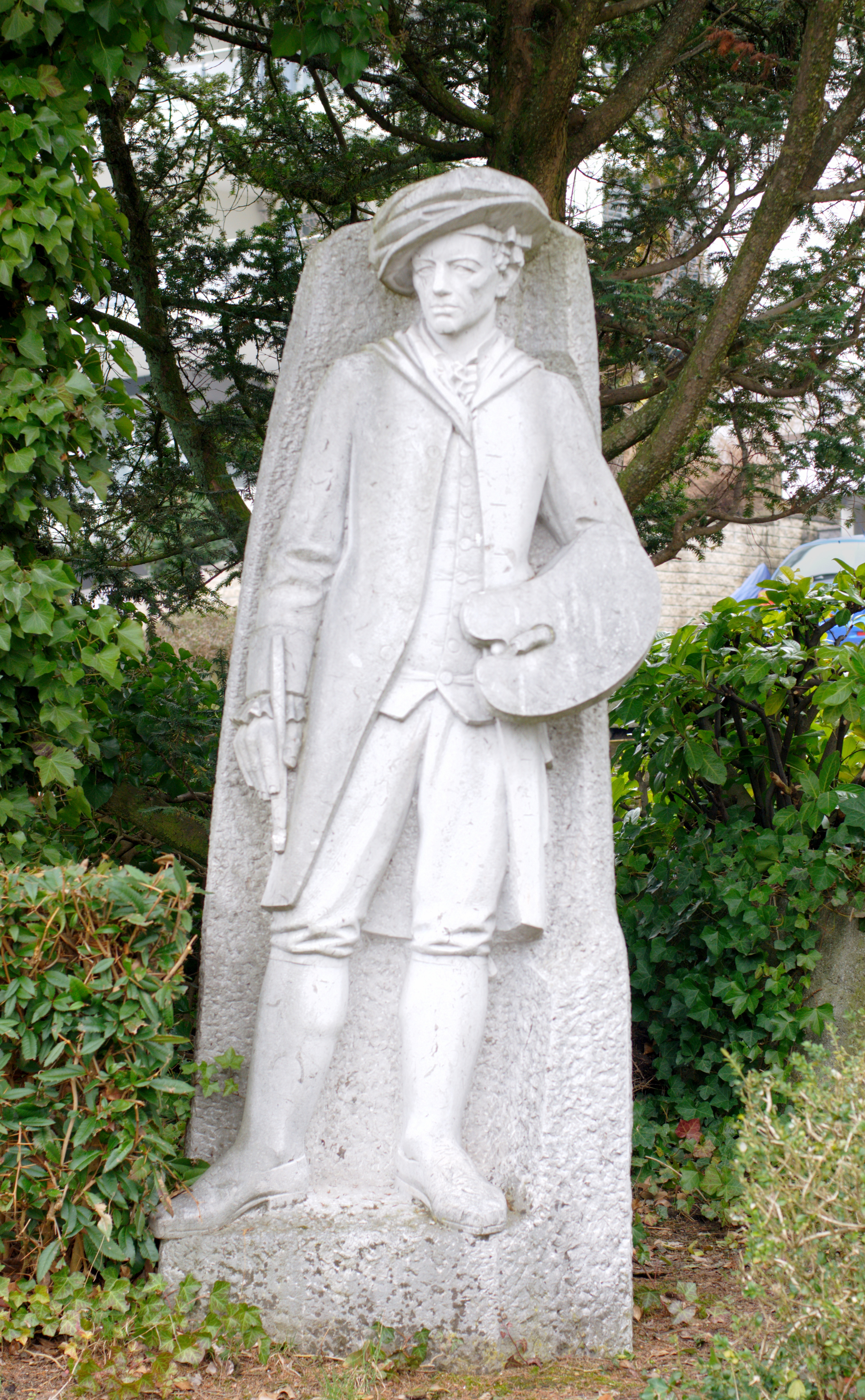
Statue of Melchior Wyrsch in Buochs by Luc Breton

Johann Melchior Wyrsch (21 August 1732 – 9 September 1798) was a Swiss painter of the 18th century.

== Life ==
Johann Melchior Wyrsch was born on 21 August 1732 in Buochs, Unterwalden. He was the son of Balthazar Francis Xavier, Councillor, bailiff and Diet envoy, and Anna Klara Achermann. Wyrsch began his art studies 1745 as a portrait painter with Johann Michael Suter in Lucerne and Franz Anton Kraus in Einsiedeln as teachers.

Between 1753 and 1754 he spent a study tour in Italy under Gaetano Lapis (1706-1773), where he mainly resided in Rome and Naples. After his art studies in Italy, he returned to Switzerland and began his artistic activity as a portrait and church painter. In 1768 he moved to Besançon, where he painted many portraits of respected people.

Together with the sculptor Luc Breton, whom he had met in Rome, he founded in 1773 the academy for painting and drawing École régionale des beaux-arts de Besançon ( Académie de Peinture et de dessin ) in Besançon.

In 1877 he traveled to Paris, and returned to Besançon, where he was appointed in 1784 an honorary citizen. In the same year he moved to Lucerne, where he proposed to the Council of Lucerne in 1783 to found a School of Drawing with the task to teach talented young students in drawing and modeling.

With an increasing blindness ascribed to cataracts, he withdrew to Buochs, where at the Conquest Nidwalden he was murdered by the troops of Napoleon Bonaparte.

== Legacy ==
In the transition from Baroque and rococo on the one hand to Classical and Romanticism on the other hand Wyrsch participated in the development of portraits for differentiated characterization of a single individual.

He was enshrined in the "enlightened paternalism" of the Old Confederation, however, his work has been on the liberal bourgeois era.

He painted as a religious painter numerous altars in Central Switzerland and the Franche-Comté that are still adorned with his paintings.

He remained a central Swiss painter of the late Baroque.

In 1780 the abbot of Disentis, Columban Sozzi, paid attention to the talent of Felix Maria Diogg (1762–1834), and enabled him to travel to Wyrsch in Besançon.

== Literature ==
- Matthias Vogel, Regine Helbling, Marianne Baltensperger (Eds.): Powdered and cleaned. Johann Melchior Wyrsch 1732–1798. Portraitist and church painter , Schwabe, 1998. ISBN 379651085X
- Dr. Paul Fischer: The painter Johann Melchior Wyrsch of Buochs, 1732 - 1798 | His Life and Work, commission publishing, bookstore C. Bachmann, Zurich 1938
- Johann Kaspar Fuessli: History of the best artists in Switzerland Johann Melchior Joseph Würsch (page 102-109), Orell, Gessner, Füsslin and Comp, Zurich, 1779
- Wyrsch, Johann (Jean) Melchior Joseph (Josef), Swiss Institute for Art Research, Hans-Peter Wittwer
