= Ennetbürgen =

- Municipality
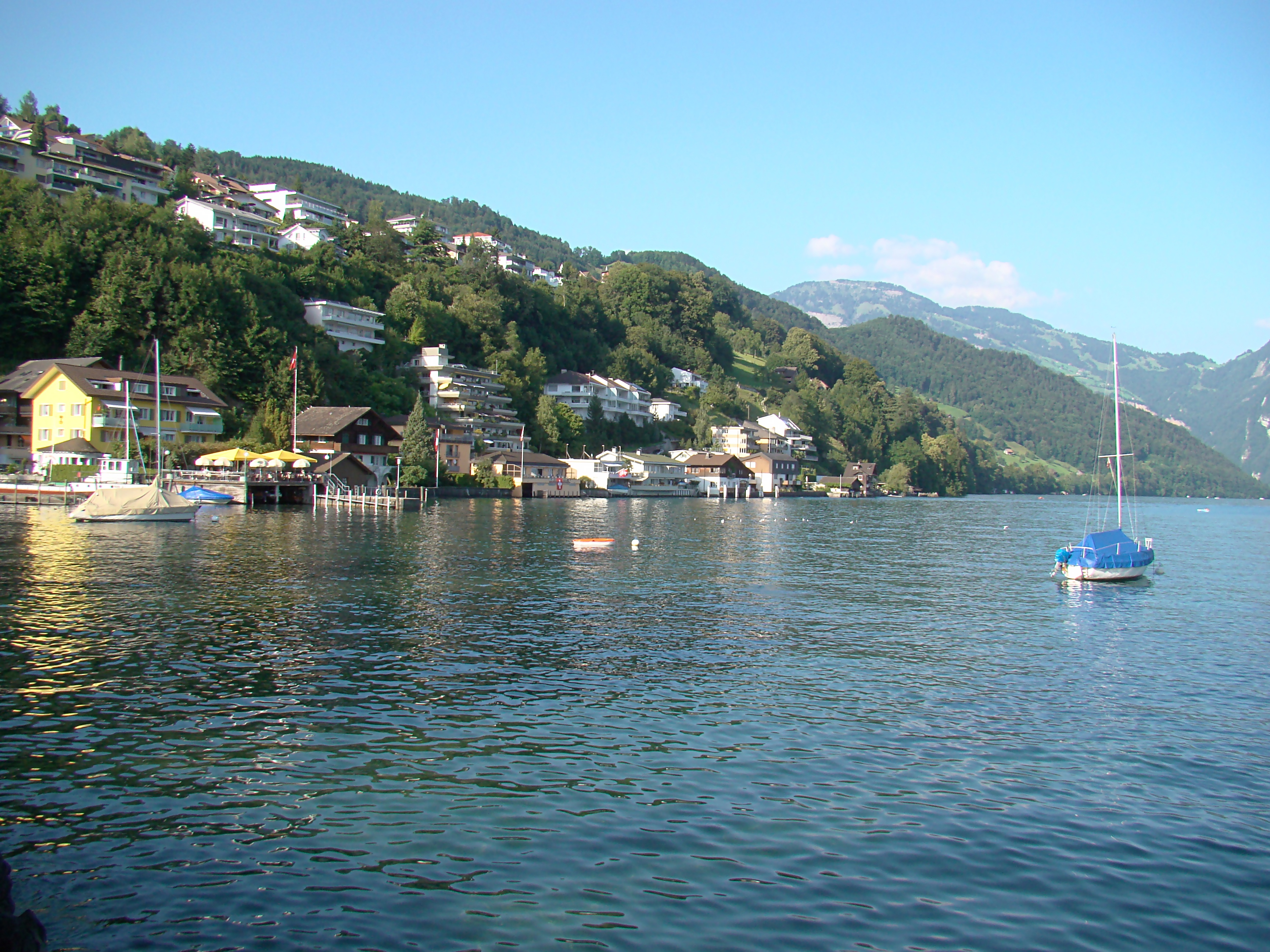

- Flag Coat of arms
- Location of Ennetbürgen
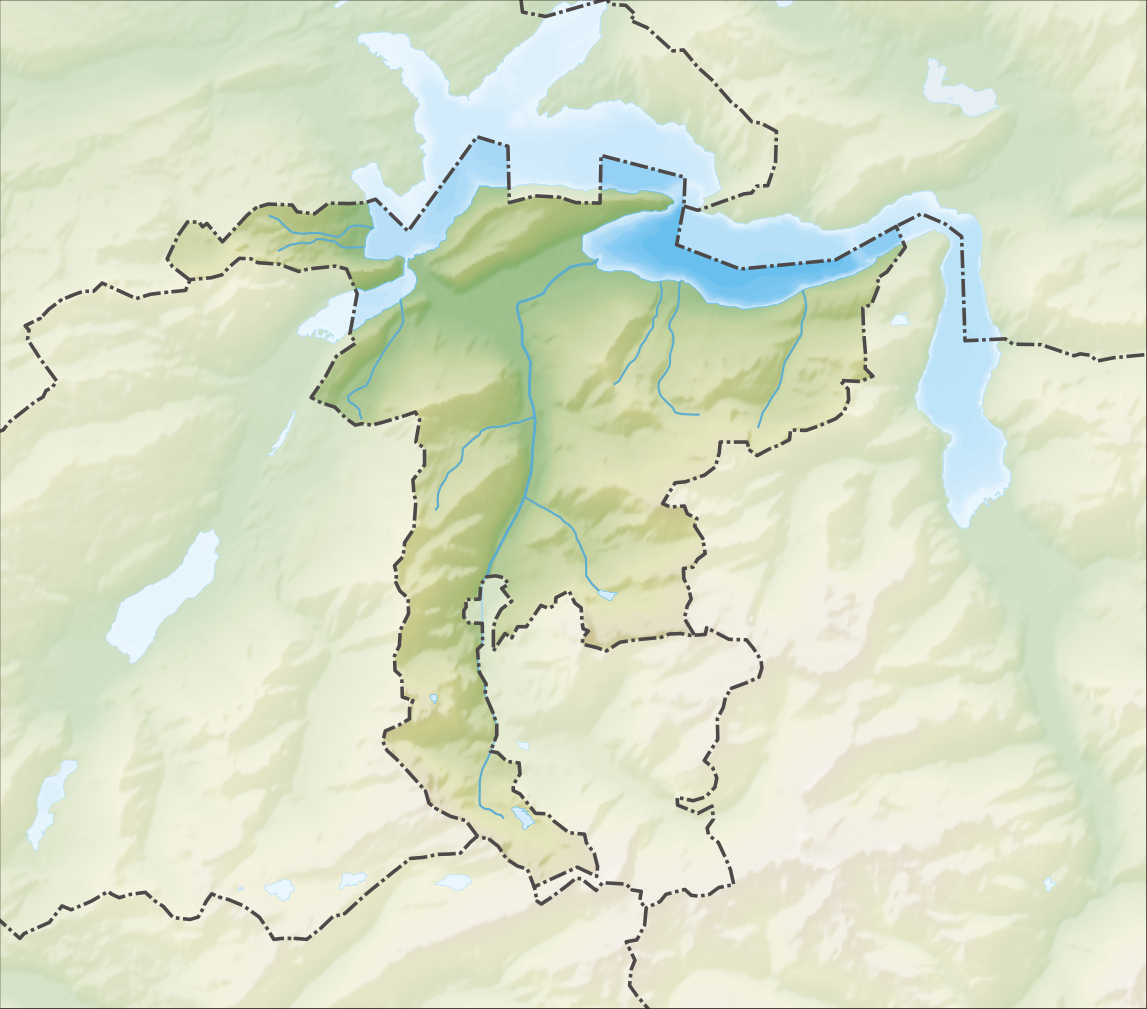
- Location within Switzerland Location within Canton of Nidwalden
- Coordinates: 46°59′N 8°25′E
- Country: Switzerland
- Canton: Nidwalden
- District: n.a.

Area
  - Total: 17.70 km^{2} (6.83 sq mi)
- Elevation: 435 m (1,427 ft)

Population (December 2020)
  - Total: 4,866
  - Density: 274.9/km^{2} (712.0/sq mi)
- Time zone: UTC+01:00 (CET)
  - Summer (DST): UTC+02:00 (CEST)
- Postal code: 6373
- SFOS number: 1505
- ISO 3166 code: CH-NW
- Surrounded by: Beckenried, Buochs, Gersau (SZ), Lucerne (LU) Stans, Stansstad, Vitznau (LU), Weggis (LU)
- Website: www.ennetbuergen.ch

Ennetbürgen is a municipality in the canton of Nidwalden in Switzerland.

== History ==
Aerial view (1956)

Ennetbürgen is first mentioned by 1190 as Burgin. In 1799, it became Enet-Bürgen and in 1836, Ennerbürgen. Since 1850, the official name has been Ennetbürgen.

== Geography ==
Ennetbürgen has an area, as of 2006, of 9.4 square kilometers (3.6 sq mi). Of this area, 51.7% is used for agricultural purposes, while 33.5% is forested. Of the rest of the land, 14.7% is settled (buildings or roads) and the remainder (0.1%) is non-productive (rivers, glaciers or mountains).

The municipality is located between Lake Lucerne and the foot of the Bürgenberg mountain.

== Demographics ==
Ennetbürgen has a population (as of 31 December 2020) of 4,866. As of 2007, 10.3% of the population was made up of foreign nationals. Over the last 10 years the population has grown at a rate of 8%. Most of the population (as of 2000) speaks German (94.2%), with Serbo-Croatian being second most common ( 1.2%) and Italian being third ( 0.9%). As of 2008, the gender distribution of the population was 51.4% male and 48.6% female.

As of 2000, there are 1,583 households, of which 994 households (or about 62.8%) contain only one or two individuals. 131 or about 8.3% are large households, with at least five members.

In the 2007 federal election, the most popular party was the FDP which received 88.2% of the vote. Most of the rest of votes went to local small right-wing parties (9.8%).

The entire Swiss population is generally well educated. In Ennetbürgen, about 75% of the population (between age 25–64) have completed either non-mandatory upper secondary education or additional higher education (either university or a Fachhochschule).

Ennetbürgen has an unemployment rate of 1.12%. As of 2005, there were 122 people employed in the primary economic sector and about 52 businesses involved in this sector. 318 people are employed in the secondary sector and there are 43 businesses in this sector. 718 people are employed in the tertiary sector, with 123 businesses in this sector.

The historical population is given in the following table:

year	population
1850	880
1870	972
1880	898
1900	923
1950	1,446
1960	1,917
1970	2,350
1980	2,716
1990	3,529
2000	3,976
2005	4,198

== Sights ==
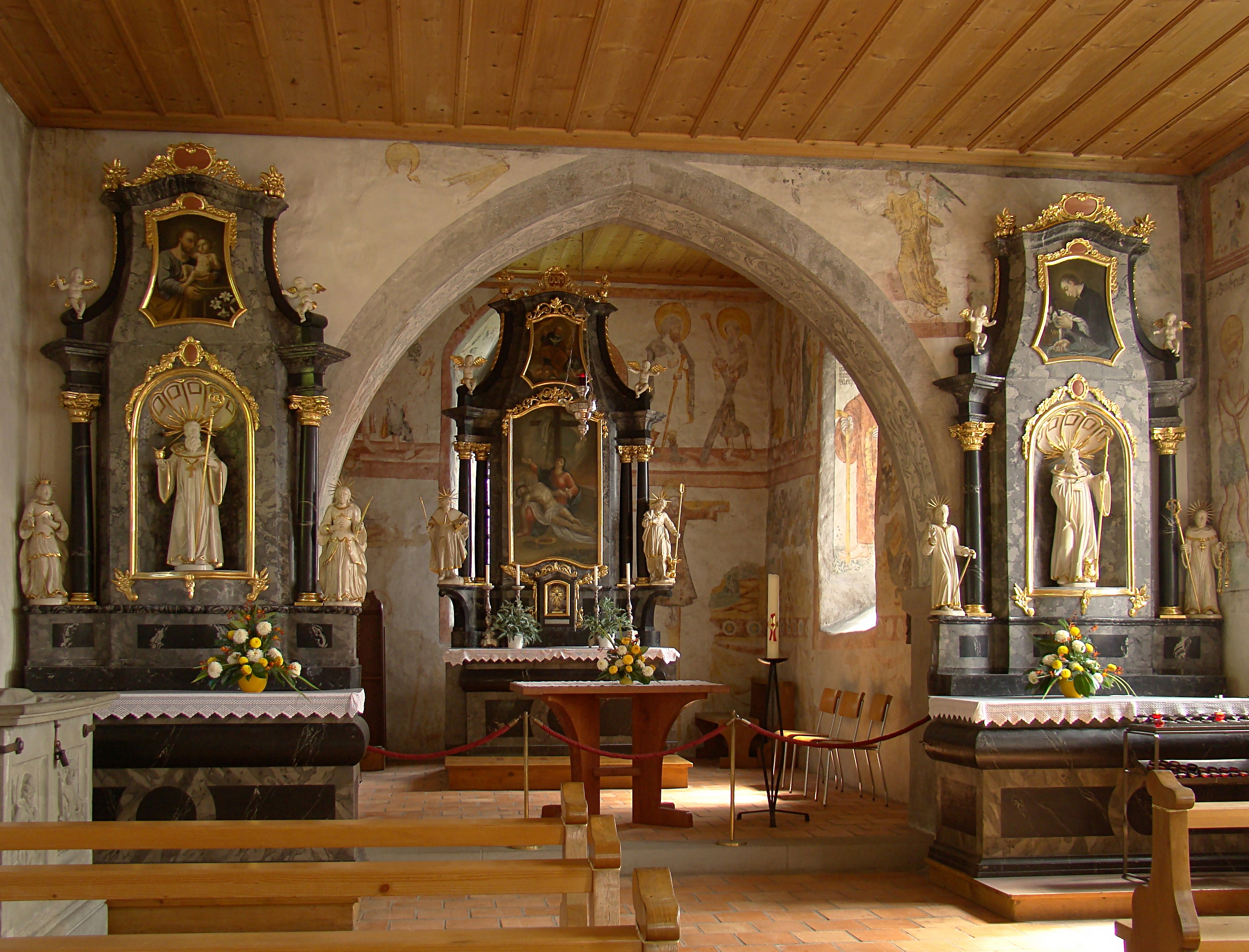
Chapel of St. Jost

The main sights of Ennetbürgen are: the chapel St. Jost, and the clergy house St. Jost.
