= Buochs =

- Municipality
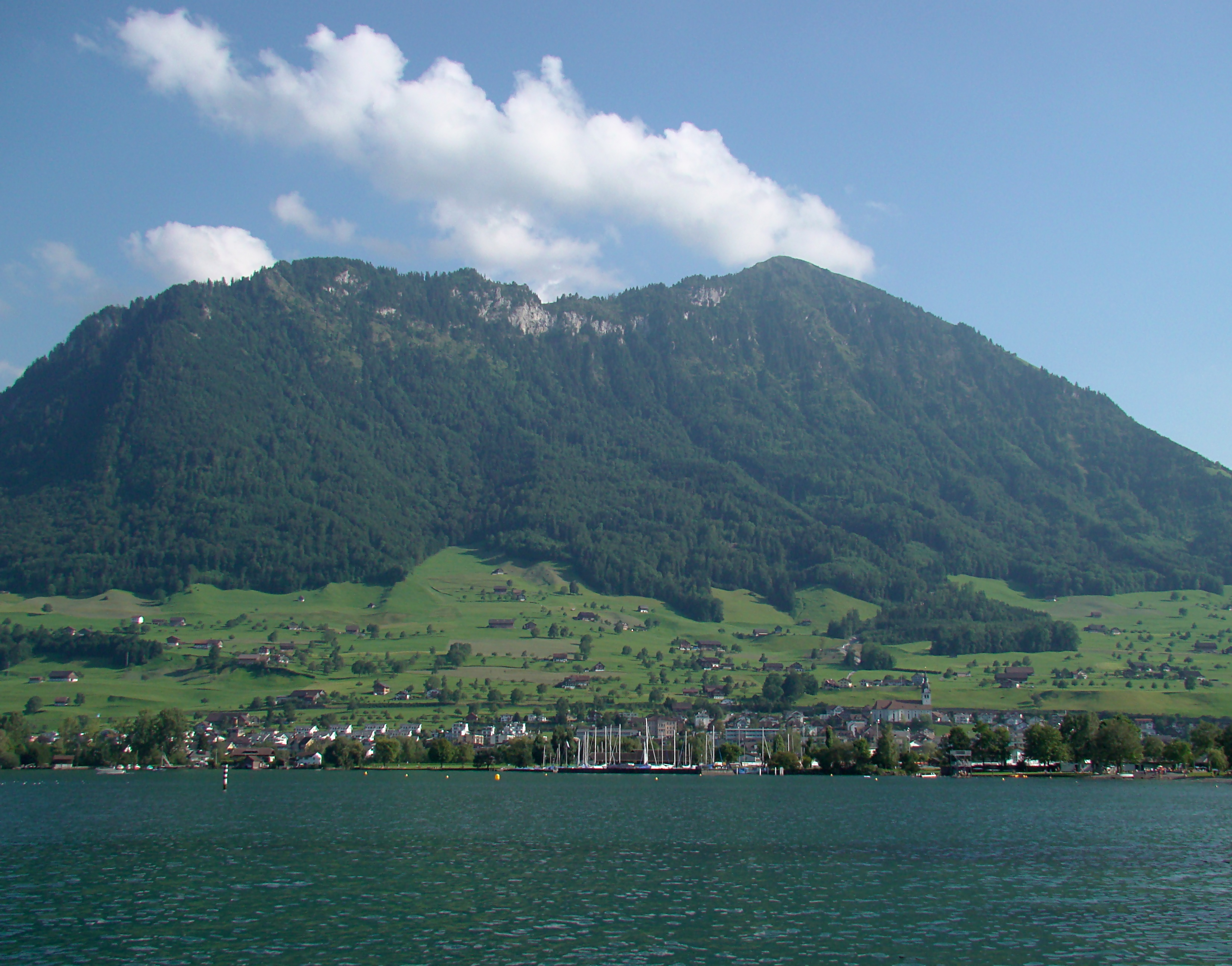

- Flag Coat of arms
- Location of Buochs
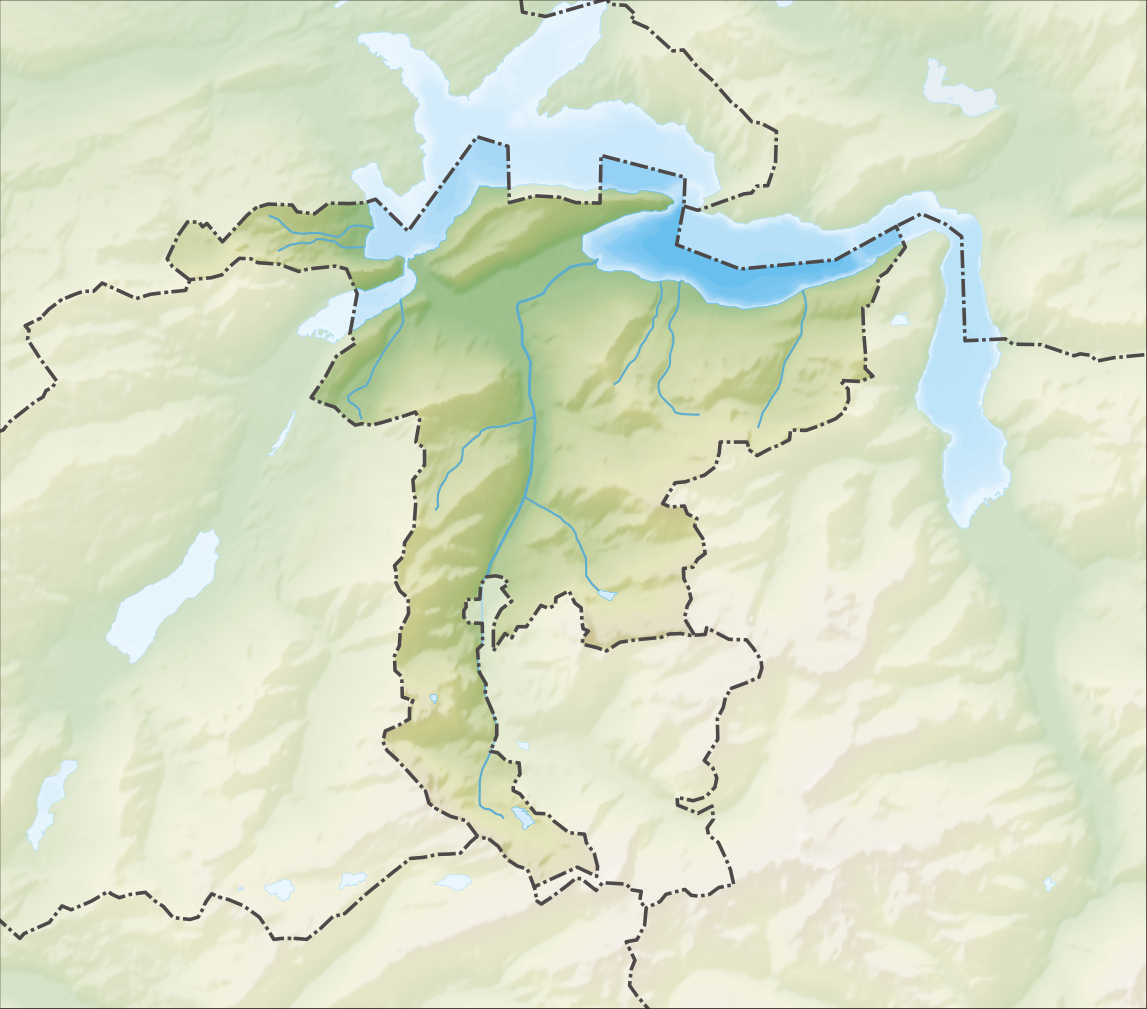
- Location within Switzerland Location within Canton of Nidwalden
- Coordinates: 46°58′N 8°25′E
- Country: Switzerland
- Canton: Nidwalden
- District: n.a.

Area
  - Total: 9.9 km^{2} (3.8 sq mi)
- Elevation: 435 m (1,427 ft)

Population (December 2020)
  - Total: 5,313
  - Density: 540/km^{2} (1,400/sq mi)
- Time zone: UTC+01:00 (CET)
  - Summer (DST): UTC+02:00 (CEST)
- Postal code: 6374
- SFOS number: 1502
- ISO 3166 code: CH-NW
- Surrounded by: Beckenried, Ennetbürgen, Gersau (SZ), Oberdorf, Stans
- Twin towns: Deidesheim (Germany)
- Website: www.buochs.ch

Buochs is a municipality in the canton of Nidwalden in Switzerland.

== History ==
Buochs is first mentioned in 1124 as Boches. In 1184, it was mentioned as Buoches, then in 1210 as Buches, and in 1229 as Buchs.

== Geography ==
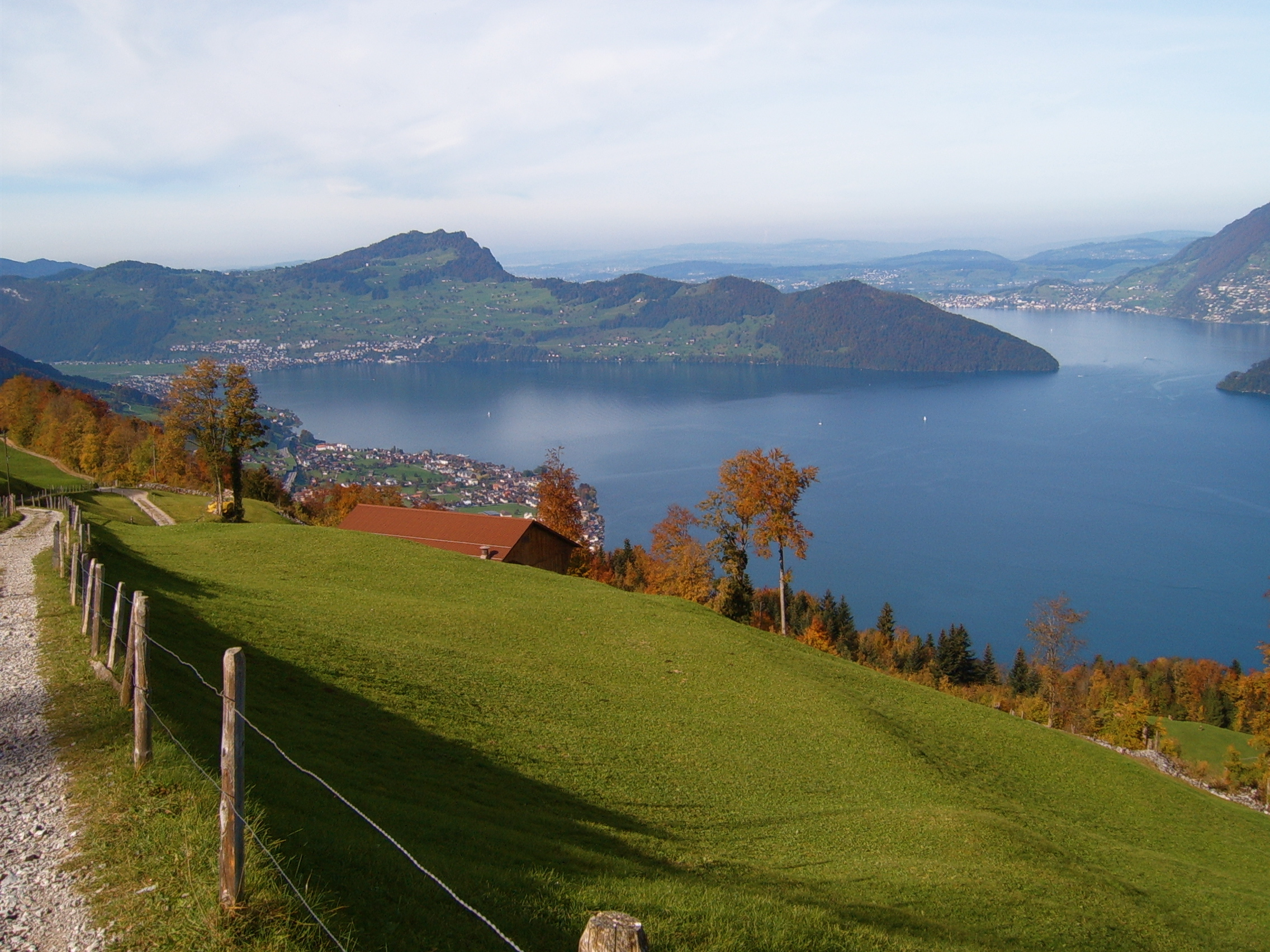
Gulf of Buochs on Lake Lucerne

Aerial view from 400 m by Walter Mittelholzer (1925)

Buochs has an area, (as of the 2004/09 survey) of 9.96 km^{2} (3.85 sq mi). Of this area, about 46.8% is used for agricultural purposes, while 33.5% is forested. Of the rest of the land, 18.0% is settled (buildings or roads) and 1.7% is unproductive land. In the 2004/09 survey a total of 96 ha (240 acres) or about 9.7% of the total area was covered with buildings, an increase of 32 ha (79 acres) over the 1981 amount. Of the agricultural land, 19 ha (47 acres) is used for orchards and vineyards, 448 ha (1,110 acres) is fields and grasslands and 1 ha (2.5 acres) consists of alpine grazing areas. Since 1981 the amount of agricultural land has decreased by 28 ha (69 acres). Over the same time period the amount of forested land has decreased by 2 ha (4.9 acres). Rivers and lakes cover 16 ha (40 acres) in the municipality.

The municipality is located along the roads between Ennetbürgen, Beckenried and Stans. It is on the western side of Lake Lucerne between the Engelberger Aa and the Buochserhorn mountain. It consists of the former linear village of Buochs.

== Demographics ==
Buochs has a population (as of December 2020) of 5,313. As of 2015, 15.4% of the population are resident foreign nationals. Over the last 5 years (2010–2015) the population has changed at a rate of 2.16%. The birth rate in the municipality, in 2015, was 11.6, while the death rate was 6.1 per thousand residents.

As of 2015, children and teenagers (0–19 years old) make up 19.5% of the population, while adults (20–64 years old) are 63.4% of the population and seniors (over 64 years old) make up 17.0%. In 2015 there were 2,405 single residents, 2,465 people who were married or in a civil partnership, 217 widows or widowers and 346 divorced residents.

In 2015 there were 2,244 private households in Buochs with an average household size of 2.39 persons. In 2015 about 28.6% of all buildings in the municipality were single family homes, which is less than the percentage in the canton (35.5%) and much less than the percentage nationally (57.4%). Of the 742 inhabited buildings in the municipality, in 2000, about 29.5% were single family homes and 50.3% were multiple family buildings. Additionally, about 18.2% of the buildings were built before 1919, while 14.7% were built between 1991 and 2000. In 2014 the rate of construction of new housing units per 1000 residents was 16.67. The vacancy rate for the municipality, in 2016, was 1.21%.

Most of the population (as of 2000) speaks German (90.9%), with Italian being second most common (1.8%) and Croatian being third (1.7%). As of 2008 the gender distribution of the population was 50.8% male and 49.2% female.

The historical population is given in the following chart:

== Sights ==
The main sights of Buochs are the church St. Martin, the Loreto chapel in Ennerberg, a monument of Johann Melchior Wyrsch, and the quay.

The urban village of Buochs is part of the Inventory of Swiss Heritage Sites.

== Politics ==
In the 2015 federal election the only major party which ran a candidate was the SVP which received 83.8% of the vote. In the federal election, a total of 2,242 votes were cast, and the voter turnout was 57.3%. In the 2011 election the SVP received 43.8%, followed by the FDP with 38.0% and the GPS with 18.2%.

In the 2007 federal election, the most popular party was the FDP which received 89.9% of the vote. Most of the rest of the votes went to local small right-wing parties (9.4%).

== Education ==
In Buochs about 73% of the population (between age 25–64) have completed either non-mandatory upper secondary education or additional higher education (either university or a Fachhochschule).

== Economy ==
Buochs is classified as a suburban community.

As of 2014, there were a total of 1,971 people employed in the municipality. Of these, a total of 130 people worked in 44 businesses in the primary economic sector. The secondary sector employed 599 workers in 81 separate businesses, of which there were 12 small businesses with a total of 336 employees and larger business with a total of 60 employees. Finally, the tertiary sector provided 1,242 jobs in 240 businesses, of which three mid sized businesses employed a total of 246 employees.

In 2015 a total of 16.7% of the population received social assistance. In 2011 the unemployment rate in the municipality was 1%.

In 2015 local hotels had a total of 35,351 overnight stays, of which 90.8% were international visitors.

In 2015 the average cantonal, municipal and church tax rate in the municipality for a couple with two children making SFr 80,000 was 3.3% while the rate for a single person making SFr 150,000 was 11.6%, both of which are close to the average for the canton. The canton has a slightly lower than average tax rate for those making SFr 80,000 and one of the lowest for those making SFr 150,000. In 2013 the average income in the municipality per tax payer was SFr 76,843 and the per person average was SFr 35,038, which is less than the cantonal average of SFr 98,342 and SFr 46,206 respectively It is also less than the national per tax payer average of SFr 82,682 and the per person average of SFr 35,825.

== Sports ==
The village is home to the football club SC Buochs, who play in the 2. Liga Interregional.

From 15 to 19 July 2009, the ICF Junior Wildwater Worldchampionships took place. It was mainly organized by members of the canoeclub of Nidwalden and the canoeclub of Obwalden. The races were on the Engelberger Aa.
