= Canton of Schwyz =

Canton of Switzerland

Canton of Schwyz Kanton Schwyz (German)
- Canton
- Flag Coat of arms Brandmark
- Interactive map of Canton of Schwyz
- Coordinates: 47°4′N 8°45′E
- Capital: Schwyz
- Largest city: Freienbach
- Subdivisions: 30 municipalities, 6 districts

Government
  - President: André Rüegsegger
  - Executive: Regierungsrat (7)
  - Legislative: Kantonsrat (100)

Area
  - Total: 907.89 km^{2} (350.54 sq mi)

Population (December 2020)
  - Total: 162,157
  - Density: 178.61/km^{2} (462.59/sq mi)

GDP
  - Total: CHF 9.876 billion (2020)
  - Per capita: CHF 61,223 (2020)
- ISO 3166 code: CH-SZ
- Highest point: 2,802 m (9,193 ft): Bös Fulen
- Lowest point: 406 m (1,332 ft): Lake Zürich
- Joined: 1291
- Languages: German
- Website: www.sz.ch

The canton of Schwyz is a canton in central Switzerland between the Alps in the south, Lake Lucerne to the west and Lake Zürich in the north, centred on and named after the town of Schwyz.

It is one of the founding cantons of Switzerland; Switzerland's name is derived from the name of the canton, and the flag of Switzerland from its coat of arms. For the history of the name, see Schwyz. The Swiss Federal Charter is on display in Schwyz. Northeast of the town of Schwyz is Einsiedeln Abbey.

== History ==
=== Prehistory to the Roman era ===
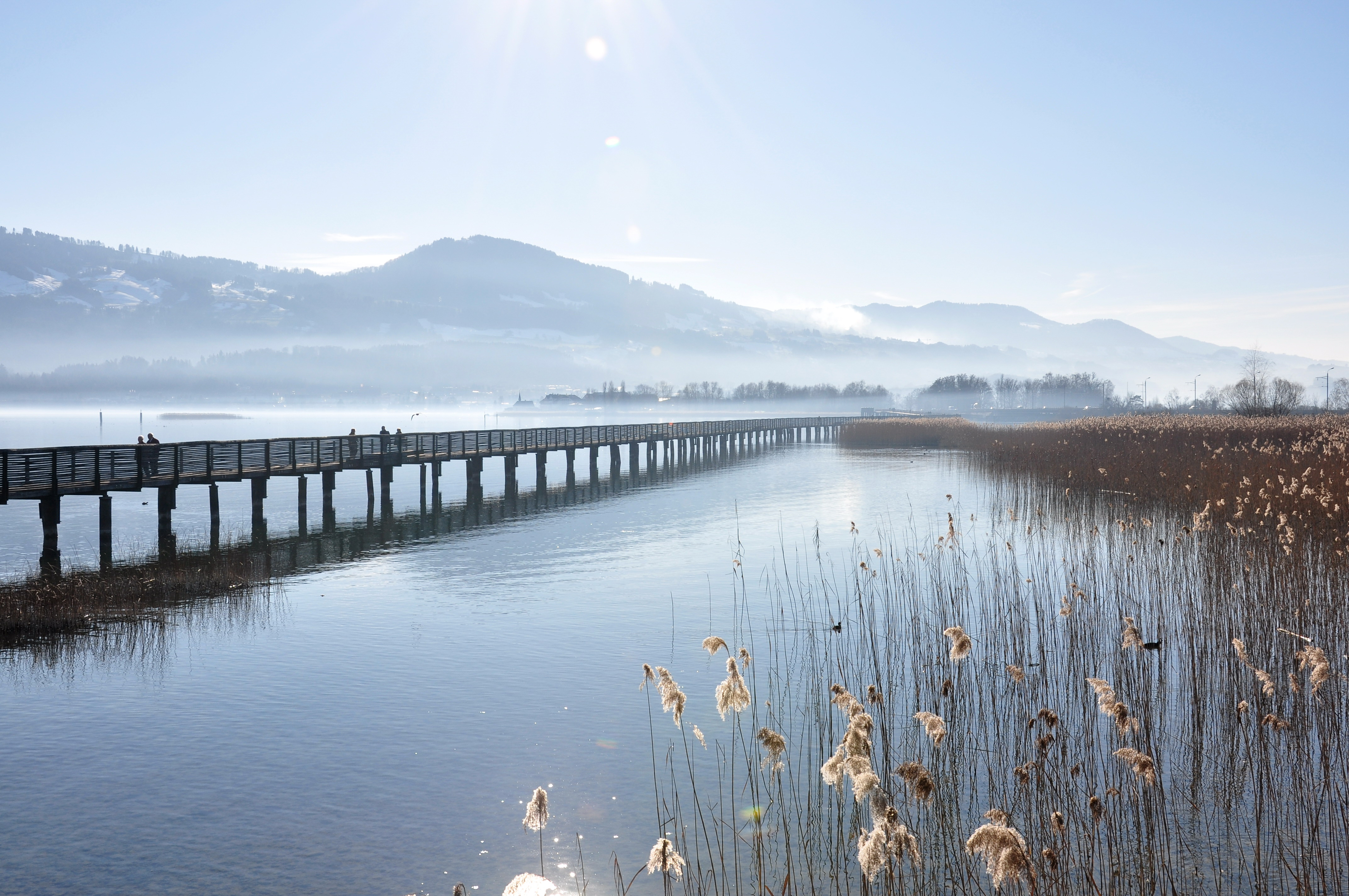
Modern wooden bridge on Obersee between Rapperswil and Hurden, near the site of the ancient bridges

The earliest traces of humans in Schwyz are from the Upper Paleolithic and Early Mesolithic, or about 12,500 BC. An excavation of the karst caves in the valley of the Muota river (Muotatal) revealed numerous sites, some dating to the Younger Dryas period (c. 10,000 BC). The alpine meadows at Bödmeren, Twärenen and Silberen were Stone Age hunter-gatherer camps. Ibex and red deer bones, along with charcoal, indicate that the animals were butchered and cooked in these camps. In 2009 the first Stone Age tool in the canton, a stone drill, was discovered.

During the late Neolithic and early Bronze Age, a number of pile dwellings and other settlements developed around the lakes of the canton. The two settlements at Hurden in Freienbach are part of the Prehistoric Pile dwellings around the Alps, a UNESCO World Heritage Site. The Hurden sites are related to the western Cortaillod culture (c. 4500–3500 BC). Sites on the island of Lützelau and the shore zone at Freienbach are eastern Pfyn culture (4000–3300 BC) and Corded Ware culture (2750–2450 BC). During the Bronze Age, several bridges were built between the promontory of Endingen in Rapperswil, St. Gallen and the settlements at Hurden. Over 200,000 posts and seven bridges have been discovered, along with several settlements and ritual sites. On the Schwyz side of the lake, ten different settlements from 4300–2700 BC have been discovered.

However, after 1200 BC there is very little evidence for further Bronze Age settlements in the canton. Only eight Iron Age sites have been discovered in the canton from the 8th to 1st centuries BC. During the Roman era, a Roman Vicus was established at Kempraten in Rapperswil, around the massive bridge at Seedamm (near the Bronze Age bridges) which crossed into Schwyz. A Gallo-Roman temple was built on Ufenau island around AD 200. This site was redeveloped for the present chapel of Sts. Peter and Paul. A few Roman coin hoards were discovered at Küssnacht and Rickenbach bei Schwyz, and Küssnacht may have been the site of a Roman estate.

=== Early Middle Ages ===
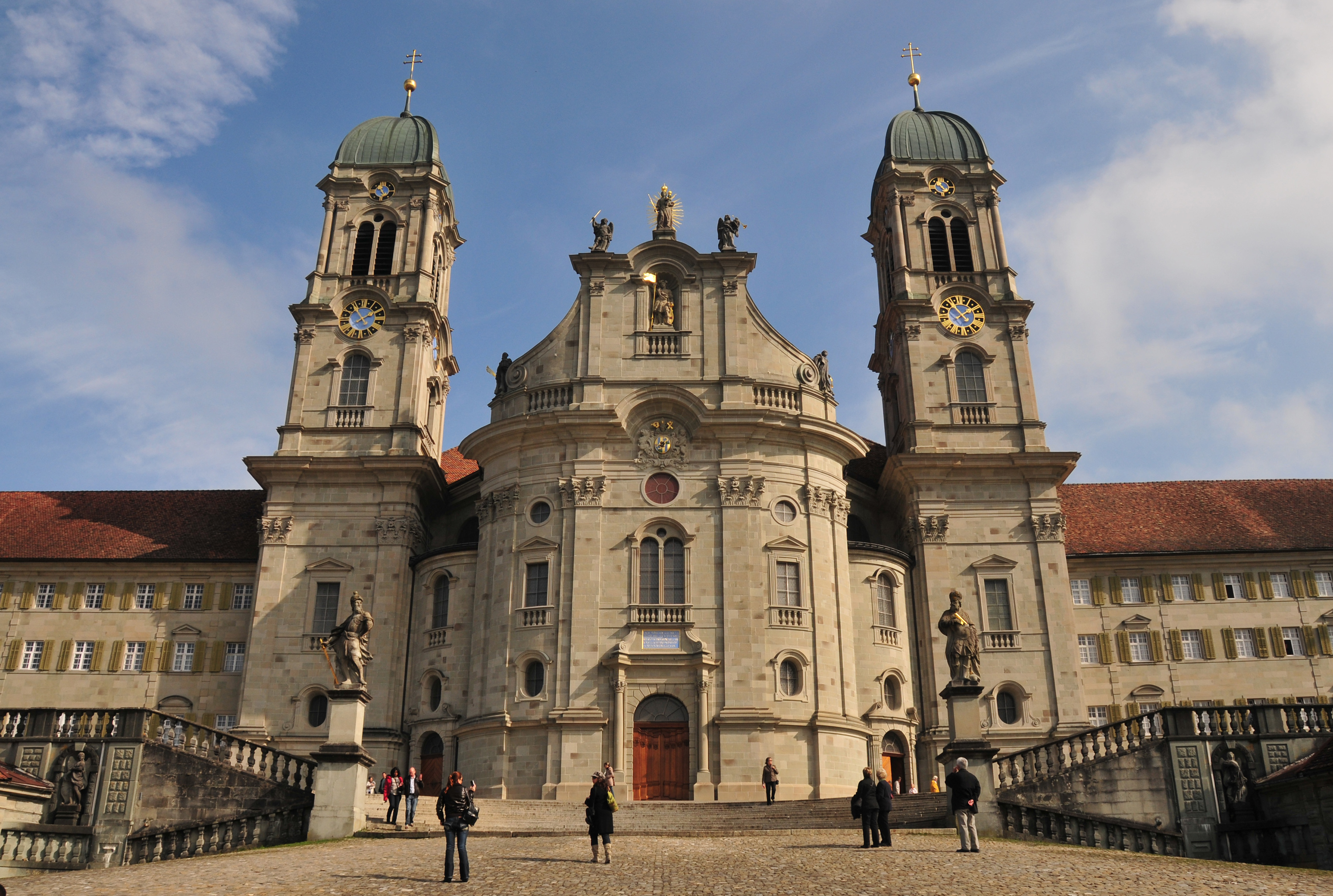
The Abbey of Einsiedeln and Schwyz town were two of the major powers in Schwyz.

In 561, Schwyz became part of the Ducatus alamannorum; it remained relatively independent under the Alemanni dukes until the second quarter of the 8th century. The Alemanni began to settle into the valleys around 680, but for centuries the Germanic-speaking Alemanni and the Romansh-speaking Gallo-Romans coexisted. Romansh remained the main language in Einsiedeln until the 10th century.

In the 8th and 9th centuries the land was under the control of the Counts of the Zürichgau. The low-lying land along Lake Zürich was relatively easy to reach and was settled throughout the Middle Ages. During the Middle Ages, the Muotathal area was used by seasonal herders but there were very few permanent settlements. Küssnacht was first mentioned in documents in the 9th century, but it is likely that there were earlier settlements. The forests around Einsiedeln were lightly settled.

A visit of the Irish monks, Gallus and Columbanus in 611 is mentioned in the Gallusviten. However, their missionary efforts were unsuccessful in Schwyz. In the late 7th century Christianity began to spread into the region. The church at Tuggen was first built around 680/700, while the Aisleless church at Schwyz was built after 700. In the following centuries, the monasteries at Säckingen, St. Gallen and Reichenau all became centers of Christianity in the region. In 948, Einsiedeln Abbey was consecrated on the site of Saint Meinrad's murder in 861, in a high valley near Schwyz. When Einsiedeln Abbey was founded, it was granted many farms, villages and isolated churches, and it helped to spread Christianity into the high valleys.

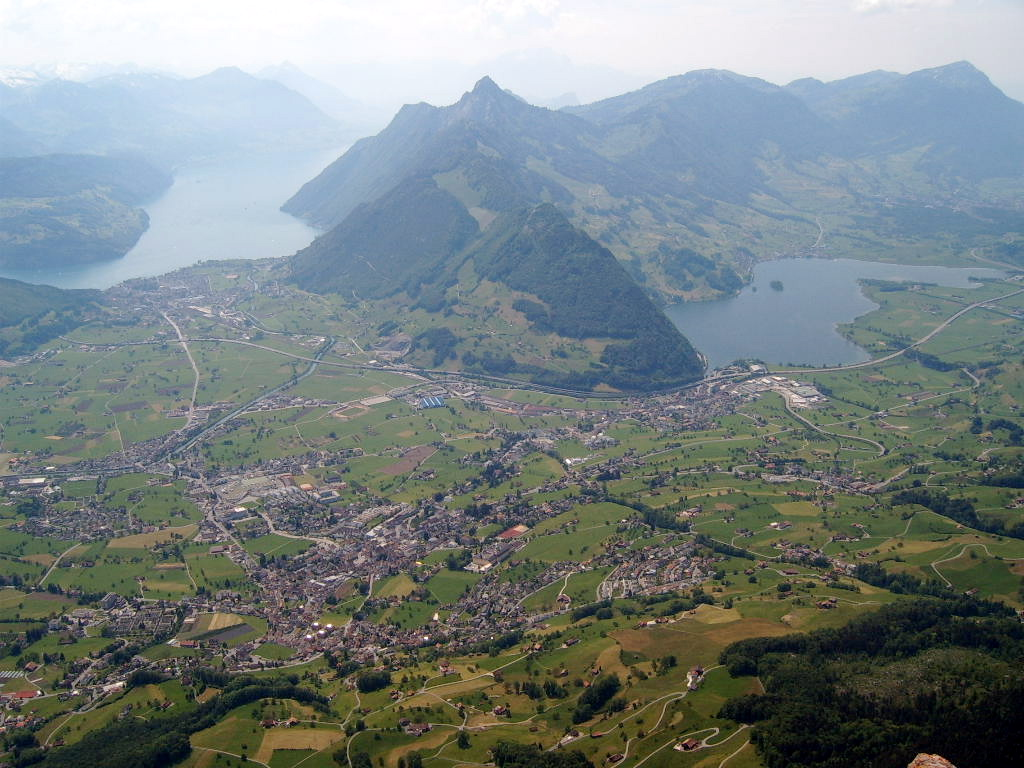
Schwyz valley, with Schwyz town in the center foreground, Mount Rigi in the right background, Lake Lucerne and Brunnen on the left and Lake Lauerz on the right

The valley of Schwyz is first mentioned in 972 under the name Suittes. Later, a community of freemen is found settled at the foot of the Mythen. These freemen, possessing common lands, were subject only to the count of the Zürichgau, as representing the German king. The economy benefited from the transit across the Gotthard mountain pass, but these profits attracted other powers, such as the Habsburgs.

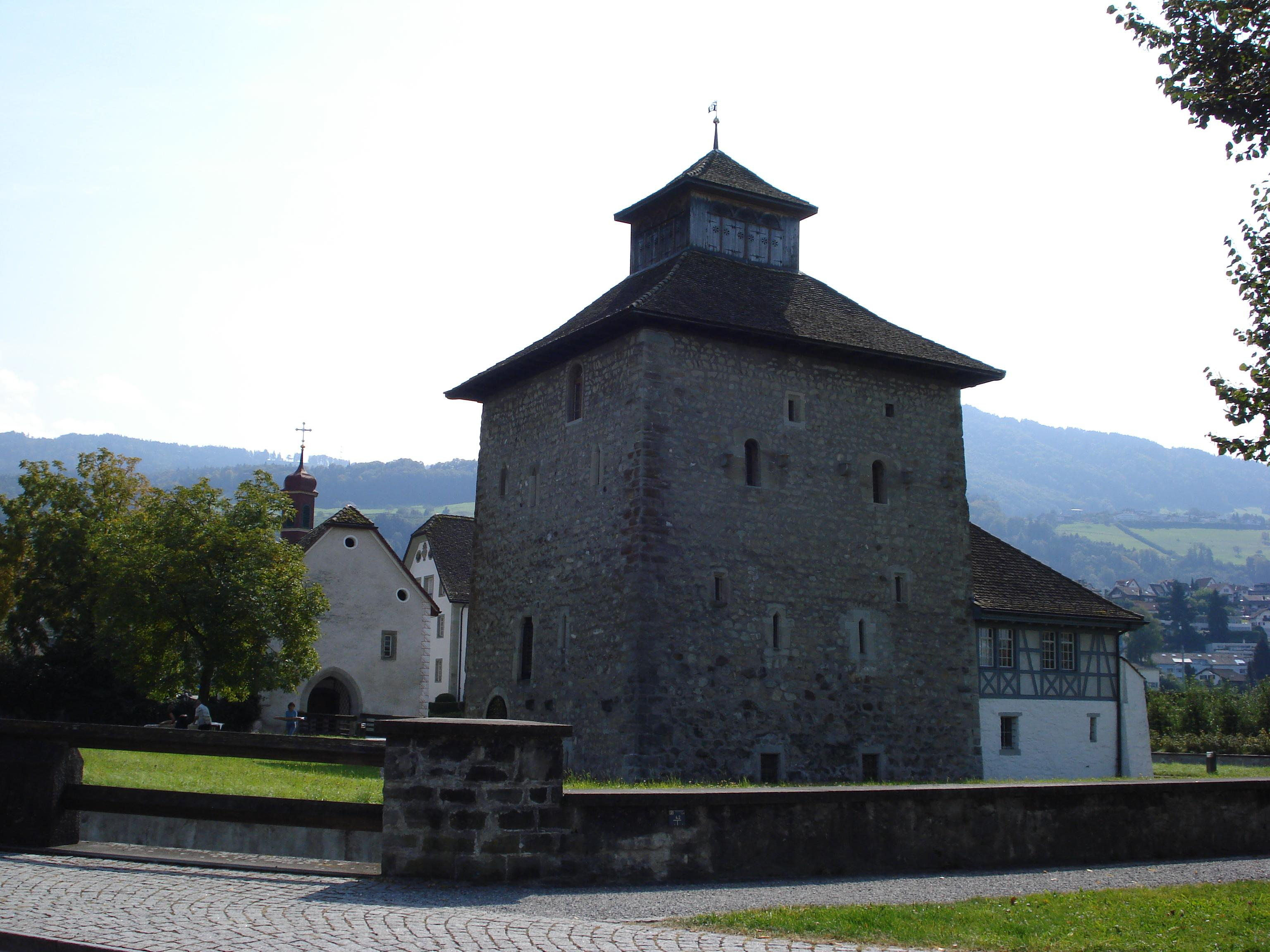
Pfäffikon Castle, one of the castles built by outside landlords to control their lands in Schwyz

The inner or mountainous portion of Schwyz was controlled by the Counts of Lenzburg, until that line died out in 1173. The Lenzburg lands were inherited by the Counts of Kyburg and Frohburg, the Lords of Rapperswil, and the Habsburgs.

During the 10th century, Einsiedeln Abbey became more and more powerful. The expanding town of Schwyz often encroached on lands that the abbey claimed. During the early 12th century, the Counts of Lenzburg (as the Count of the Zürichgau) unsuccessfully sued the abbey on behalf of Schwyz over land use and borders in the forest. Though the Counts were forced to pay a fine each time, the farmers of Schwyz continued to push into land claimed by the abbey. It soon controlled many of the surrounding lands, many of which are outside the area today covered by the canton of Schwyz. The outer or lake side parts of the canton were partly controlled by the monasteries of St. Gallen, Pfäfers, Rüti and Schänis, along with the Lords of Habsburg, Toggenburg and Rapperswil. Both Pfäffikon Castle and Alt Rapperswil Castle were built by these landlords to control their landholdings. In contrast to the Swiss Plateau, where the local nobility and knights ruled extensive landholdings for the regional counts, in Schwyz there were few local nobles. They were generally poorer and less important than the monasteries' representatives or the leaders of the local livestock collectives. Much of the farming or grazing land in the inner portion of Schwyz was not privately owned but was common land. To administer the land, the local collectives developed into regional collectives that covered several towns and villages. The collectives helped create a sense of unity throughout the farming towns and villages of the valleys and developed a tradition of independence.

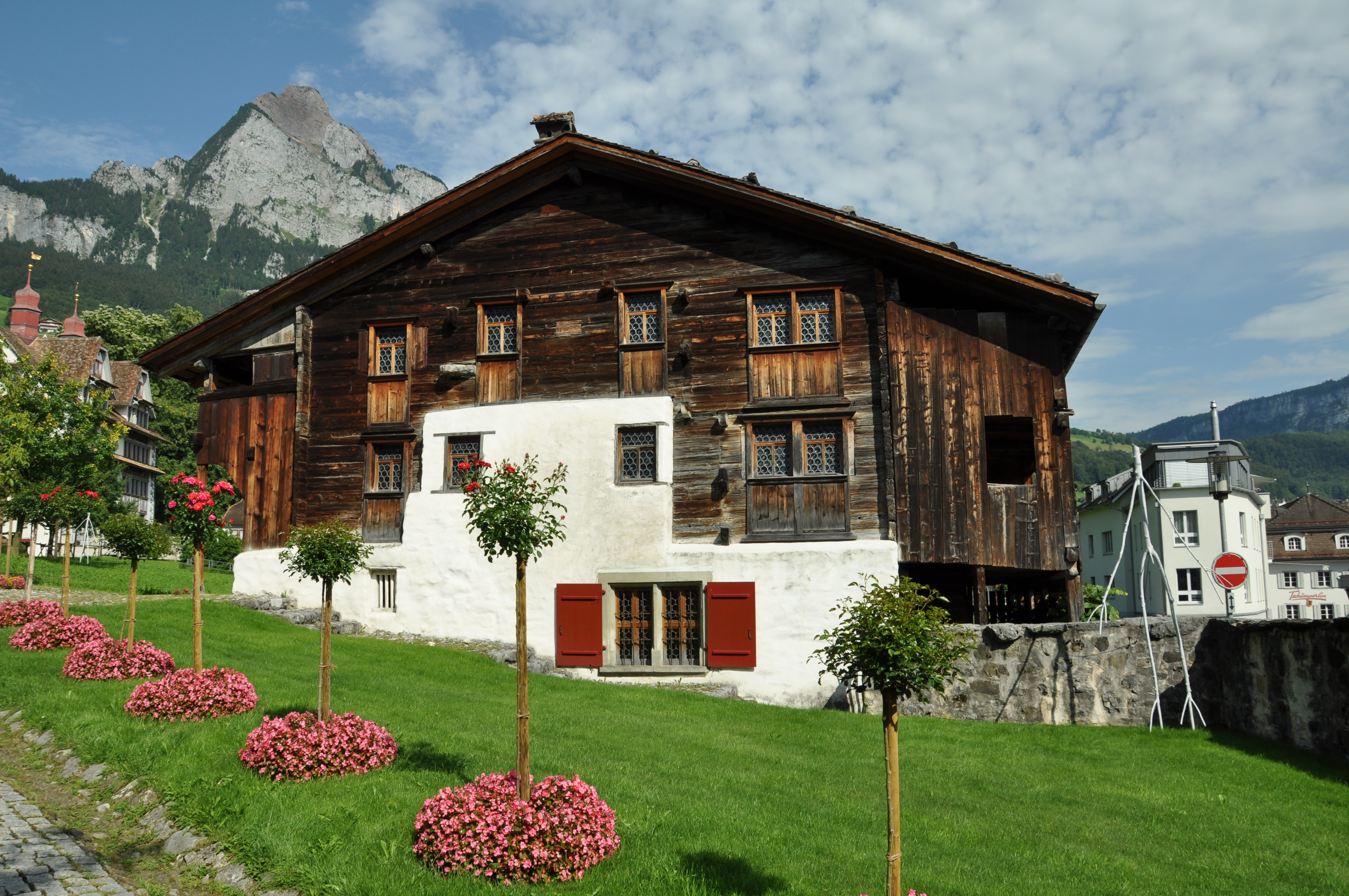
Haus Bethlehem in Schwyz. Built in 1287, it is Europe's oldest wooden house

With the extinction of the Kyburgs and the decline of the Lords of Rapperswil in the second half of the 13th century, the Habsburgs attempted to claim sovereignty over the Kyburg and Rapperswil lands in Central Switzerland. They succeeded in acquiring the parishes of Schwyz, Steinen, Muotathal and Morschach and, in 1283, the patronage over the monastery of Einsiedeln. In 1240, Emperor Frederick II granted the Schwyz valley imperial immediacy for services that they had rendered to the Emperor.

While the farming villages of the valleys drew closer together, the expansion of the Habsburgs and changing relationships between the farmers of the alpine valleys and the monasteries led to conflicts such as the Marchenstreit between Schwyz and Einseideln Abbey. The Marchenstreit started around 1100 over grazing rights around the Mythen mountains. It dragged on, accompanied by court cases and violent raids, until about 1350.

=== Eternal alliance ===
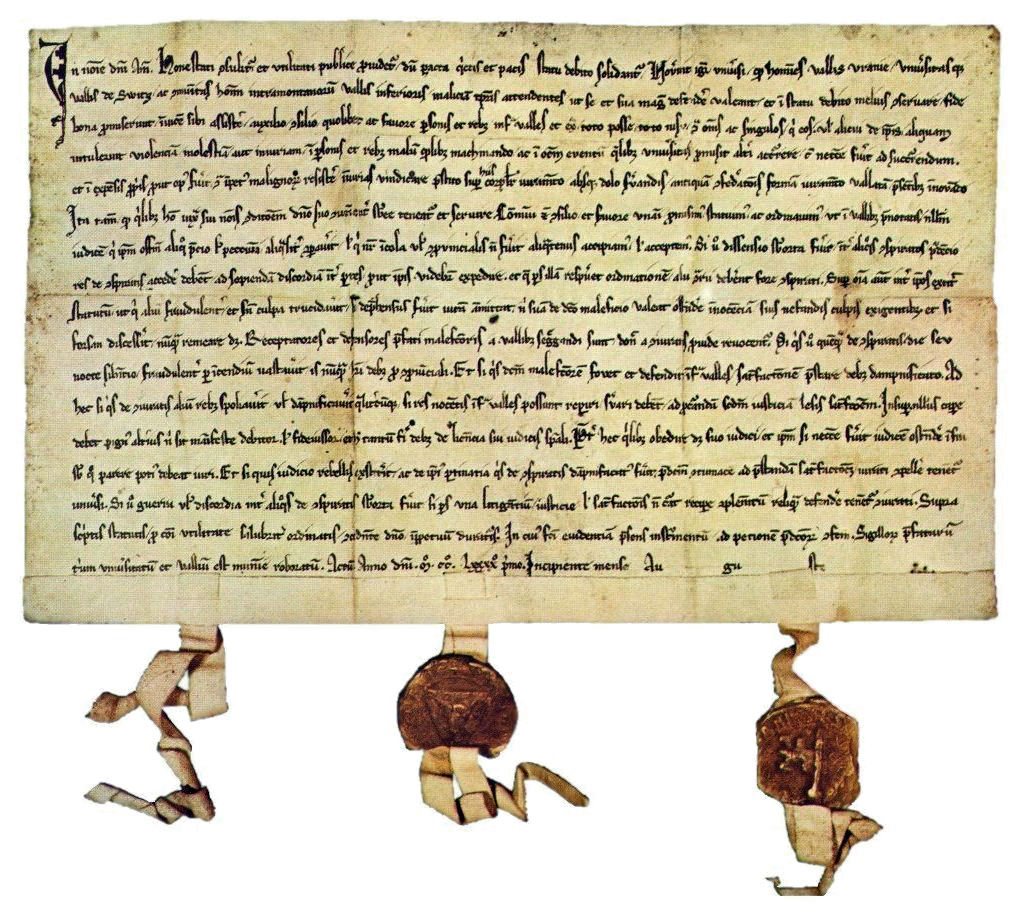
The Federal Charter of 1291, on display in Schwyz

Perhaps on 1 August 1291, the cantons of Schwyz, Uri, and Unterwalden entered into an Eternal Alliance: this would eventually become the Swiss Confederation. The Federal Charter of 1291 was probably prompted by the death of Rudolf I of Habsburg on 15 July 1291 and created a defensive alliance. The Rütlischwur (Oath of the Rütli) was another alliance among the Forest Cantons in or around 1308 and brought the cantons closer together. The canton of Schwyz took leadership in the confederation early on. As early as 1320, the name of the canton was applied to the whole of the confederation. It was only in 1803, however, that the name Schweiz, as derived from the canton of Schwyz, became the official name of Switzerland. The flag of Switzerland is derived from the banner of Schwyz.

With the Eternal Alliance, the three cantons remained politically independent, with a central council to deal with disputes among the members, and with promises of military assistance. The cantons became de facto independent from the Habsburgs at the same time as the Habsburgs were attempting to expand into the Forest Cantons. When the century-old Marchenstreit between Schwyz and Einseideln Abbey led to a Schwyz attack on the Abbey in 1314, the Habsburgs, as patrons of the Abbey, had an opportunity for military action against them.

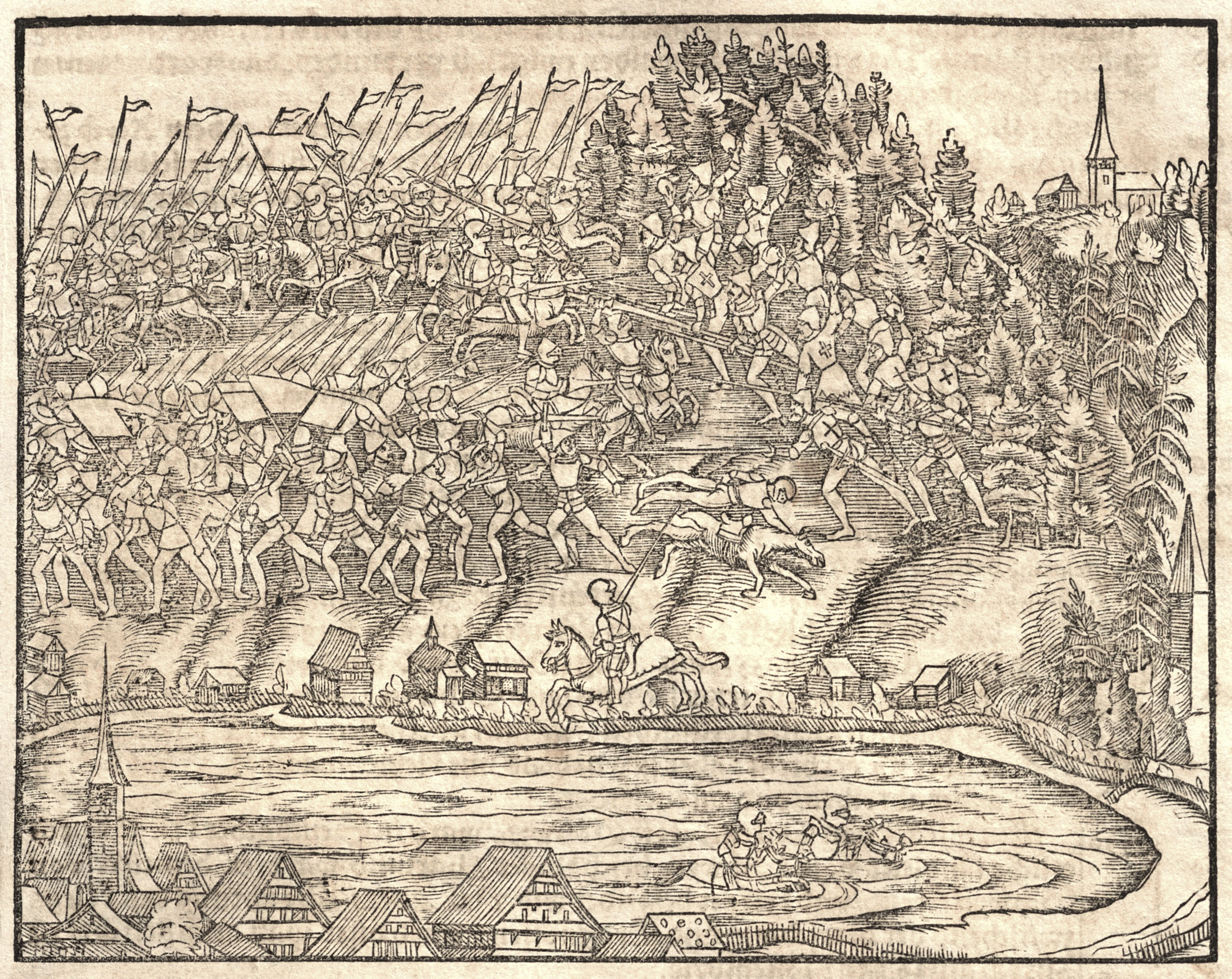
The Battle of Morgarten, the first battle of the new Confederation against the Habsburgs

On 15 November 1315, Leopold of Austria led a large army of knights to crush the rebellious confederates, planning a surprise attack from the south via Lake Aegeri and the Morgarten pass, and counting on a complete victory over the rebellious peasants. The chronicle of Johannes von Winterthur concerning the battle puts the Austrian forces at 20,000, though that number is certainly inflated. Another account says that there were 9,000 men in the Austrian army, while Delbrück holds that the Austrian army was only 2,000-3,000 but mostly knights.

The Confederates of Schwyz — supported by the Confederates of Uri, who feared for their autonomy, but not supported by the Confederates of Unterwalden — expected the army in the west near the village of Arth, where they had erected fortifications. The size of the Confederate army is also disputed, with some chronicles placing it at 1,500, while others state that it was 3,000-4,000. Even if the Confederate army outnumbered the Habsburgs, they were an untrained militia against a force of well-equipped and trained knights.

The Confederates prepared a road block and an ambush at a point between Lake Aegeri and the Morgarten Pass where the narrow path led between the steep slope and a swamp. When the Austrian army entered the ambush, the Confederates attacked from above with rocks, logs and halberds. The knights had no room to defend themselves and suffered a crushing defeat, while the foot soldiers in the rear fled back to the city of Zug. About 1,500 Habsburg soldiers were killed in the attack.

After the victory at Morgarten, the Forest Cantons met at Brunnen on 9 December 1315 to renew the promise of mutual military assistance. The Pact of Brunnen, which emerged from the meeting, changed the pragmatic defensive alliance into a full confederacy. During the following forty years, five nearby cities (Lucerne in 1332, Zürich in 1351, Glarus and Zug in 1352 and Bern in 1353) joined the Pact and began the growth of the Old Swiss Confederacy.

=== Old Swiss Confederation ===
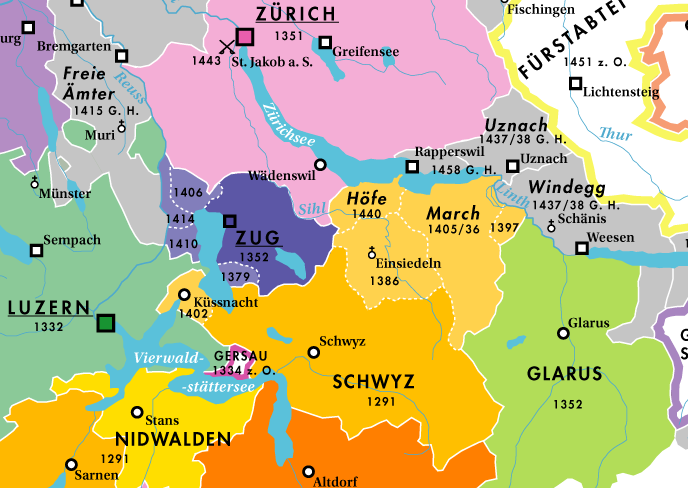
The growth of the canton of Schwyz

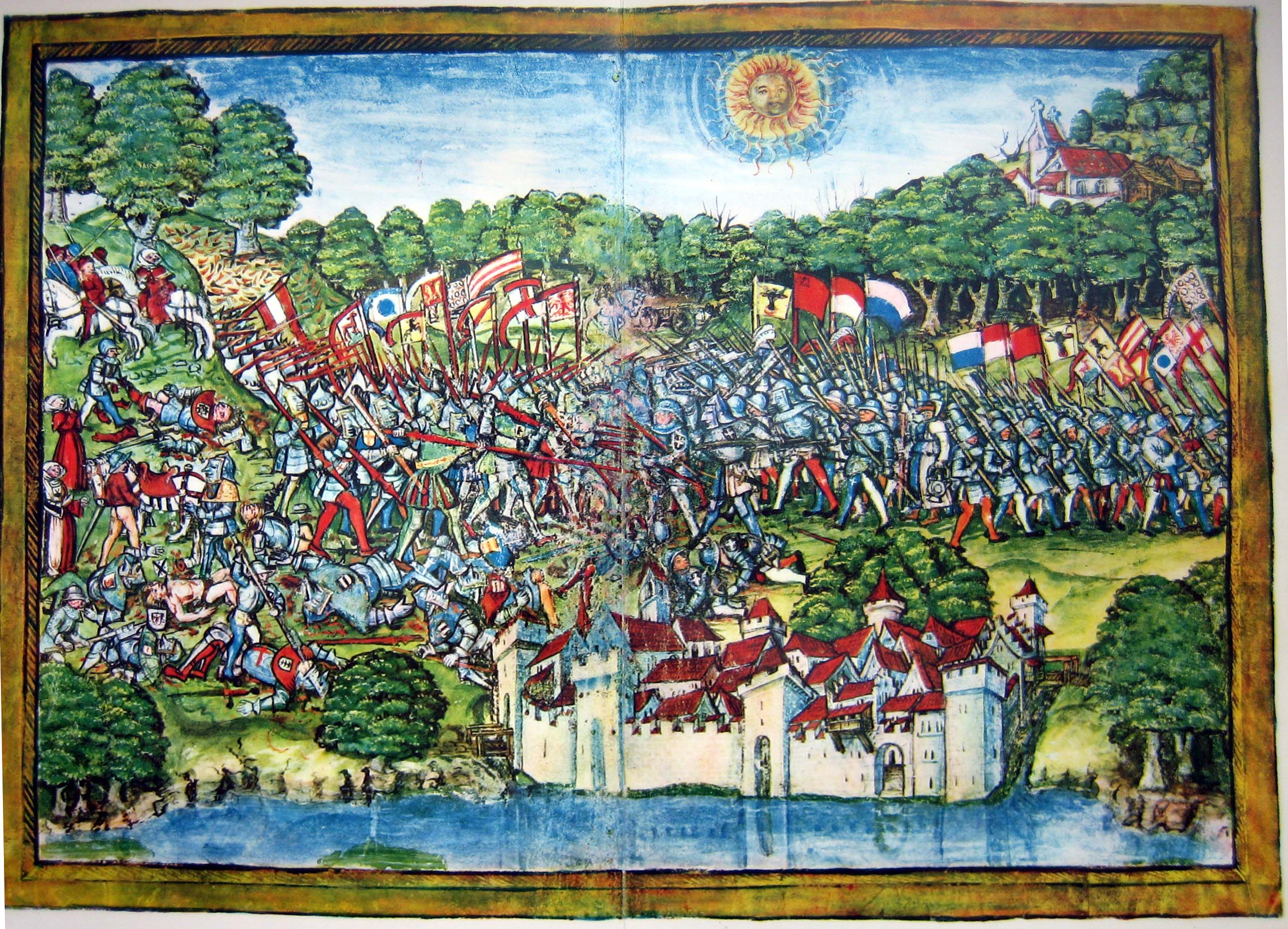
The Battle of Sempach from the Luzerner Schilling (1513)

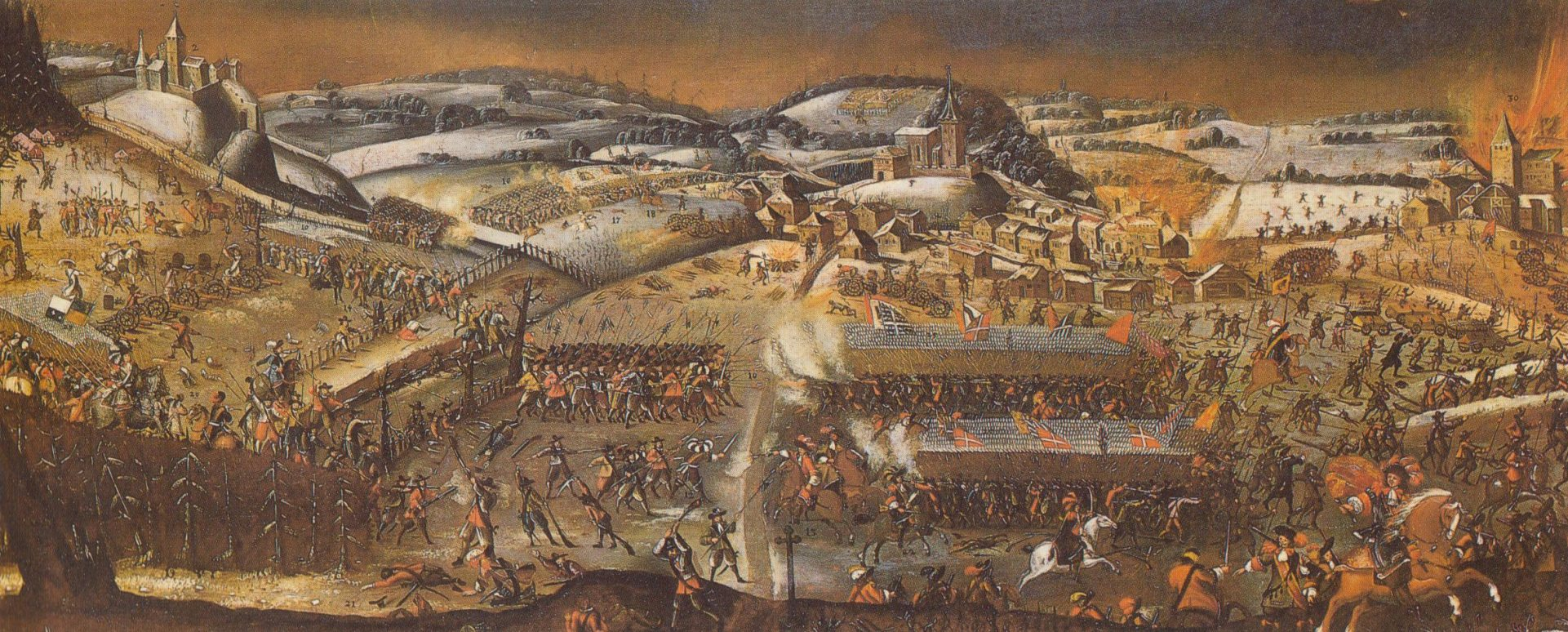
The First Battle of Villmergen

As the Confederation expanded, Schwyz took a leading role in the new organization. The aggressive, expansionist foreign policy of Schwyz led to its name being applied to the entire Confederation. Even in the 14th century, the chronicles of the surrounding countries referred to the Confederation as Schwyzer or Schweizer (the modern German spelling).

With its exterior borders secured, Schwyz began to acquire rights and land in the neighboring valley. In 1386, Schwyz invaded and occupied the town of Einsiedeln, and by 1424 the monastery was under Schwyz' control, though it retained some independence. Between 1386 and 1436, Schwyz brought under its direct control the entire March District, which became part of the canton. In 1424, Küssnacht became part of the canton. Villages and lands along Lake Zürich, including Wollerau and Pfäffikon (in 1440), Hurden and Ufenau Island all became part of the canton in the 14th and 15th centuries. King Sigismund granted Schwyz the right to High Justice over Schwyz, Einsiedeln, Küssnacht and March in 1415 as a reward for their military support against Frederick IV of Habsburg. The gradual expansion of Schwyz meant that each village entered the canton under different agreements and not all the provinces were granted the same degree of autonomy. One unique case was the town of Gersau which, while located near Schwyz, became a protectorate of the Confederacy and a semi-independent state in 1359. Gersau remained a free city-state and republic until 1817 when it was merged into Schwyz.

In 1385, Zürich, Zug and Lucerne attacked several Habsburg strongholds and in the following year Lucerne entered into alliances with several Habsburg cities in an attempt to pull those cities into Lucerne's sphere of influence. In response, Leopold III of Austria gathered an army and prepared to invade the Confederation. After a minor battle, a short-lived armistice was declared, but by early July 1386 the Habsburg army was on the move toward the Lucerne city of Sempach. On 9 July 1386 a Confederation force from Lucerne, Uri, Schwyz and Unterwalden met the Austrian army in the Battle of Sempach. While the Habsburg knights initially drove the lightly armored Swiss back, around mid-day the Swiss gained the upper hand and killed Leopold and forced his army to retreat. Much like the Battle of Morgarten, Sempach helped cement the Confederation into a further unified federation. While Schwyz gained no territory from the battle, both Bern and Lucerne gained significant territories at the expense of the Habsburgs.

In 1402/3, Schwyz signed an alliance with Appenzell, which was seeking independence from the Abbey of St. Gall. In May 1403, the Abbot and the Habsburgs sent a force to defeat the rebellious Appenzellers while Schwyz and Glarus sent troops to defend their ally. On 15 May 1403, the Abbot's forces entered the pass leading to Speicher, and outside the village of Vögelinsegg they met the Appenzell army. A detachment of about 80 Appenzellers started the attack from a hill over the valley, with about 300 soldiers from Schwyz and 200 from Glarus moving around the flanks of the army. When the League's cavalry charged up the hill, they met 2000 Appenzellers and were forced to retreat. During the retreat, about 600 horsemen and many of the 5000 infantry were killed by the Appenzell army. The League signed a peace treaty with Appenzell at Arbon, but the peace was short-lived. Appenzell formed an anti-Habsburg alliance, the Bund ob dem See, with several cities including Bregenz. In 1408 the Habsburgs besieged Bregenz, and the Bund, including Schwyz, marched out to support Bregenz. However, when they met the Habsburgs, the Bund was decisively defeated and the Bund collapsed. Schwyz paid the Habsburgs off to avoid an attack and Appenzell retained some independence but eventually became an associate of the Confederation.

In 1440–1446, Schwyz and six other cantons fought against Zürich and the Habsburgs in the Old Zürich War. The eventual peace brought Zürich back into the Confederation and forced them to cancel their treaty with the Austrians. After the war, Schwyz acquired the villages of Wollerau and Pfäffikon (now in Freienbach) and shared control of Uznach and Gaster (both now in St. Gallen) with Glarus. The war also showed that the confederation had grown into a political alliance so close that it no longer tolerated separatist tendencies of a single member.

In the 15th century, Schwyz joined Uri and Nidwalden in attempting to expand south of the Gotthard Pass to gain the revenue from trade over the pass. By the 16th century they controlled, as a federal condominium, the Riveria valley, the Blenio valley, the Maggia valley and the towns of Bellinzona, Lugano, Mendrisio and Locarno.

In 1480, Heinrich von Gundelfingen collected a number of local legends into a book called the Herkommen der Schwyzer und Oberhasler (Traditions of the Schwyzer and Oberhasler) which claimed that the land had been settled by 6,000 Swedes and 1,200 East Frisians after they rescued the Pope from a barbarian attack in 400 AD. The central elements of the myth, the Swedish origin and the rescue of the Pope became central elements in the Schwyzer state mythos. By 1531, this special relationship to the Catholic faith and the Pope was specifically mentioned in a resolution that passed in the Landsgemeinde. This resolution was passed against the backdrop of the Protestant Reformation and the tensions following the First War of Kappel two years earlier. Soon thereafter, the Catholic cantons refused to help the Three Leagues (Drei Bünde) in Graubünden in the Musso war against the Duchy of Milan, Zürich promptly considered this a breach of contracts between the confederacy and the Three Leagues and declared an embargo against the five alpine Catholic cantons, in which Bern also participated. While the Tagsatzung had successfully mediated in 1529, on this occasion the attempt failed, not least because the reformation leader Huldrych Zwingli was eager for a military confrontation. The Catholic cantons declared war on Zürich on 9 October 1531. On 11 October 1531, Schwyz, Uri and Zug decisively defeated the army of Zwingli. Hundreds of soldiers were killed, including Zwingli himself. Schwyz remained staunchly Catholic following the war.

In 1655, the canton of Schwyz began prosecuting those Protestant families who had remained in Schwyz. Some were turned in to the inquisition in Milan, some were beheaded, and the property of those who fled to Protestant Zürich was confiscated. Zürich demanded compensation for this property. Schwyz demanded the return of the refugees. Zürich urged Bern to declare war on the Catholic cantons (Schwyz and its allies Uri, Unterwalden, Zug and Lucerne). Zürich's forces laid a fruitless siege of Rapperswil, while Catholic forces separated Zürich from Bern, beating the Bernese at the First Battle of Villmergen on 24 January 1656. Hostilities ceased on 20 February and the treaty of Villmergen of 7 March reinstalled the status quo preceding the outbreak of hostilities, wherein each canton could specify the religion of all its residents. However, religious tensions continued to rise. When the abbot of St. Gallen proposed to build a "Catholic" road from Schwyz to Austria that would cut off the Protestant part of Glarus from its support in Zürich, the Protestant cantons declared war on the Abbot. After the Protestant victory at the Second Battle of Villmergen, religious equality was established in the Confederation.

Throughout the time of the Old Swiss Confederation, the direct democracy of the Landsgemeinde in Schwyz was seen as the most important political institution in the canton and the municipalities of the canton. The Landsgemeinde generally met on the last Sunday in April. Mayors and other government officials were elected, new laws were discussed and voted on and traditional rights were reconfirmed. The Landsgemeinde usually met at Ibach outside Schwyz town, though there were several alternative locations. In the towns, the Landsgemeinde was made up of all land holding males or citizen. By the 16th century this class had begun to develop into an elite class that tended to lead the Landsgemeinde and be appointed as mayors. Below the citizens there was a class of residents, who were allowed to use the common land but had limited rights or political power. In the 16th century it was possible for a resident to buy his way into citizenship, however by the 17th century this had become almost impossible. To pay for the Second Battle of Villmergen, Schwyz allowed residents to once again buy citizenship. The Landsgemeinde meetings sometimes collapsed and led to riots. There were often many parties represented and the alliances and factions changed quickly and unpredictably. Schwyz was often characterized as an enfant terrible due to the unyielding Catholicism along with the political chaos of the Landsgemeinde.

=== Helvetic Republic to the federal state ===
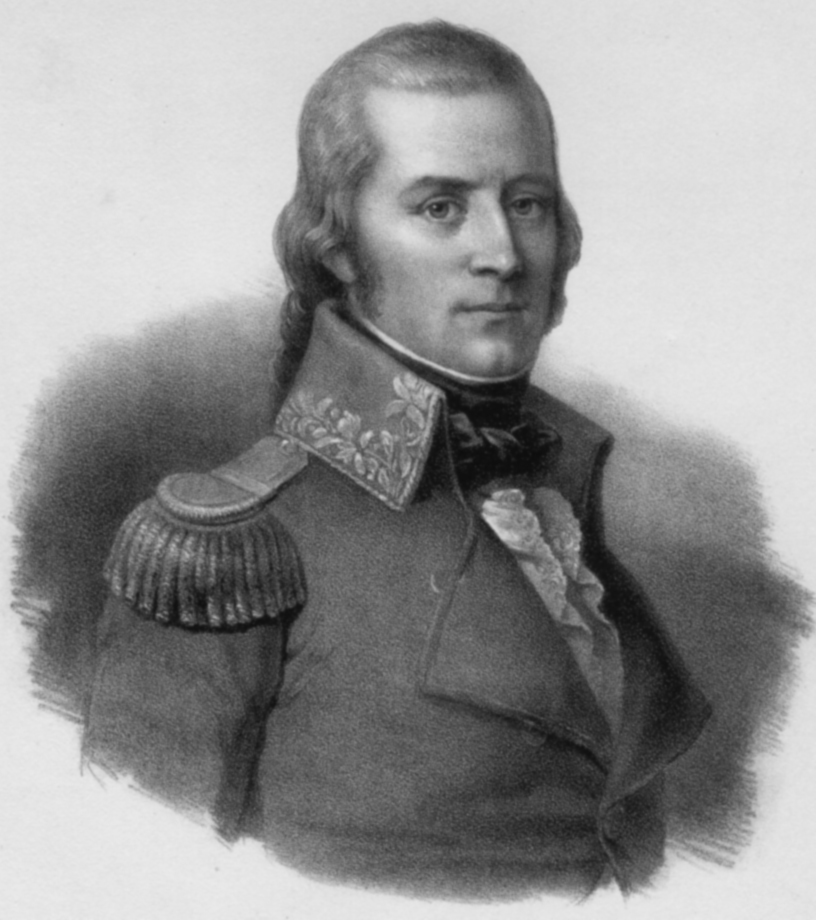
Alois von Reding led Central Swiss troops against the French.

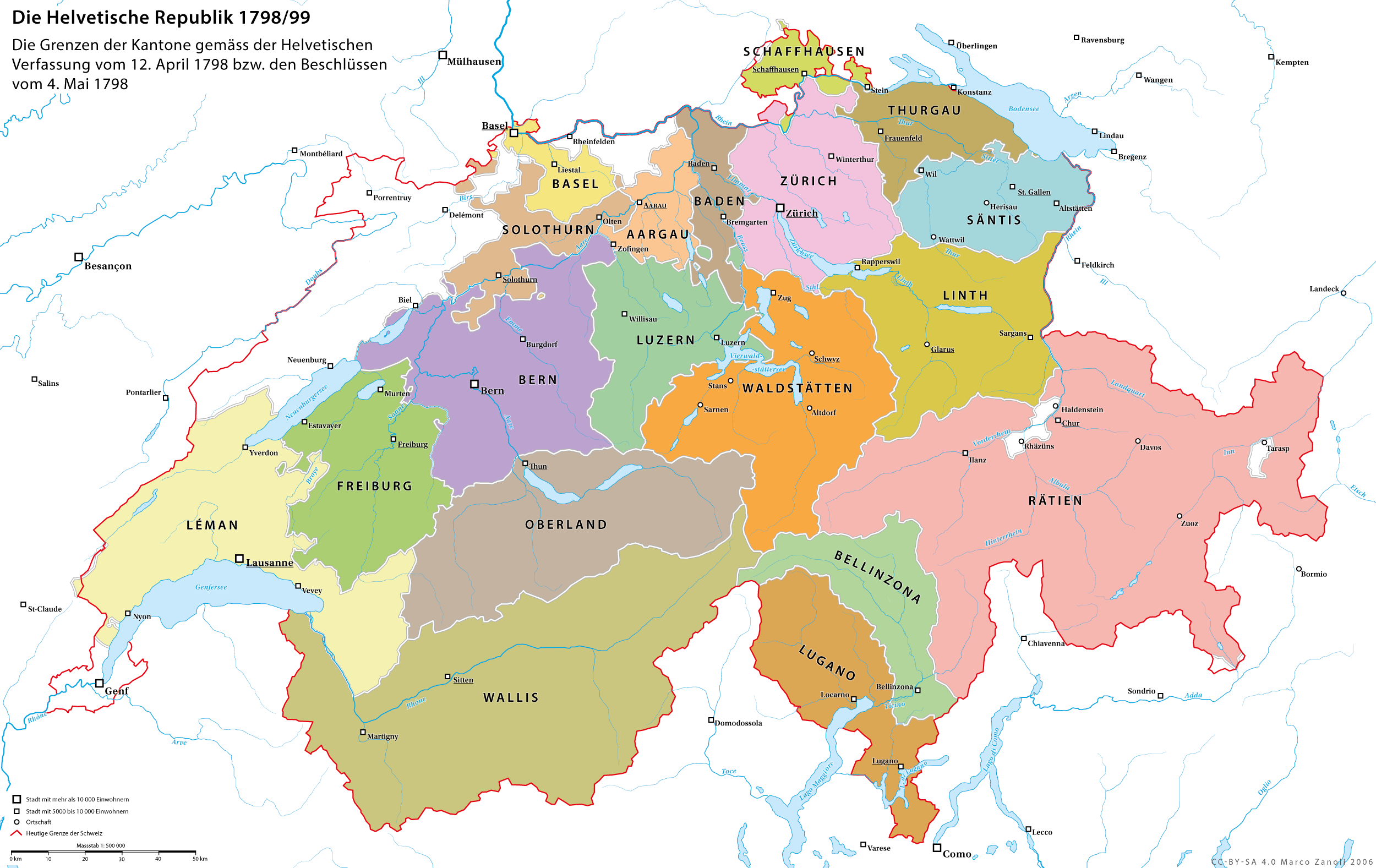
The Helvetic Republic, as at the constitution of 12 April 1798, showing the canton of Waldstätten in orange, centre

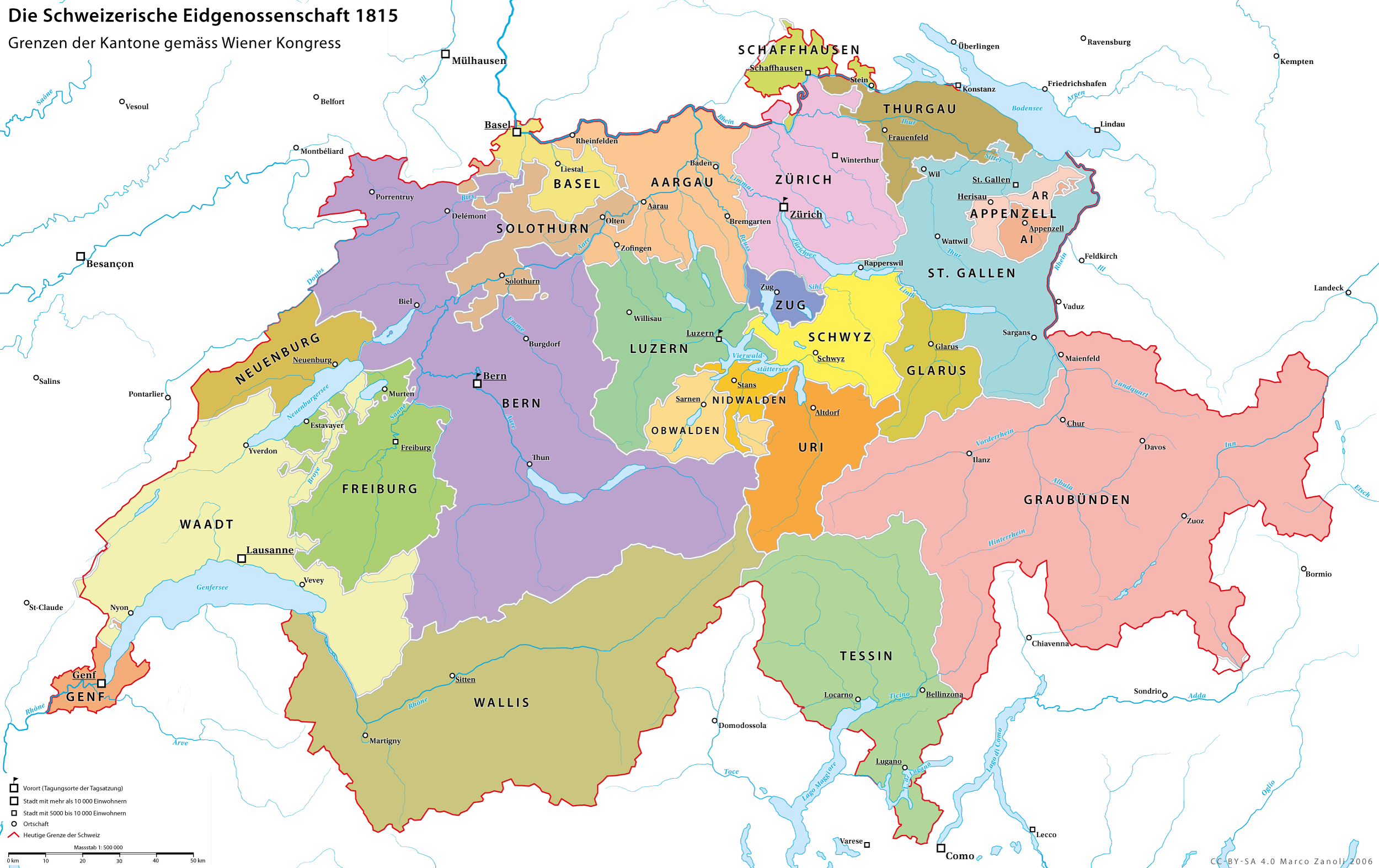
Switzerland following the Congress of Vienna, with the borders of Outer Schwyz and Inner Schwyz

During the years leading up to the 1798 French invasion of Switzerland, the spiritual leadership of the canton often preached against the anti-Catholic parts of the French Revolution. In the Landsgemeinde in the spring of 1798, the leadership spoke out strongly against the French and urged the people to take an uncompromising position against the newly created Helvetic Republic and the limited freedom of religion in the Republic.

In response, the cantons of Uri, Schwyz and Nidwalden raised an army of about 10,000 men led by Alois von Reding to fight the French. This army was deployed along the defensive line from Napf to Rapperswil. Reding besieged French-controlled Lucerne and marched across the Brünig pass into the Berner Oberland to support the armies of Bern. At the same time, the French General Balthasar Alexis Henri Antoine of Schauenburg marched out of occupied Zürich to attack Zug, Lucerne and the Sattel pass. Even though Reding's army won victories at Rothenthurm on 2 May 1798 and Morgarten, Schauenburg's victory near Sattel allowed him to threaten the town of Schwyz. On 4 May 1798, the town council of Schwyz surrendered. Reding surrendered to the French on 13 May.

To help break the political power of the Inner Cantons, Uri (without the Leventina but with the Urseren), Schwyz (without March and Höfe), both half-cantons of Unterwalden, Zug, the Republic of Gersau and Engelberg Abbey were merged into the canton of Waldstätten. The new canton only had 4 seats in the Tagsatzung instead of the 16 that its members had held before the invasion. Initially, the victorious French army only lightly occupied the old core of the canton of Schwyz, but plundered the Einseideln Abbey. However, after a failed uprising in Nidwalden in the fall of 1798, Schwyz was forced to hand over all weapons and to provide supplies and housing to French troops. The heavy demands of the occupying French led to the uprising known as the Hirthemmli War in April 1799. After the French suppressed this uprising, they moved the capital of the canton of Waldstätten to Zug.

In summer and autumn of 1799, the outbreak of the War of the Second Coalition brought renewed fighting to Schwyz. In mid-August the French General André Masséna drove the Austrian-Russian army out of the Schwyz valley. By the end of September they were fighting in the March valley. Simultaneously, the Russian General Alexander Suvorov crossed the Kinzig Pass with his army and began fighting the French in the Muota valley. Suvorov was unable to force his way out of the canton and was eventually driven over the Pragel Pass to Glarus. The destruction and looting from both armies stripped the canton of food and ruined fields, causing hardship and death among the Schwyzer during the following winter.

Joseph Thomas Fassbind compiled a history of the canton during this period, published in the 1830s.

After the 1803 Act of Mediation, Schwyz regained its independence and most of the changes introduced by Napoleon were reverted. The old subject lands were converted into full and equal districts and the formerly independent towns of Gersau and Reichenburg joined the new canton of Schwyz. The loss of power in the old core of Schwyz led to resentment and tension in the canton. After the abolition of the Act of Mediation in February 1814 the old core tried to usurp the leadership role in the canton and strip the right to political participation from the former subject lands. The old subject lands resisted this and the old core was forced to agree to the 1814 Constitution which granted equal rights to all citizens. However, they were able to include the provision that the two-thirds of the seats would come from the old core of Schwyz. Furthermore, the highest cantonal authorities came from the old core. While the new constitution removed the legal difference between citizens and residents, residents were not allowed to use the extensive land owned by the citizen's community. Tensions continued to escalate until in the Landsgemeinde of 1829, the residents from the former subject lands were driven out of the assembly. The former subject lands saw this as a clear threat to their equality, and encouraged by the July Revolution of 1830 the four outer districts; March, Einsiedeln, Pfaeffikon and Küssnacht signed a new constitution which guaranteed, among other things, proportional representation. The leaders of the old core saw this as a threat to their authority and rejected the new constitution. On 9 March 1831 the outer districts seceded from Schwyz and formed the canton of Outer Schwyz with the capital in Einsiedeln. In 1832 they established a new constitution, government and courts. In spring 1833, the Swiss Tagsatzung acknowledged the new canton, but insisted that they work toward reunification.

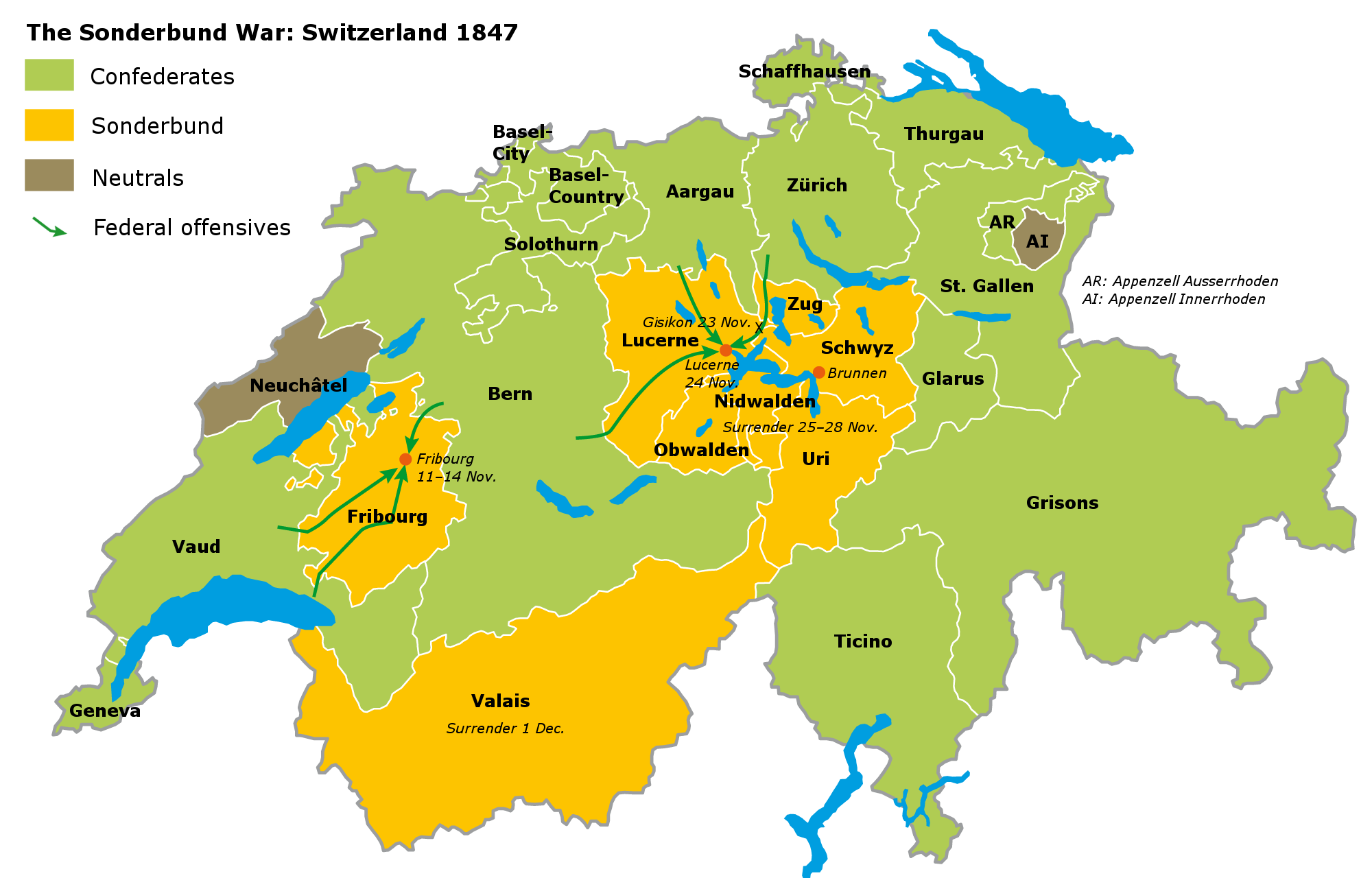
Map of the Sonderbund War

An altercation in Küssnacht between supporters and opponents of secession offered Inner Schwyz the opportunity to resolve the crisis with military action. They invaded and occupied Küssnacht on 31 July 1833. The Outer Schwyz and Lucerne appealed to the Swiss Confederation, which responded by invading Inner Schwyz in August. Shortly thereafter the two half-cantons reunited under a constitution that guaranteed equal rights for all residents. In the Landsgemeinde of 13 October 1833, the voting residents of the canton chose two liberal minded leaders, but shortly thereafter the conservative faction came into power again.

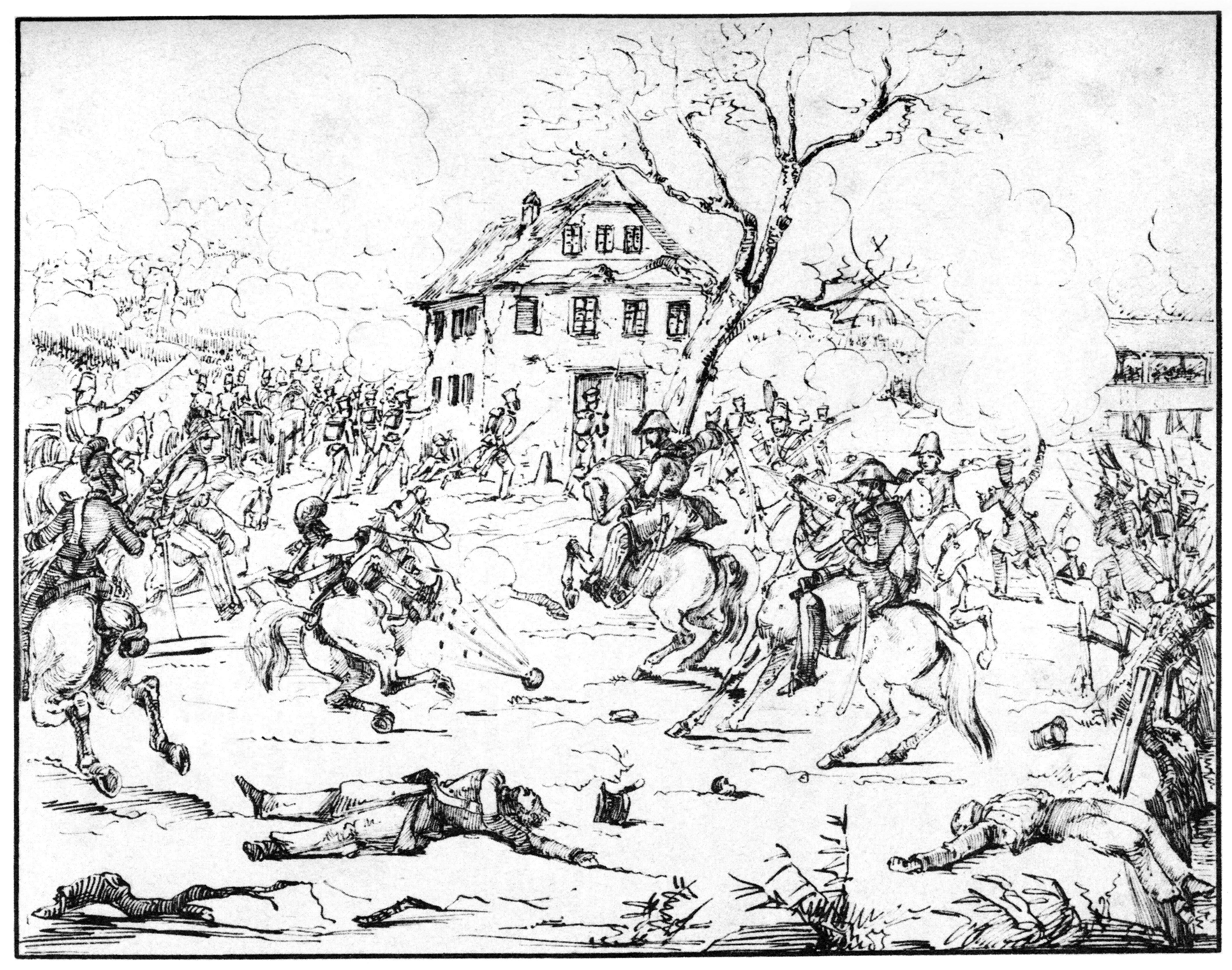
Pen and ink drawing of Federal troops fighting at the bridge of Gislikon

Under the conservative government, the canton joined the Sonderbund (separate alliance in German) in 1845 to protect cantonal sovereignty and the Catholic religion. When the Tagsatzung attempted to dissolve the Sonderbund on 21 October 1847, the Catholic cantons rebelled. On 23 November 1847 Federal troops defeated the Sonderbund at Gislikon and drove the Schwyzer army back at Meierskappel. Four days later the Sonderbund surrendered.

The conservative government of Schwyz was dissolved and a new provisional government and constitution established. The first attempt at a constitution, which split the district of Schwyz in two and moved the cantonal capital away from Schwyz, was narrowly defeated on 27 January 1848. The second constitution, which removed the mentioned points and merged the former districts of Wollerau and Pfäffikon in the district of March, was then approved by the electorate on 27 February 1848.

The new constitution of 1848 reformed the government of the canton. Perhaps the greatest change was that it abolished the Landsgemeinde, which had formerly been the supreme authority. It split the government into three branches, legislature, executive and judiciary and created a three-tier structure of municipalities, districts and canton. It created proportional representation and allowed the population to vote on laws and constitutional amendments.

=== Modern Schwyz ===
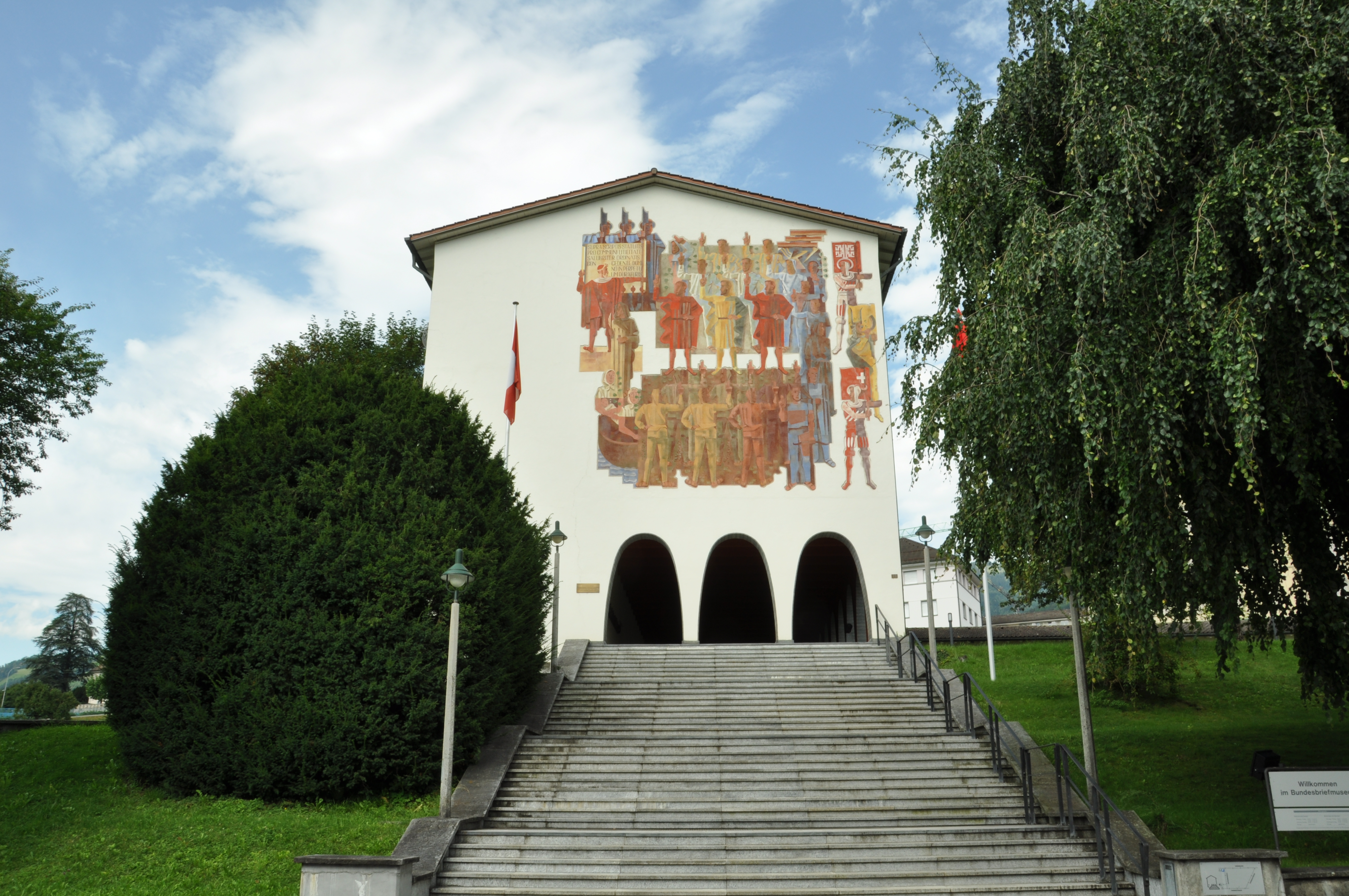
The Museum of the Swiss Charters of Confederation in Schwyz was built during the 1930s to house the Federal Charter of 1291 which was seen as the origin of Switzerland.

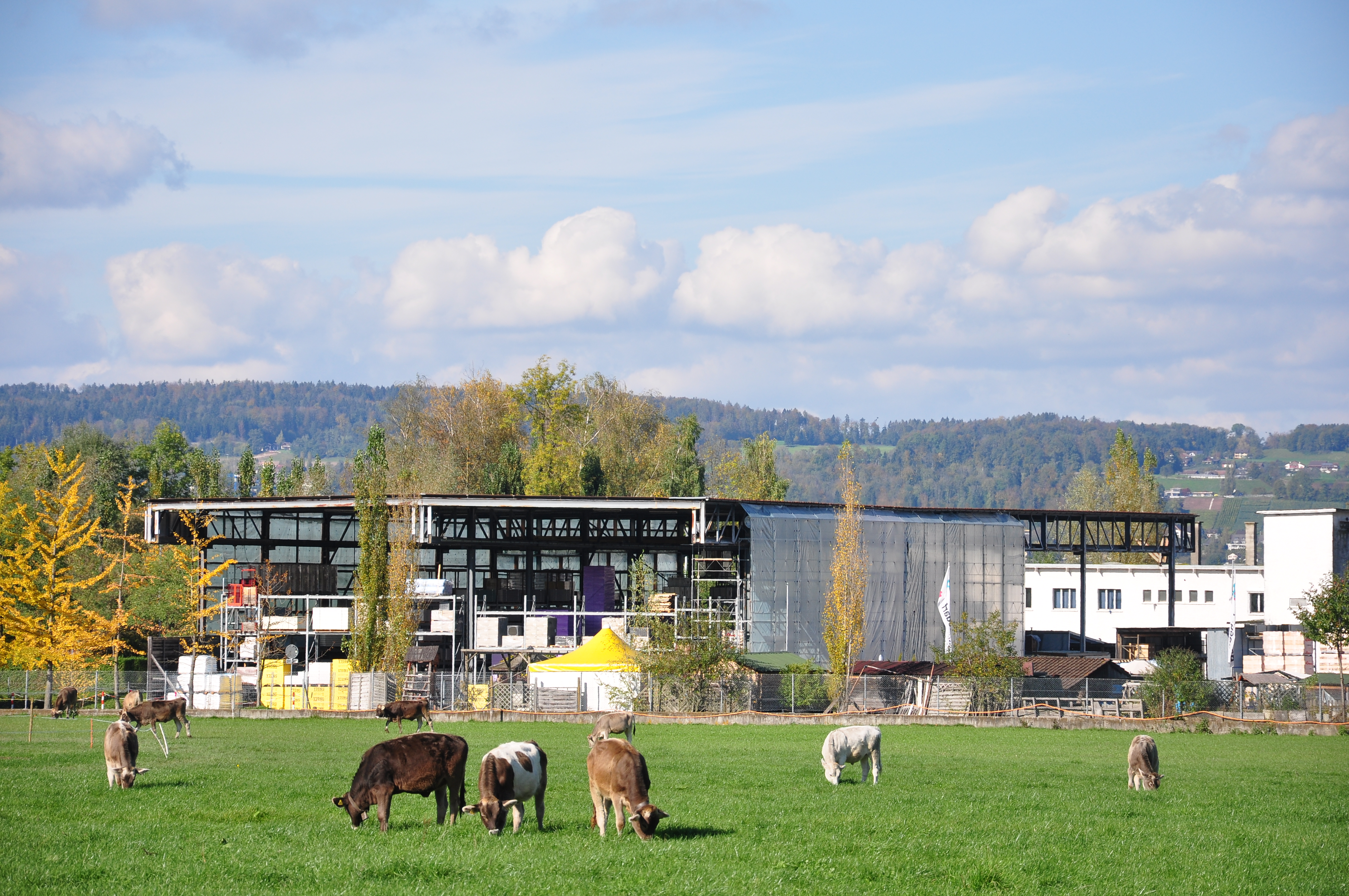
Farm land and industrial buildings side by side in Pfäffikon. Only a small percentage of the population is still active in agriculture in the canton.

With the end of the Landsgemeinde in the new constitution, the cantonal elections on 3 December 1848 brought a conservative majority parliament. However, the cantonal councils then selected a liberal-conservative and liberal government. The government had the difficult task of reunifying the canton and supporting the new federal government, which 75% of Schwyzer opposed. Over the next few years the new government focused, almost exclusively, on integrating the canton into the new Confederation. Federal forgiveness of the Sonderbund War debt in 1852 and hosting the Federal Officers Festival in 1856 and the Federal Shooting Festival of 1867 all helped to reintegrate the canton.

A conservative ballot initiative in 1854 failed to reestablish the Landsgemeinde and abolish the districts, while a liberal initiative in 1866, which attempted to expand personal rights, also failed. In the early 1870s, the conservatives gained power in the cantonal government. In 1874, the Swiss Federal Constitution was completely revised, which created conflicts with the Schwyz cantonal constitution. It was revised in 1876 and accepted by 73% of voters. The new cantonal constitution limited the scope of the cantonal laws and extended the requirements for mandatory referendums.

In the mid-1890s, the liberals began to push for another constitutional revision. Their revisions included language that would give the government authority over the monasteries and their assets. The conservatives fought back with a platform of protecting the religion of most Schwyzer. In response, the government created a second version, which dropped the controversial religious portions but was otherwise unchanged. This new constitution, which required elections every four years, the popular election of all members of parliament, proportional representation in the cantonal councils and full religious freedom, was approved on 23 October 1898. This constitution remained in force, with amendments, until 2011.

Between 1833 and 1950 the population of the canton doubled from 38,351 to 71,082 people, though this increase was slower than the national average. The railroad to Küssnacht allowed that town to grow much faster than average between 1870–1914. At about the same time, a wave of immigrants from Europe (mostly from Italy) moved into the canton and a larger group of Schwyzer emigrated to the United States. On a per capita basis, Schwyz had the third highest emigration rate in Switzerland as people left for jobs. During late 19th and early 20th century, internal migration also changed the composition of the population. In 1860 almost 80% of the residents lived in the village of their birth, by 1950 it was only 50%.

The First World War was very hard on the residents of the canton. The cantonal authorities did little to prevent war time profiteering and prices for food and other necessities skyrocketed (the alternative being price controls, shortages and the creation of a Black Market). At the same time, extensive unemployment and low wages led to starvation and poverty. Some of the major industries in Schwyz at the time were tourism and the textile cottage industry, both of which collapsed, so the canton suffered disproportionately. In 1918, Schwyzer troops were called up to join the Federal Army in suppressing striking workers in the canton of Uri, in Rapperswil and in the Zürich Oberland. When the Spanish flu broke out in the army camps many Schwyzer soldiers died. The poverty and death led to a polarization of politics and the Conservatives used the slogan of "flu-dead soldiers" until the mid-1930s.

During the Second World War, Schwyz was generally insulated from the effects of the war. Several fortresses were built on the Rigi, in the Sattel Pass and on the Etzel and the Linth plains as part of the National Redoubt fortifications. During the war, Schwyz was twice the center of national attention. Once in 1941 on the occasion of the 650th anniversary of Confederation and in 1942, with the arrest of the owner of a dairy and mill for the extensive black market operations.

Between 1950 and 2010, the population doubled again to 146,730 people in 2010. During this period Schwyz showed one of the highest growth rates among the Swiss cantons. The highest growth was in the Outer Schwyz region. The Höfe district grew from 7,573 in 1950 to around 27,000 people in 2010. In 2004, Freienbach replaced Schwyz as the largest municipality in the canton.

The cantonal administration introduced a "logo" to represent its "corporate identity" in 1995. This was discussed controversially, and a popular initiative demanded that solely the coat of arms was to be used to represent the canton. The initiative was rejected by the popular vote on 7 December 1997, and the logo has been used officially since 1998.

== Geography ==
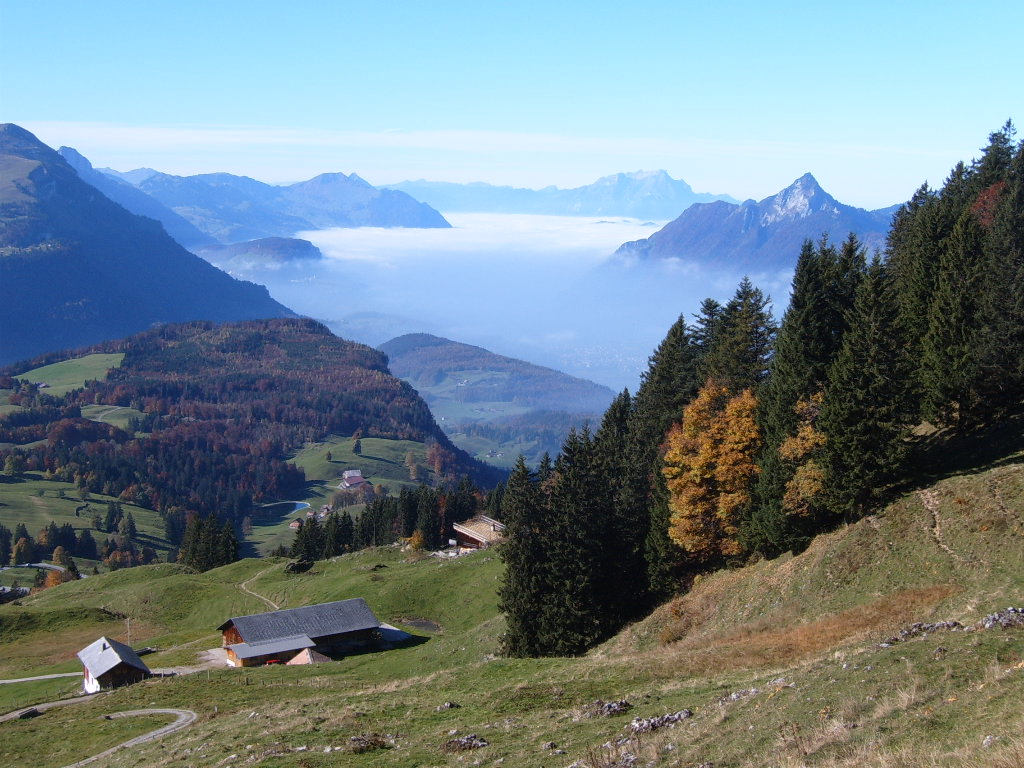
View from hiking trail between Ibergeregg and Spirstock

The canton of Schwyz is located in Central Switzerland. It is bordered by the cantons of St. Gallen, Zug and Zurich to the north, Glarus to the east, Uri to the south, and Lucerne and Nidwalden to the west.

Schwyz has an area, as of 2011, of 908.2 square kilometers (350.7 mi^{2}). Of this area, 41.0% is used for agricultural purposes, while 33.7% is forested, 5.4% is settled (buildings or roads) and 20.0% is unproductive land.

The river Sihl and the smaller Muota, Alp and Wägitaler Aa traverse the canton. Other rivers are the Biber, Minster and Waag. The canton includes parts of Lake Zurich (Zürichsee, including Obersee) and Lake Lucerne (Vierwaldstättersee). Only a small part of Lake Zug is within the canton of Schwyz. The minor lakes Lauerz (Lauerzersee), Sihl (Sihlsee) and Wägital (Wägitalersee), however, are completely within the canton of Schwyz. The last two mentioned lakes are reservoirs. Until the early 16th century AD, there used to be another lake south of the Obersee, called Tuggenersee (Lake Tuggen). Ufenau and Lützelau are two islands of Lake Zurich located in the canton of Schwyz.

It lies within the Schwyz Alps. The highest elevation is the Bös Fulen at 2,802 m (9,193 ft). Although not as high, the summits of the Rigi massif (Kulm, 1,798 m [5,899 ft], and Scheidegg, 1,665 m [5,463 ft]) are probably the most famous mountains within the borders of the canton.

== Political subdivisions ==
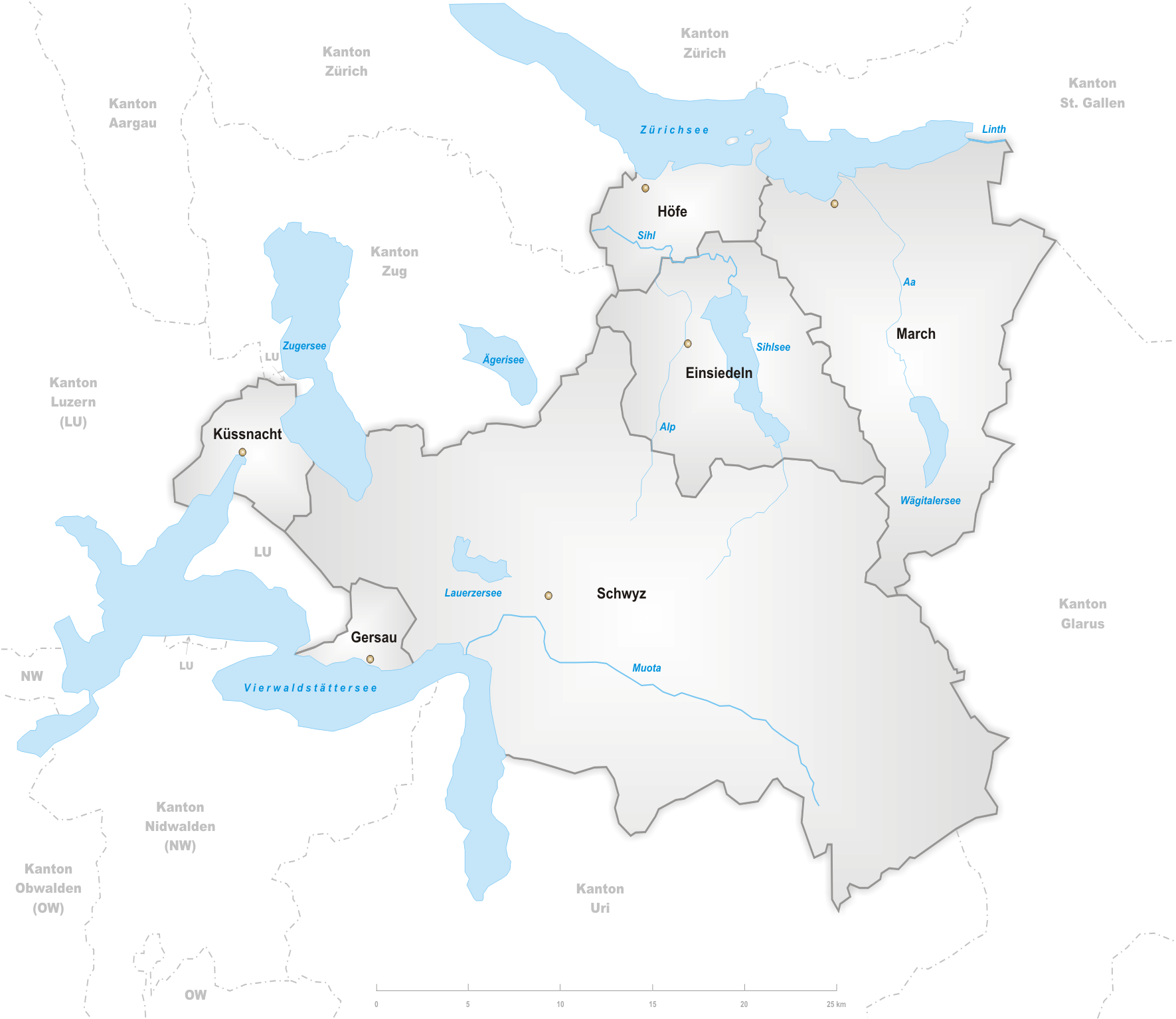
Districts of the canton of Schwyz

The canton is divided into six districts and 30 municipalities, although the Einsiedeln, Küssnacht and Gersau districts comprise the municipality of the same name. The largest towns are Küssnacht and Pfäffikon.

District	Municipalities
Schwyz District	Schwyz, Arth, Ingenbohl, Muotathal, Steinen, Sattel, Rothenthurm, Oberiberg, Unteriberg, Lauerz, Steinerberg, Morschach, Alpthal, Illgau, Riemenstalden
Einsiedeln District	Einsiedeln
Gersau District	Gersau
Höfe District	Wollerau, Freienbach, Feusisberg
Küssnacht District	Küssnacht
March District	Lachen, Altendorf, Galgenen, Vorderthal, Innerthal, Schübelbach, Tuggen, Wangen, Reichenburg

== Coat of arms ==
The blazon of the coat of arms is Gules, a Confederate cross couped in the hoist argent.

== Demographics ==
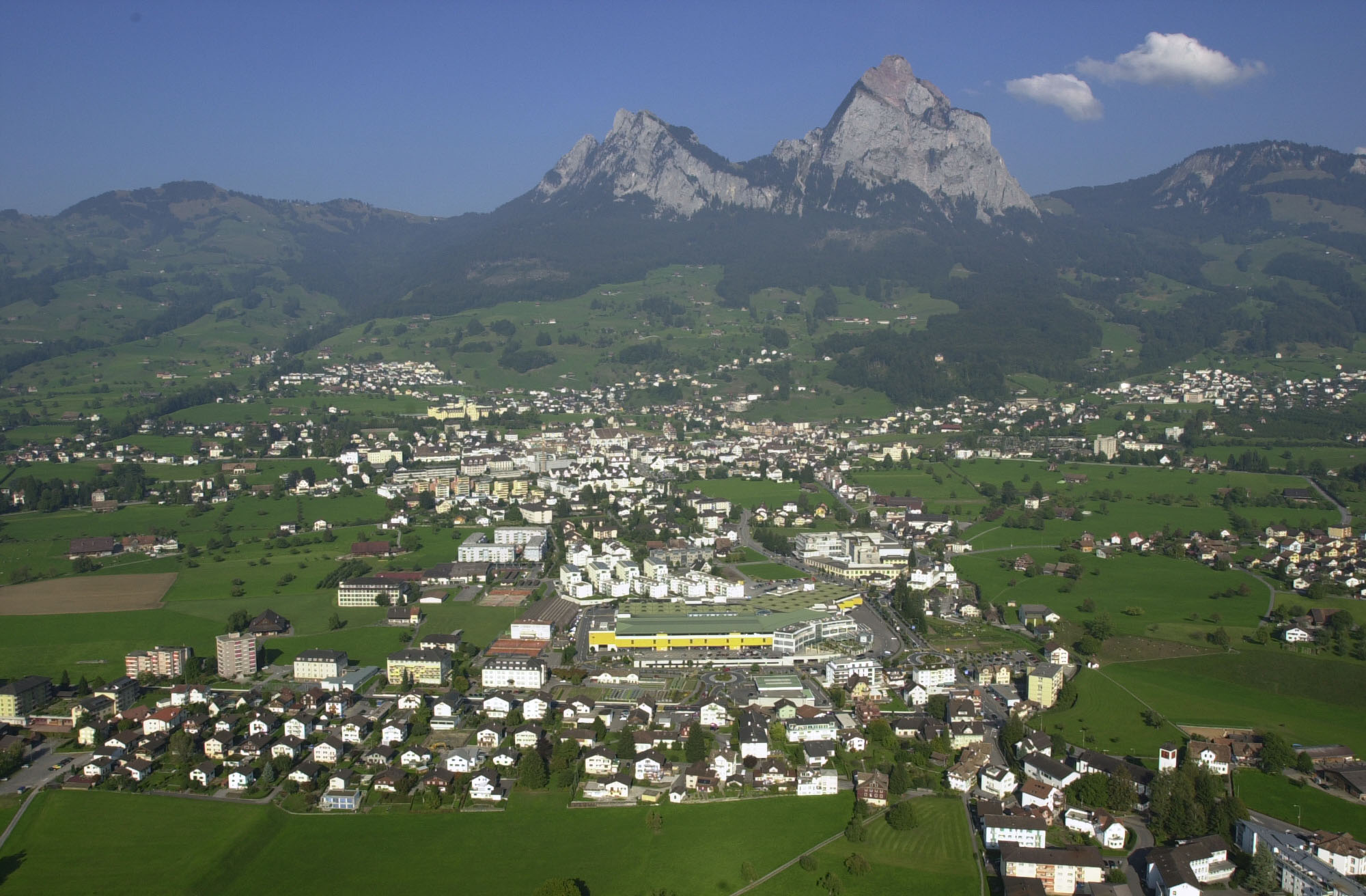
Schwyz town at the base of the Mythen mountains

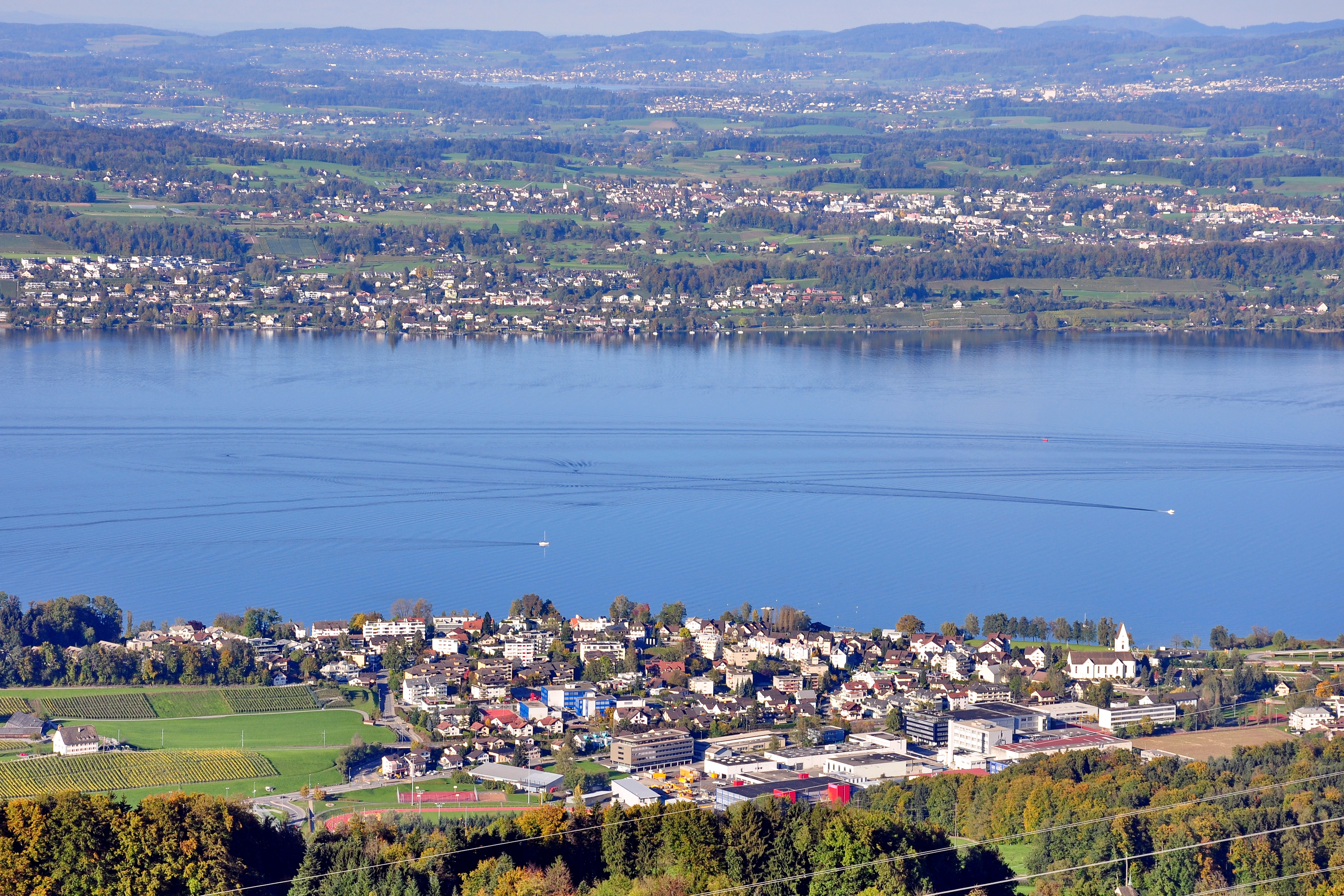
Freienbach in the foreground, on the shores of Lake Zürich

Schwyz has a population (as of December 2020) of 162,157. As of 2008, 15.6% of the population are resident foreign nationals. Over the last 10 years (2000–2010) the population has changed at a rate of 12.8%. Migration accounted for 10%, while births and deaths accounted for 3.9%.

Most of the population (as of 2000) speaks German (115,688 or 89.9%) as their first language, Serbo-Croatian is the second most common (2,667 or 2.1%) and Albanian is the third (2,477 or 1.9%). There are 502 people who speak French, 2,447 people who speak Italian and 234 people who speak Romansh.

As of 2008, the population was 49.9% male and 50.1% female. The population was made up of 5,824 Swiss men (42.2% of the population) and 1,058 (7.7%) non-Swiss men. There were 5,932 Swiss women (43.0%) and 988 (7.2%) non-Swiss women. Of the population in the canton, 50,778 or about 39.5% were born in Schwyz and lived there in 2000. There were 19,319 or 15.0% who were born in the same canton, while 35,617 or 27.7% were born somewhere else in Switzerland, and 19,622 or 15.2% were born outside of Switzerland.

As of 2000, children and teenagers (0–19 years old) make up 25.6% of the population, while adults (20–64 years old) make up 61.4% and seniors (over 64 years old) make up 12.9%.

As of 2000, there were 57,353 people who were single and never married in the canton. There were 59,385 married individuals, 6,201 widows or widowers and 5,765 individuals who are divorced.

As of 2000, there were 50,089 private households in the canton, and an average of 2.5 persons per household. There were 15,043 households that consist of only one person and 4,801 households with five or more people. As of 2009, the construction rate of new housing units was 7.8 new units per 1000 residents.

As of 2003 the average price to rent an average apartment in Schwyz town was 1185.58 Swiss francs (CHF) per month (US$950, £530, €760 approx. exchange rate from 2003). The average rate for a one-room apartment was 543.08 CHF (US$430, £240, €350), a two-room apartment was about 904.87 CHF (US$720, £410, €580), a three-room apartment was about 1068.78 CHF (US$860, £480, €680) and a six or more room apartment cost an average of 1461.34 CHF (US$1170, £660, €940). The average apartment price in Schwyz was 106.2% of the national average of 1116 CHF.

The vacancy rate for the canton, in 2010, was 0.97%.

== Historic population ==
The historical population is given in the following chart:

Historic Population Data
Year	Total Population	German Speaking	Italian Speaking	Catholic	Protestant	Other	Jewish	Islamic	No religion given	Swiss	Non-Swiss
1850	44,168			44,013	155					43,970	198
1880	51,109	49,631	1,377	50,266	954	15	7			48,585	2,524
1900	55,385	53,834	1,108	53,537	1,836	12	9			52,422	2,963
1950	71,082	69,231	1,191	66,297	4,642	64	15			68,416	2,666
1970	92,072	82,957	6,663	84,087	7,271	671	19	202	238	81,301	10,771
2000	128,704	115,688	2,447	92,868	16,401	19,389	51	5,598	6,331	108,381	20,323

== Politics ==
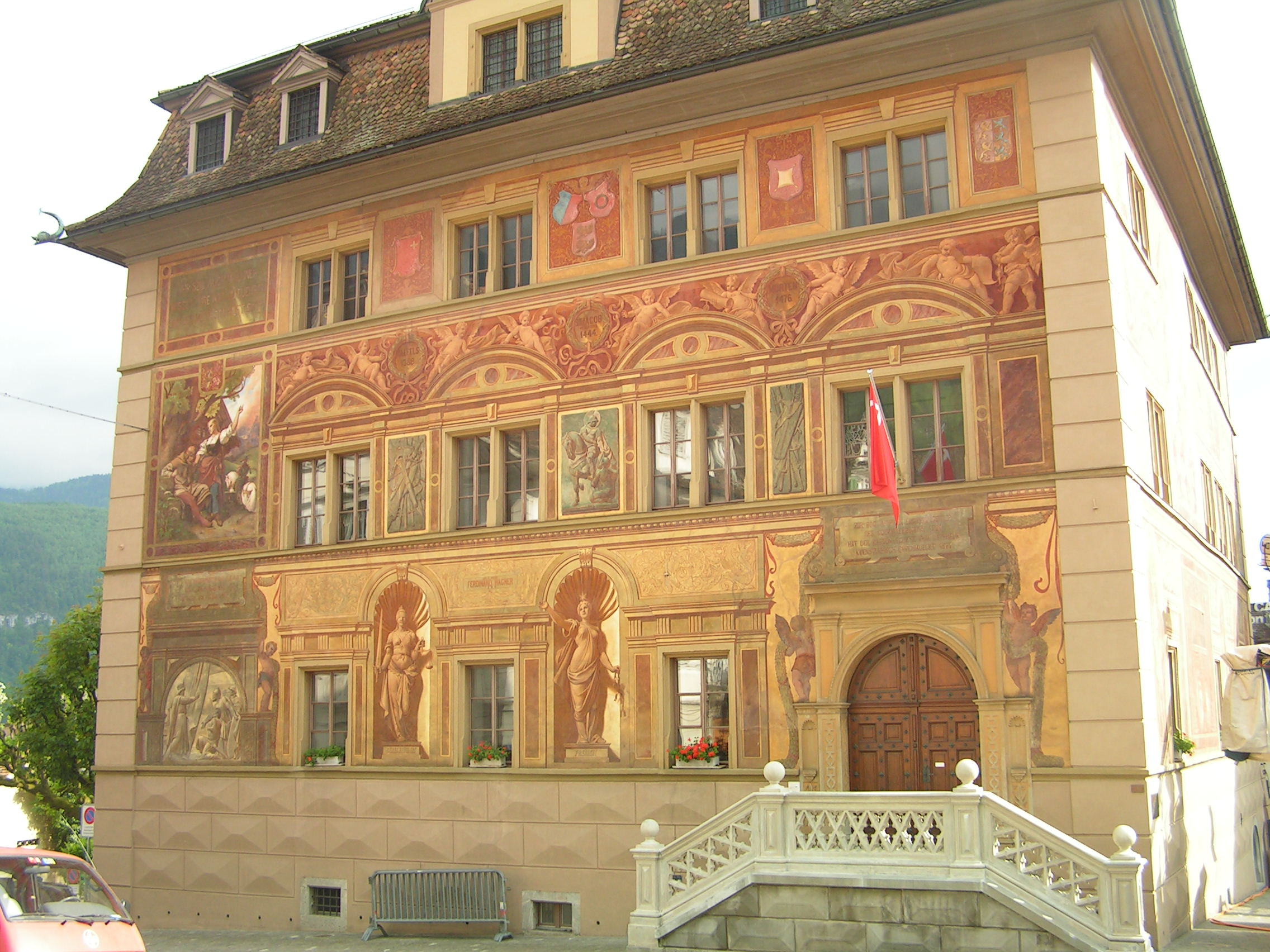
The Town Council House in Schwyz is also used for regular sessions of the Kantonsrat.

The cantonal constitution was rewritten in 2011. Before that, the constitution dates mainly from 1876, but was revised in 1898. Under the 1876/98 constitution, the legislature (Kantonsrat) is composed of members elected by a portion of the population and holds office for four years. Originally, each member of the Kantonsrat represented 600 people or a fraction thereof over 200 people. As the population has increased while the number of members has remained fixed at about 100, this has changed. After 2011, the 13 municipalities with the smallest population each elect one member of the Kantonsrat. The other 87 seats are divided between the remaining 17 municipalities based on population. The executive (Regierungsrat) consists of seven members who are elected by a popular vote, and hold office for four years. The two members of the federal Standerat and the four (three until 2003) of the federal Nationalrat are also chosen by a popular vote. In the case of all laws approved by the legislature and important financial measures there is a requirement for an obligatory referendum. Two thousand citizens may claim a popular vote as to any decrees or resolutions of the legislature, and have also the right of "initiative" as to the revision of the cantonal constitution or as to legislative projects.

=== Federal elections ===
In the 2011 federal election the most popular party was the SVP which received 38.0% of the vote. The next three most popular parties were the CVP (20.6%), the SP/PS (15.7%) and the FDP (15.5%).

The SVP lost about 7.0% of the vote when compared to the 2007 Federal election (45.0% in 2007 vs 38.0% in 2011). The CVP retained about the same popularity (20.1% in 2007), the SPS moved from below fourth place in 2007 to third and the FDP moved from below fourth place in 2007 to fourth.

==== Federal election results ====
Percentage of the total vote per party in the canton in the Federal Elections 1971-2015
Party	Ideology	1971	1975	1979	1983	1987	1991	1995	1999	2003	2007	2011	2015
FDP.The Liberals^{a}	Classical liberalism	20.4	21.3	28.0	26.0	24.3	25.9	24.0	19.1	15.4	16.7	15.5	20.6
CVP/PDC/PPD/PCD	Christian democracy	38.5	46.4	49.4	46.6	36.9	32.8	27.4	27.3	23.4	20.1	20.6	19.5
SP/PS	Social democracy	29.0	29.3	22.6	21.0	14.3	19.4	19.9	16.4	17.6	13.9	15.7	13.1
SVP/UDC	Swiss nationalism	* ^{b}	3.0	*	6.5	7.6	9.2	21.5	35.9	43.6	45.0	38.0	42.6
EVP/PEV	Christian democracy	*	*	*	*	*	*	*	*	*	0.9	1.1	*
GLP/PVL	Green liberalism	*	*	*	*	*	*	*	*	*	*	*	2.8
BDP/PBD	Conservatism	*	*	*	*	*	*	*	*	*	*	3.4	*
GPS/PES	Green politics	*	*	*	*	*	*	*	*	*	3.4	3.8	1.4
SD/DS	National conservatism	*	*	*	*	*	*	3.1	*	*	*	*	*
FPS/PSL	Right-wing populism	*	*	*	*	4.9	*	2.8	*	*	*	*	*
Other		12.1	*	*	*	12.0	12.7	1.3	1.4	*	*	1.9	*
Voter participation %		45.0	53.3	48.6	43.6	41.6	40.5	35.1	41.0	48.2	52.3	50.5	53.7

^a FDP before 2009, FDP.The Liberals after 2009
^b "*" indicates that the party was not on the ballot in this canton.

=== Cantonal elections ===
The evolving party membership in the Kantonsrat is shown in the following chart (for selected dates):

== Economy ==
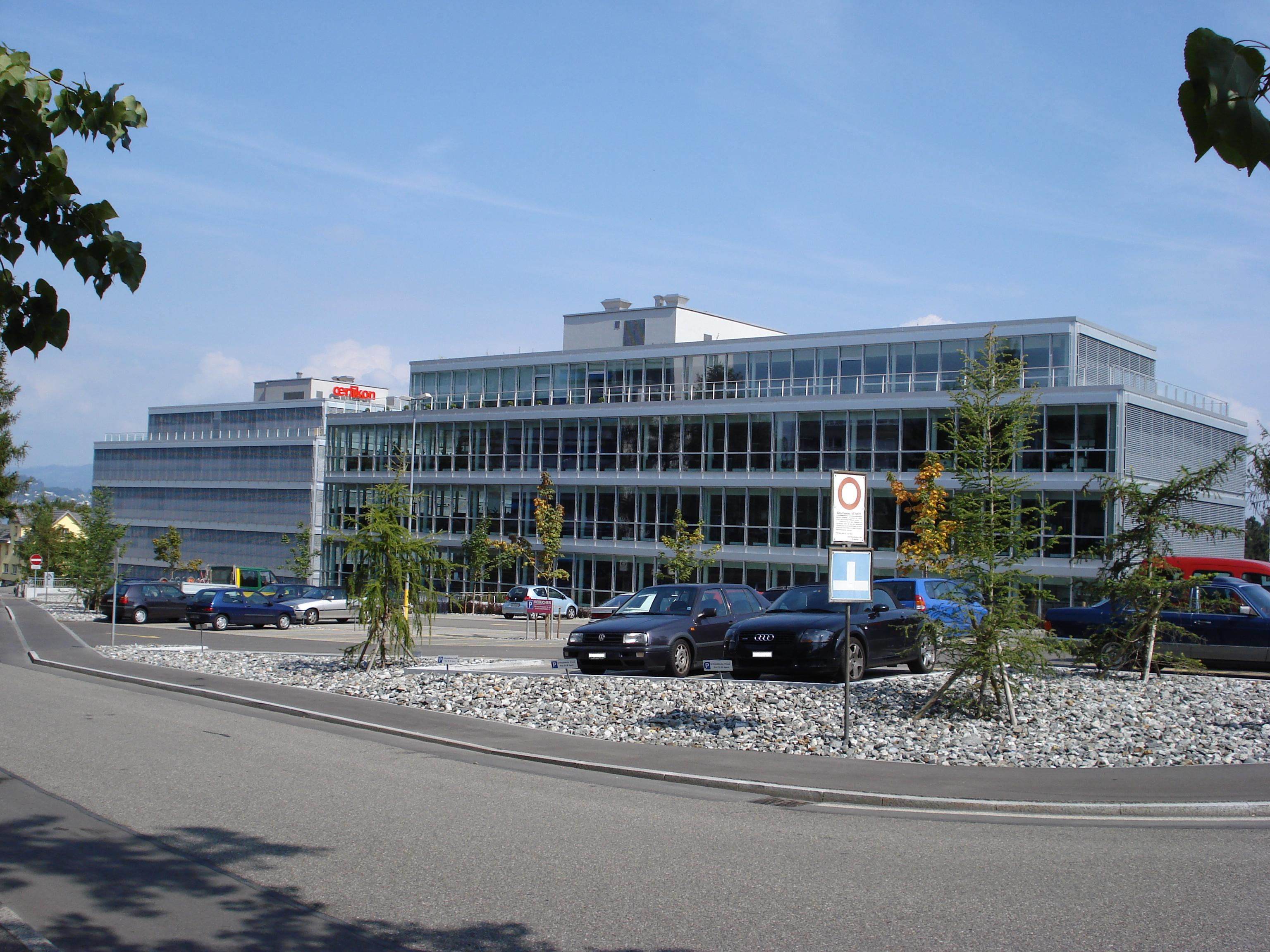
OC Oerlikon and LGT Group in Pfäffikon

Most of the canton relies on agriculture. The local breed of brown cattle, Braunvieh, is renowned. The textile industry used to be of great importance in the canton but has now almost ceased to exist; remnants are concentrated around the capital Schwyz. Located in the same area are many producers of fine furniture. There are a few large hydroelectric power plants in the canton.

Tourism is of importance in a number of regions, most notably in the centre of pilgrimage Einsiedeln. Einsiedeln is also a centre of winter sports. The mountain railways on the Rigi are well known around the country. Freienbach, in the north of the canton, is known for the lowest taxes in Switzerland. This has attracted a number of the rich.

The best known, worldwide product of the canton is the Swiss Army Knife manufactured by Victorinox in Ibach just downhill from the main town of Schwyz.

As of 2010, Schwyz had an unemployment rate of 2.3%. As of 2008, there were 4,723 people employed in the primary economic sector and about 1,789 businesses involved in this sector. 18,661 people were employed in the secondary sector and there were 1,937 businesses in this sector. 41,198 people were employed in the tertiary sector, with 6,207 businesses in this sector.

In 2008, the total number of full-time equivalent jobs was 53,451. The number of jobs in the primary sector was 2,939, of which 2,795 were in agriculture, 130 were in forestry or lumber production and 14 were in fishing or fisheries. The number of jobs in the secondary sector was 17,505 of which 10,048 or (57.4%) were in manufacturing, 88 or (0.5%) were in mining and 6,959 (39.8%) were in construction. The number of jobs in the tertiary sector was 33,007. In the tertiary sector; 8,708 or 26.4% were in the sale or repair of motor vehicles, 2,193 or 6.6% were in the movement and storage of goods, 3,376 or 10.2% were in a hotel or restaurant, 1,382 or 4.2% were in the information industry, 2,294 or 7.0% were the insurance or financial industry, 4,126 or 12.5% were technical professionals or scientists, 1,922 or 5.8% were in education and 4,504 or 13.6% were in health care.

Of the working population, 15.9% used public transport to get to work, and 56% used a private car.

== Transport ==
Regional rail within the canton of Schwyz and neighbouring areas is provided by Lucerne S-Bahn, Zug Stadtbahn and Zurich S-Bahn. The S27 service in the March District is not part of any network. Important junction stations with connections to long-distance trains are Arth-Goldau (also international trains), Biberbrugg and Pfäffikon SZ. Additionally, PostAuto and several other bus operators (e.g. Auto AG Schwyz) serve towns and villages within the canton. Rail and bus services operate mainly within the Schwyz tariff network, except for the northern part of the canton, which lie within the ZVV tariff network and Ostwind tariff network, respectively.

Several cable cars (e.g. the Rotenfluebahn) provide access to mountains. The Rigi Railways operates railway lines to the summit of Rigi. There are also two funiculars (Drahtseilbahn Schwyz–Stoos, Stoosbahn).

The ZSG operates boat cruises on Lake Zurich (including Obersee and Ufenau island), and the Lake Lucerne Navigation Company runs boats on Lake Lucerne (Vierwaldstättersee). The Autofähre Beckenried–Gersau is a car ferry across this lake. The Zugersee Schifffahrt operates boats on Lake Zug.

The nearest airport is Zurich Airport.

The canton is traversed by the A3 and A15 motorways in the north and the A4 motorway in the west. Mountain passes are Chatzenstrick Pass, Etzel Pass, Ibergeregg Pass, Kinzig Pass, Pragel Pass, Sattel Pass, and Sattelegg Pass.

== Religion ==
From the 2000 census, 92,868 or 72.2% were Roman Catholic, while 15,140 or 11.8% belonged to the Swiss Reformed Church. Of the rest of the population, there were 2,758 members of an Orthodox church (or about 2.14% of the population), there were 46 individuals (or about 0.04% of the population) who belonged to the Christian Catholic Church, and there were 2,658 individuals (or about 2.07% of the population) who belonged to another Christian church. There were 51 individuals (or about 0.04% of the population) who were Jewish, and 5,598 (or about 4.35% of the population) who were Islamic. There were 272 individuals who were Buddhist, 429 individuals who were Hindu and 62 individuals who belonged to another church. 6,331 (or about 4.92% of the population) belonged to no church, are agnostic or atheist, and 3,752 individuals (or about 2.92% of the population) did not answer the question.

== Education ==
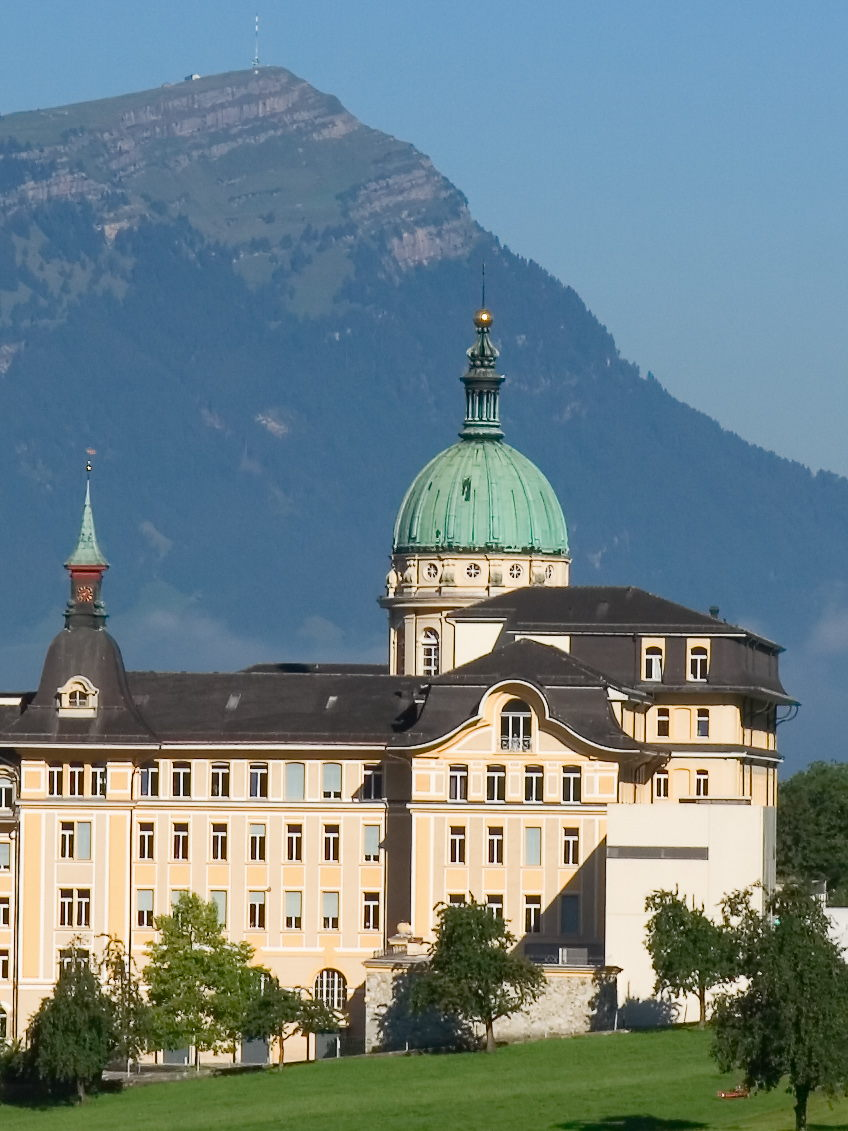
Kantonsschule Kollegium Schwyz, an upper Secondary school in Schwyz

In Schwyz about 46,694 or (36.3%) of the population have completed non-mandatory upper secondary education, and 13,848 or (10.8%) have completed additional higher education (either university or a Fachhochschule). Of the 13,848 who completed tertiary schooling, 66.3% were Swiss men, 19.4% were Swiss women, 9.1% were non-Swiss men and 5.2% were non-Swiss women.

Schwyz is home to the Kantonsschule Kollegium Schwyz (KKS), an upper secondary school that is a Gymnasium and a vocational or technical college. The KKS has operated for over 150 years, though it builds on several older schools. The first Latin school in Schwyz opened in 1627 in the former Capuchin monastery of St. Josef im Loo. This school remained open until the 1798 French invasion. On 25 July 1841, the Jesuits laid the cornerstone of what would become the Jesuit College on the site of the modern Kollegium. The school opened in 1844 but only remained under Jesuit control for three years. In 1847, Federal troops marched into Schwyz to suppress the Catholic Sonderbund and forced the Jesuits to flee. It was reopened in 1855 under the Capuchin Father Theodosius Florentini and in the following year began teaching students. The school continued to teach students using both religious and secular teachers until the 1970s. In 1972, the lower secondary students moved to Pfäffikon and the school became an upper secondary Kantonsschule.

== See also ==
- Theodor Ab Yberg – Swiss politician, head of the canton 1846–1847
- Erlenbach horse – Extinct horse breed in Switzerland
