= Sattel, Switzerland =

Sattel
- Municipality
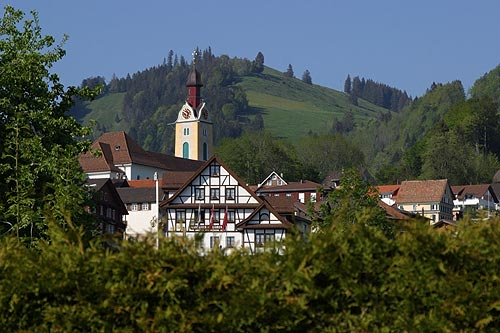

- Flag Coat of arms
- Location of Sattel
- Location within Switzerland Location within Canton of Schwyz
- Coordinates: 47°4′N 8°37′E
- Country: Switzerland
- Canton: Schwyz
- District: Schwyz

Area
  - Total: 17.3 km^{2} (6.7 sq mi)
- Elevation: 794 m (2,605 ft)

Population (December 2020)
  - Total: 1,925
  - Density: 111/km^{2} (288/sq mi)
- Time zone: UTC+01:00 (CET)
  - Summer (DST): UTC+02:00 (CEST)
- Postal code: 6417
- SFOS number: 1371
- ISO 3166 code: CH-SZ
- Localities: Ecce Homo, Schornen, Mostelberg
- Surrounded by: Oberägeri (ZG), Rothenthurm, Steinen, Steinerberg, Schwyz, Unterägeri (ZG)
- Website: www.sattel.ch

Sattel is a municipality in Schwyz District in the canton of Schwyz in Switzerland. Its name is the German word for "saddle".

== History ==
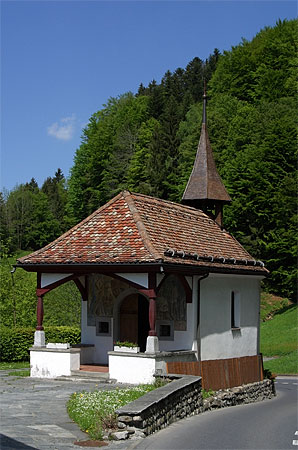
Battle of Morgarten Chapel

Aerial view (1948)

The Battle of Morgarten occurred on 15 November 1315 near Sattel, at Morgarten (now part of Oberägeri). It began when a Swiss Confederation force of 1,500 infantry archers ambushed a group of Austrian soldiers of the Holy Roman Empire near the Morgarten Pass. The Swiss, led by Werner Stauffacher, thoroughly defeated the Austrians, who were under the command of Duke Leopold I of Austria.

The Confederates prepared a road-block and an ambush at a point between Lake Aegeri and Morgarten pass where the small path led between the steep slope and a swamp. When about 1500 men attacked from above with rocks, logs and halberds, the knights had no room to defend themselves and suffered a crushing defeat, while the foot soldiers in the rear fled back to the city of Zug. A chronicler described the Confederates, unfamiliar with the customs of battles between knights, as brutally butchering everything that moved and everyone unable to flee. This founded the reputation of the Confederates as barbaric, yet fierce and respectable fighters.

Within a month of the battle, in December 1315, the Confederates renewed the oath of alliance made in 1291, initiating the phase of growth of the Old Swiss Confederacy. Within forty years, cities including Lucerne, Zug, Zürich and Bern had joined the confederation.

The victory of the Confederates left them in their virtual autonomy and gave them a breathing-space of some sixty years before the next Habsburg attack resulted in the Battle of Sempach (1386).

The French invasion of Switzerland in 1798 brought about a swift end of the Ancien Régime. The French victories against the larger cities of the Swiss Plateau led to the creation of the French supported Helvetic Republic on 12 April 1798. Following the declaration of the Republic, the Cantons of Uri, Schwyz and Nidwalden rejected it and raised an army to fight the French. Under Alois von Reding they were able to raise about 10,000 men. This army was deployed along the defensive line from Napf to Rapperswil. General Reding besieged French controlled Lucerne and marched across the Brünig Pass into the Berner Oberland to support the armies of Berne. At the same time, the French General Balthasar Alexis Henri Antoine of Schauenburg marched out of occupied Zürich to attack Zug, Lucerne and the Sattel Pass. Even though the Reding's army won victories at Rothenthurm and Morgarten, Schauenburg's victory near Sattel allowed him to threaten the town of Schwyz. On 4 May 1798, the town council of Schwyz surrendered.

== Geography ==
Sattel has an area, as of 2006, of 17.3 km^{2} (6.7 sq mi). Of this area, 55.7% is used for agricultural purposes, while 37.2% is forested. Of the rest of the land, 6.2% is settled (buildings or roads) and the remainder (0.9%) is non-productive (rivers, glaciers or mountains).

During the last ice age the Reussgletschter completely covered the valley where Sattel currently stands and had two spurs arms up Unterägeri and Äussere Altmatt (Rothenthurm).

== Demographics ==
Sattel has a population (as of 31 December 2020) of 1,925. As of 2007, 8.5% of the population was made up of foreign nationals. Over the last 10 years the population has grown at a rate of 18.5%. Most of the population (as of 2000) speaks German (97.3%), with English being second most common ( 0.5%) and Albanian being third ( 0.4%).

As of 2000 the gender distribution of the population was 51.4% male and 48.6% female. The age distribution, as of 2008, in Sattel is; 409 people or 29.2% of the population is between 0 and 19. 436 people or 31.1% are 20 to 39, and 360 people or 25.7% are 40 to 64. The senior population distribution is 118 people or 8.4% are 65 to 74. There are 62 people or 4.4% who are 70 to 79 and 17 people or 1.21% of the population who are over 80.

As of 2000 there are 503 households, of which 134 households (or about 26.6%) contain only a single individual. 51 or about 10.1% are large households, with at least five members.

In the 2007 election the most popular party was the SVP which received 54.7% of the vote. The next three most popular parties were the CVP (23.3%), the FDP (11.6%) and the SPS (7%).

In Sattel about 60.7% of the population (between age 25-64) have completed either non-mandatory upper secondary education or additional higher education (either university or a Fachhochschule).

Sattel has an unemployment rate of 0.69%. As of 2005, there were 183 people employed in the primary economic sector and about 60 businesses involved in this sector. 51 people are employed in the secondary sector and there are 12 businesses in this sector. 197 people are employed in the tertiary sector, with 49 businesses in this sector.

From the 2000 census, 1,205 or 85.9% are Roman Catholic, while 96 or 6.8% belonged to the Swiss Reformed Church. Of the rest of the population, and there are less than 5 individuals who belong to another Christian church. There are 9 (or about 0.64% of the population) who are Islamic. There are 6 individuals (or about 0.43% of the population) who belong to another church (not listed on the census), 44 (or about 3.14% of the population) belong to no church, are agnostic or atheist, and 41 individuals (or about 2.92% of the population) did not answer the question.

The historical population is given in the following table:

| year | population |
|---|---|
| 1950 | 997 |
| 1960 | 1,012 |
| 1970 | 1,065 |
| 1980 | 1,090 |
| 1985 | 1,133 |
| 1990 | 1,255 |
| 2000 | 1,400 |
| 2005 | 1,566 |
| 2007 | 1,618 |

== See also ==
- Sattel-Aegeri railway station
