= Joseph Thomas Fassbind =

Swiss pastor and historiographer (1755–1824)

Joseph Thomas Fassbind (1755–1824) was a pastor and historiographer of Schwyz.

He was educated at Einsiedeln, Bellinzona, Como and Besançon. In 1798, he was convicted of treason for his refusal to vow loyalty to the Helvetic Republic, and exiled to Engelberg monastery. He returned from exile in 1800 and became pastor of Schwyz in 1803.

Fassbind is best known for his vaterländische Profangeschichte, an account of the history of the canton of Schwyz from the Roman to the Napoleonic era, published posthumously in five volumes as Geschichte des Kantons Schwyz during the 1830s (a new edition with commentary appeared in 2005). Of particular interest are his eyewitness accounts of the events of the War of the Second Coalition during his own time. Fassbind's anti-French opinions led him to welcome the Russian invasion of the Helvetic Republic, and his description of the troops of Alexander Suvorov's army is decidedly favourable.

== Bibliography ==
- Schwyzer Geschichte, ed. Angela Dettling, 2005, ISBN 978-3-0340-0699-6.
