= Oberägeri =

- Municipality
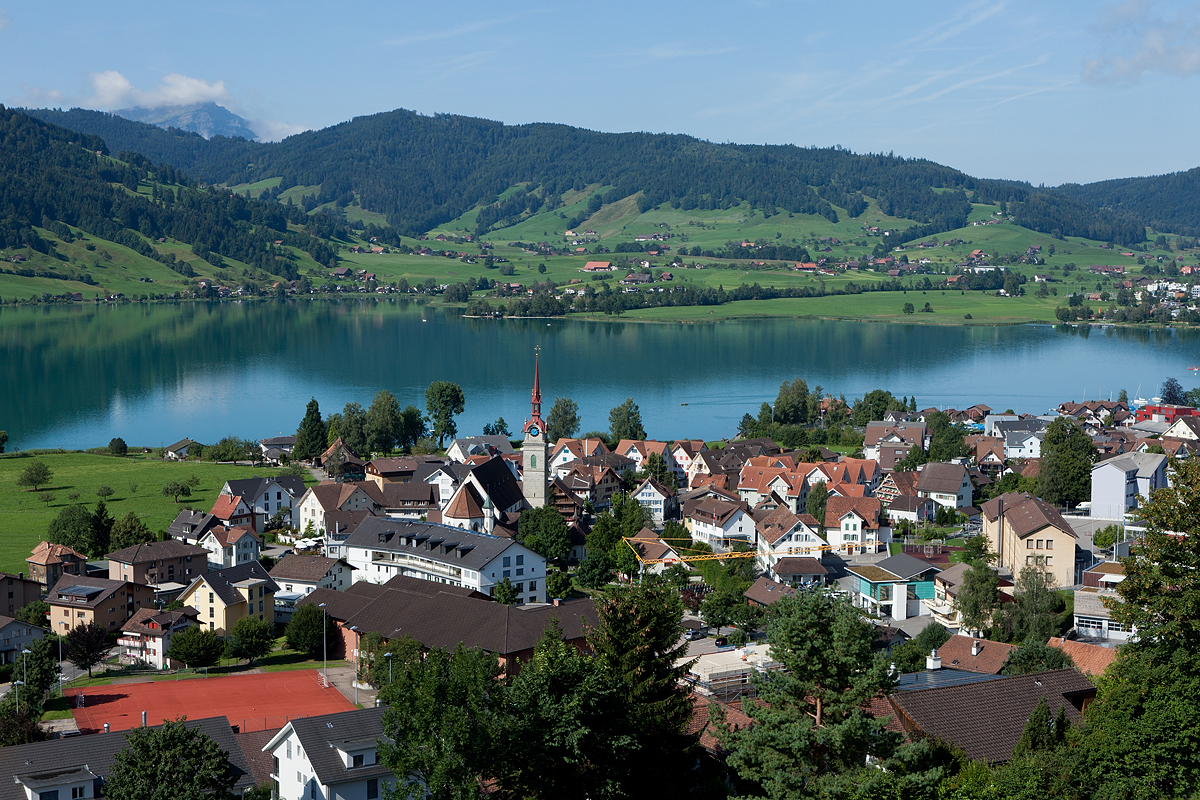

- Coat of arms
- Location of Oberägeri
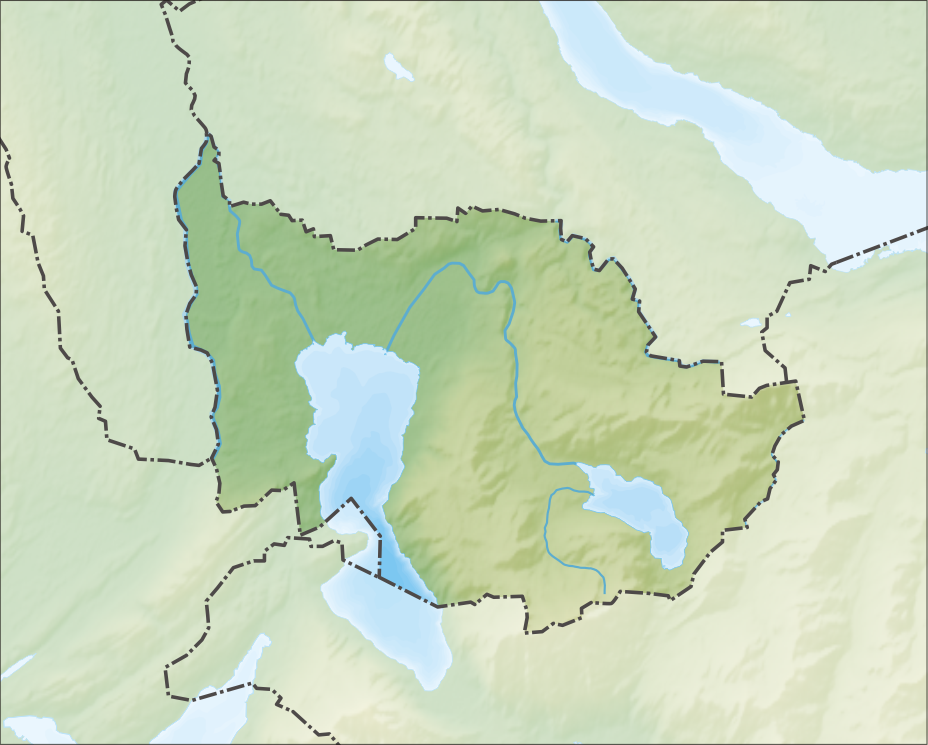
- Location within Switzerland Location within Canton of Zug
- Coordinates: 47°8′N 8°36′E
- Country: Switzerland
- Canton: Zug
- District: n.a.

Government
  - Mayor: Marcel Güntert

Area
  - Total: 36.2 km^{2} (14.0 sq mi)
- Elevation: 737 m (2,418 ft)

Population (December 2020)
  - Total: 6,382
  - Density: 176/km^{2} (457/sq mi)
- Time zone: UTC+01:00 (CET)
  - Summer (DST): UTC+02:00 (CEST)
- Postal code: 6315
- SFOS number: 1706
- ISO 3166 code: CH-ZG
- Surrounded by: Einsiedeln (SZ), Feusisberg (SZ), Hütten (ZH), Menzingen, Rothenthurm (SZ), Sattel (SZ), Unterägeri
- Website: www.oberaegeri.ch

Oberägeri, until 1798 simply known as Ägeri, is a municipality in the canton of Zug in Switzerland.

== History ==
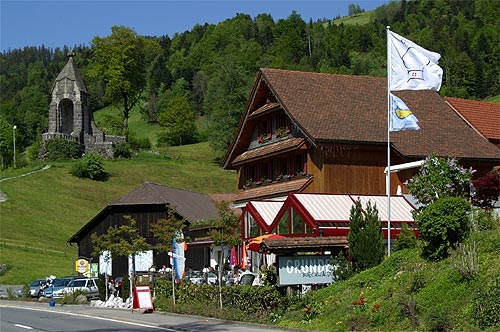
Monument to the Battle of Morgarten

Oberägeri first appears in historical documents in 1150 as Agregia. In 1538 it was mentioned as Ober Egere.

The first church in the valley was built in 876. After 1100, the land belonged to the monastery of Einsiedeln, and was influenced by the Battle of Morgarten.

The Battle of Morgarten occurred on 15 November 1315 at Morgarten (now part of Oberägeri) and near neighboring Sattel. It began when a Swiss Confederation force of 1,500 infantry archers, led by Werner Stauffacher, ambushed a group of Austrian soldiers of the Holy Roman Empire under the command of Duke Leopold I of Austria near the Morgarten Pass. The Swiss defeated the Austrians.

The Confederates prepared a road-block and an ambush at a point between Lake Aegeri and Morgarten Pass where a small path led between the steep slope and a swamp. When about 1500 men attacked from above with rocks, logs and halberds, the Austrian knights had no room to defend themselves and suffered a crushing defeat, while the foot soldiers in the rear fled back to the city of Zug. A chronicler described the Confederates, unfamiliar with the customs of battles between knights, as brutally butchering everything that moved and everyone unable to flee. This founded the reputation of the Confederates as barbaric, yet fierce and respectable fighters.

Within a month of the battle, in December 1315, the Confederates renewed the oath of alliance made in 1291, initiating the phase of growth of the Old Swiss Confederacy. Within forty years, cities including Lucerne, Zug, Zürich and Bern had joined the confederation.

The victory of the Confederates left them in virtual autonomy and gave them a breathing-space of some sixty years before the next Habsburg attack resulted in the Battle of Sempach (1386).

Aerial view (1947)

The municipality came into existence in the 15th century. Around 1500, several chapels and the first government building were built in Oberägeri. In 1669 the municipality gained the right to elect its own priest. In 1726 the church was burgled. In 1766 the governments of Oberägeri and Unterägeri (at the time known as Wilägeri) became involved in an open fight during local parliamentary sessions, and the two municipalities split in 1798.

In 1838 the city of Zürich stopped collecting interest they had had a right to since medieval times. In the same year the first school-building in the municipality was built. The second school was not built until 1956.

Water supplies were established in 1890 by a local pub landlord.

== Geography ==
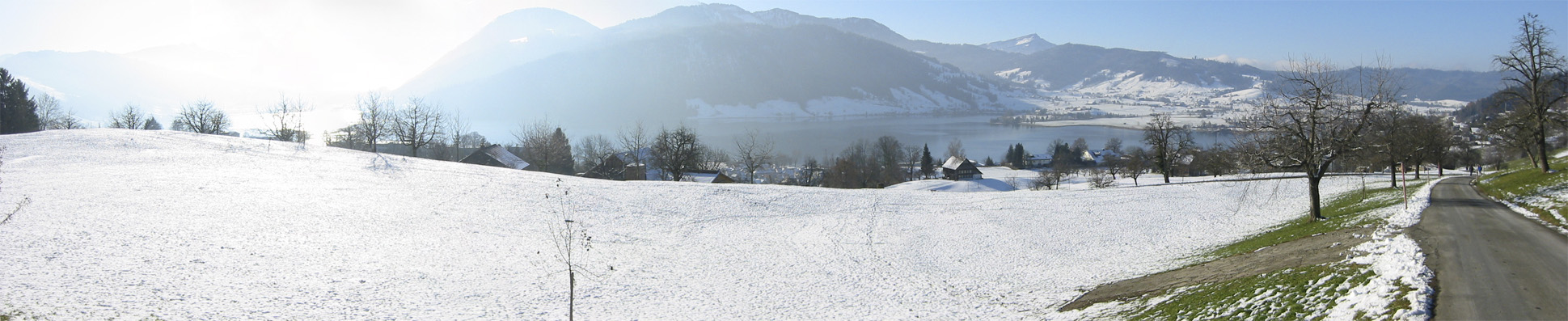
Winter in Oberägeri

Oberägeri has an area, as of 2009, of 36.2 km^{2} (14.0 sq mi). Of this area, 0.3 km^{2} (0.12 sq mi) or about 0.8% is occupied with buildings and 1.04 km^{2} (0.40 sq mi) or about 2.9% is roads or transportation infrastructure. About a third or 12.24 km^{2} (4.73 sq mi) is used for agriculture, while 0.71 km^{2} (0.27 sq mi) or about 2.0% is used for small gardens. Forests or other wooded areas cover 13.53 km^{2} (5.22 sq mi) or about 37.4% of the municipality. Of the rest, 6.33 km^{2} (2.44 sq mi) or about 17.5% is covered with water, including the Ägerisee, and 2.07 km^{2} (0.80 sq mi) or about 5.7% is marsh or moorland.

The municipality is located in the eastern pre-alpine, high valley on the northern shores of the Ägerisee at an elevation of about 724 m (2,375 ft). It consists of the village of Oberägeri and the hamlets of Morgarten/Hauptsee and Alosen (at an elevation of 897 m (2,943 ft)) as well as scattered farm houses.

== Demographics ==
Oberägeri has a population (as of 31 December 2020) of 6,382. As of 2007, 19.7% of the population was made up of foreign nationals. Over the last 10 years the population has grown at a rate of 14.1%. Most of the population (as of 2000) speaks German (90.2%), with English being second most common ( 2.6%) and Dutch being third ( 1.1%).

In the 2007 federal election the most popular party was the CVP which received 33% of the vote. The next three most popular parties were the SVP (32.3%), the FDP (18.1%) and the Green Party (12%).

In Oberägeri about 76.9% of the population (between age 25-64) have completed either non-mandatory upper secondary education or additional higher education (either university or a Fachhochschule).

Oberägeri has an unemployment rate of 1.14%. As of 2005, there were 251 people employed in the primary economic sector and about 90 businesses involved in this sector. 355 people are employed in the secondary sector and there are 44 businesses in this sector. 1,049 people are employed in the tertiary sector, with 198 businesses in this sector.

The historical population is given in the following table:

year	population
1660	789^{a}
1743	871^{a}
1798	1332^{a}
1850	1,807
1900	1,891
1950	2,453
2000	4,740

^a population for the entire municipality of Ägeri 1660 (1'413); 1743 (1'519); 1798 (2'238).
