= Theodor Ab Yberg =

Swiss politician

Johann Theodor Kaspar Rudolph Ambros Alois Xaver Ab Yberg or more compactly Theodor Ab Yberg (8 December 1795, Schwyz - 30 November 1869) was a Swiss statesman.

Theodor was the son of alderman Alois Xaver Ab Yberg and his wife Maria Anna von Reding. He served in the Swiss Guard in Paris, but returned home in 1823. After having been member of the cantonal court, he was elected alderman in 1826. In 1830 he became governour of the Schwyz district and as well the canton.

In a dispute between the outer districts of Schwyz who demanded equal rights under the Constitution and the old lands, he fervently vindicated the supremacy of the latter. As a result, he gained the esteem of his fellow countrymen. When the council decided to occupy Küssnacht in the then existing district Schwyz outer lands in August 1833, Ab Yberg was the leading commander of the troops. However, the assault failed, as did a simultaneous from Basel, and he subsequently forfeited his military rank of colonel.

As a result of the attack on Küssnacht, the canton Schwyz was occupied by the confederate Swiss army. On 11 October 1833, it was reunited with the outer Schwyz under equal rights in the constitution. On 3 November, Ab Yberg was reelected head of the district council, and in 1834, 1838, 1842 and 1846 head of the canton (Landammann).

On 26 September 1847 he was elected main commandant of the Schwyz troops. With the fall of the Sonderbund, a special alliance between seven Swiss cantons, he disappeared from the political scene. In 1852, he was once more elected into the cantonal council, but could not keep up with the political changes. He retired soon thereafter and went to exile in Austria.

== Sources ==
- Allgemeine Deutsche Biographie - online version at Wikisource
- Franz Auf der Maur: "Theodor Ab Yberg" in German, French and Italian in the online Historical Dictionary of Switzerland.
