= Sattel Pass =

Mountain pass in Schwyz, Switzerland

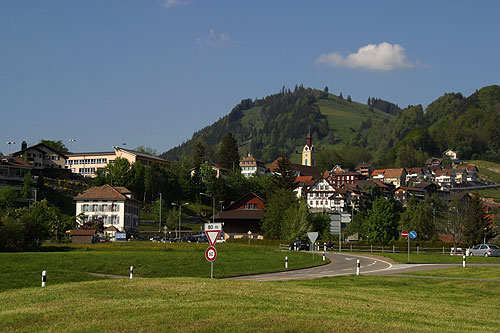
- Sattel Pass
- Interactive map of Sattel Pass
- Elevation: 932 metres (3,058 ft)

Third Approach
- Location: Switzerland
- Range: Alps
- Coordinates: 47°5′46″N 8°40′15″E

Sattel Pass (el. 932 m.) is a mountain pass in the canton of Schwyz in Switzerland.

It connects Pfäffikon and Seewen.

The pass was in use as early as the 13th century as an access route to the St. Gotthard Pass. The road was built in 1860, and along with the railway line to Arth, it has become one of the most important east–west arteries in central Switzerland.

== See also ==
- List of the highest paved roads in Europe
- List of mountain passes
