= Natur- und Tierpark Goldau =

Zoo in Goldau, Switzerland

Coordinates: 47.0503°N 8.5531°E

Natur- und Tierpark Goldau is one of six scientifically managed zoos in Switzerland. It is situated in the area that was devastated by the Goldau landslide of 1806. The zoo attracted 859,000 visitors in 2013.

== History ==
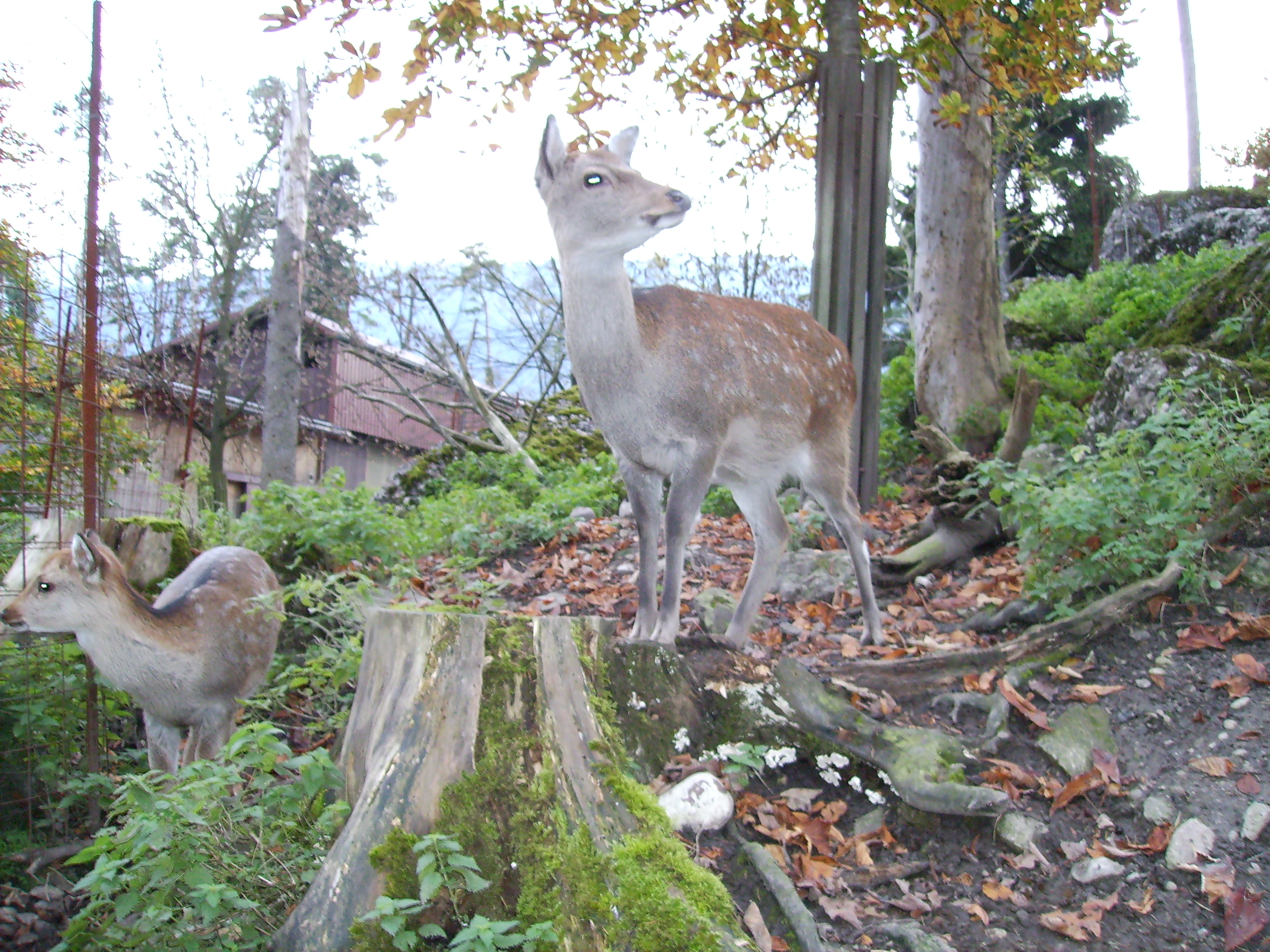
Deer in the park

On 2 September 1806, huge masses of rock fell off the mountain called Rossberg and interred the village of Goldau. 457 people lost their lives. More than 200 years after, some traces of the catastrophe are still visible. The forest area between the rebuilt town and Lake Lauerz contains numerous rocks that are superimposed one on the other.

In the early 1920s some animal lovers decided to establish a park for animals and nature amidst this wild landscape. An association called Tierparkverein Goldau was founded in 1925 and an area for the animal park and bird sanctuary was delimited. The association had a scarce amount of funds, its members therefore made many installations on socage. From the beginning, they wanted it to be an animal park for endemic mammals and birds. Soon after the opening, the park got a pair of Alpine ibex from a park in St. Gallen. Red, fallow and sika deer came later in addition.

In 1999, hurricane Lothar destroyed 80 percent of the forest and vastly damaged the compounds. With the help of local residents, donations and subsidies by the Canton of Schwyz the damage was removed with a low financial burden for the zoo.

== Attractions ==
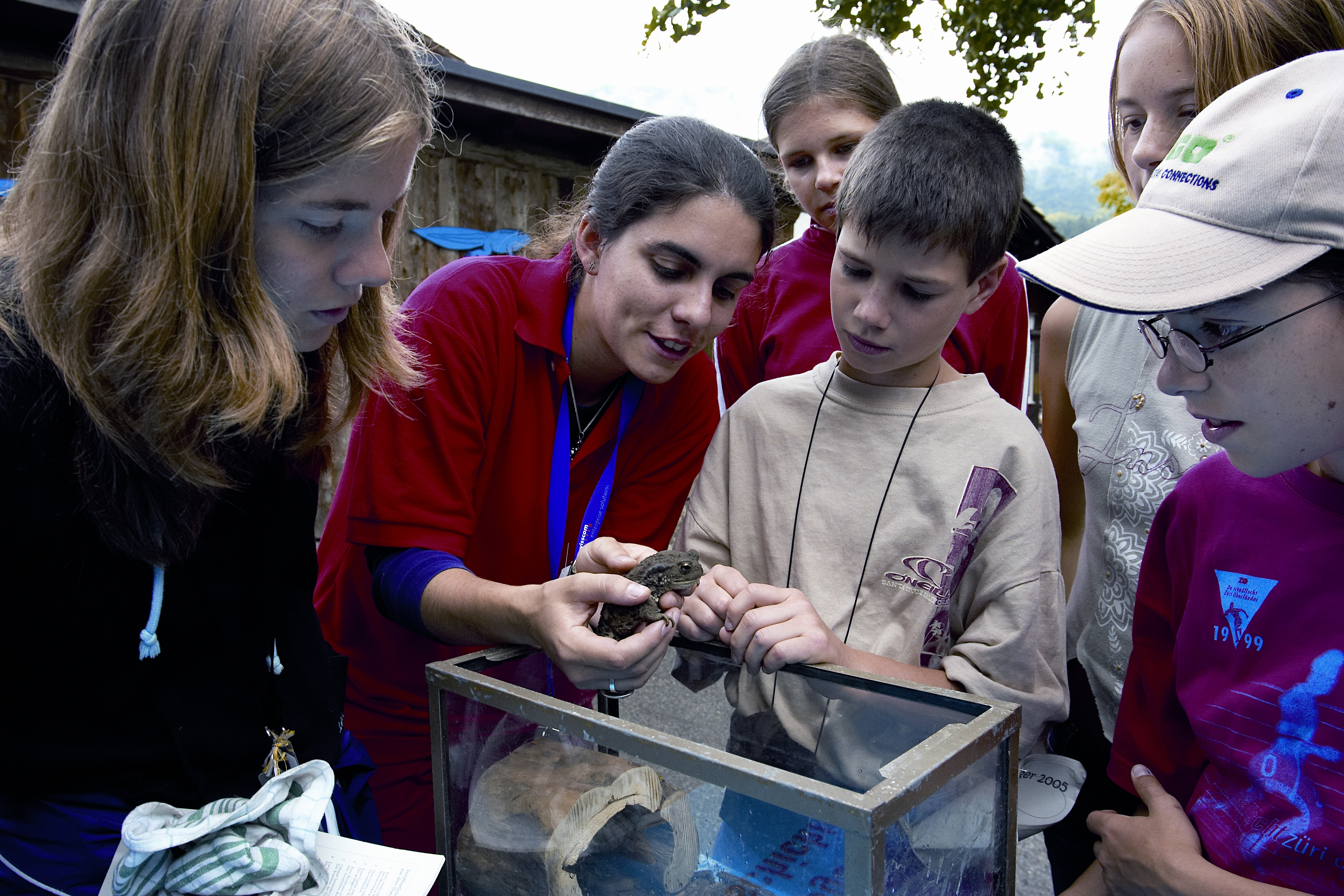
Pupils observe a common toad.

The park in Goldau still focusses on the endemic and European fauna. In the large, freely walkable area visitors can interact with sika deer, fallow deer and mouflons. The feeding of these animals is allowed. The park rears rare mammals and birds as part of the European Endangered Species Programme, including Syrian brown bears, European bisons and Northern bald ibises. Especially noteworthy is the international species programme for bearded vultures.

Natur- und Tierpark Goldau runs a school inside the park where zoo pedagogues and park rangers offer workshops for school classes and guided tours for schools and visitor groups to the animals. The rangers offer for example commentated feedings of bears, cormorants and wild boars. They also work as informants for individual visitors doing a walkabout.

== Expansion ==
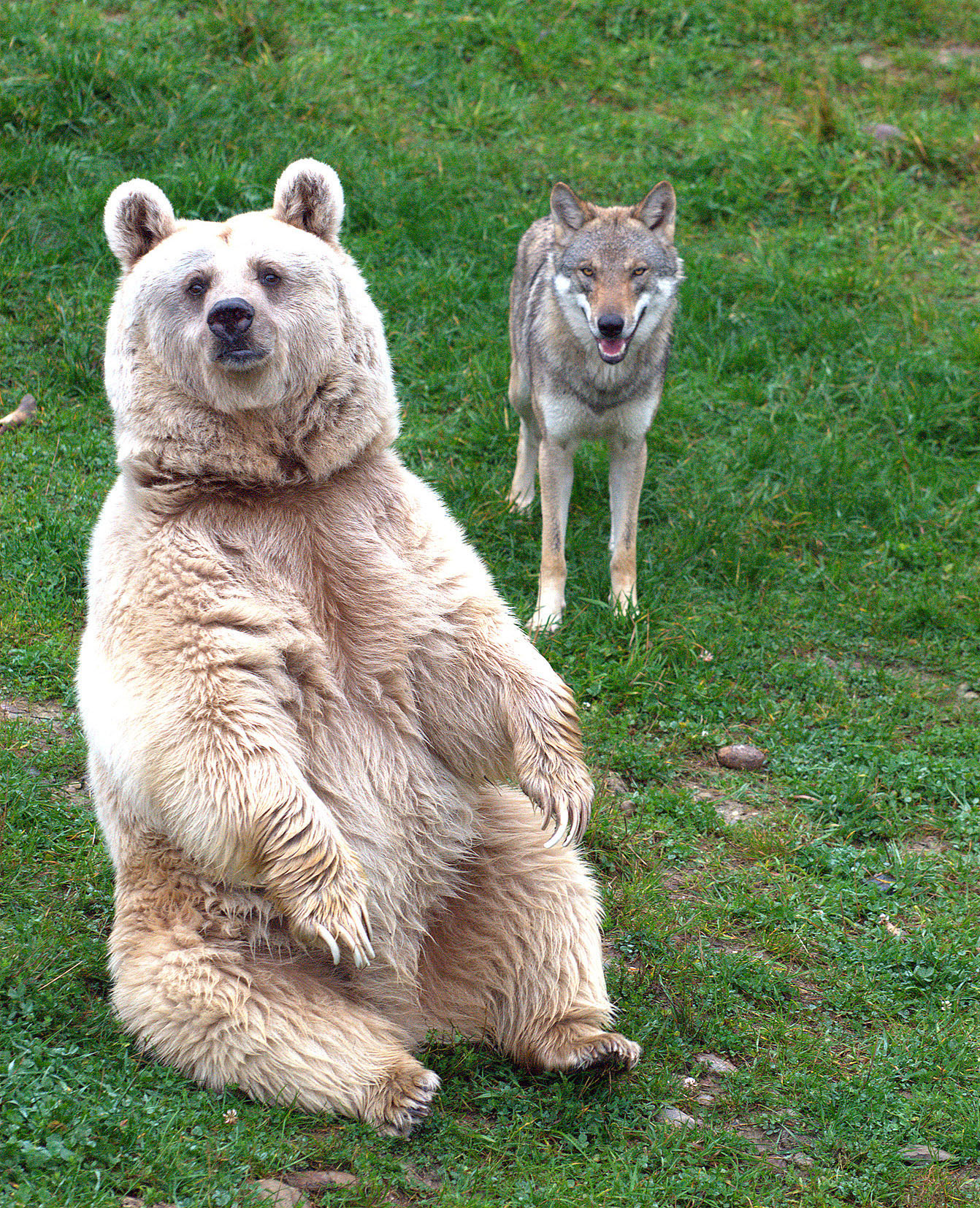
A Syrian brown bear and a gray wolf coexisting in the park

The surface of the animal park has recently been expanded from 17 to 34 hectares. Additionally to the original park area containing a forest and a lake it now contains land on the other side of a road. Visitors bridge the road on a 70 metres wide wildlife crossing. It was the main feature of the first expansion stage, which cost 13 million Swiss francs and was finished in 2004. In the area called Grosswiyer at the foot of the Rossberg mountain, the park opened a large site for both gray wolves and brown bears. This attraction was opened on 27 June 2009.

Other plans for the expansion included beaver lodges, vivariums, a site for phasianidae, an amphibian biotope as well as a farm with rare domestic animals. A previously artificial creekbed has been restored and revitalized. This measure allows a „reconquest“ of the stretch of water by flora and fauna in the Grosswiyer park area.

== Organisation ==
The operations of Natur- und Tierpark Goldau are run by an association with currently around 22,000 members. A foundation is backing the long-term existence of the zoo and is its proprietor. It is responsible for the earmarked attribution of bequests and large donations under supervision of the Swiss Confederation. The association and the foundation form together the umbrella organisation of the park that joined the World Association of Zoos and Aquariums.
