= Windegg =

Windegg ("windy ridge") is a frequent Swiss toponym, among other instances referring to:

- the County of Windegg (now part of the Swiss canton of St. Gallen)
- Windegg, Aeschi bei Spiez
- Windegg, Amden
- Windegg, Arosa
- Windegg, Bad Ragaz
- Windegg, Bauma
- Windegg, Bönigen
- Windegg, Chur
- Windegg, Dallenwil
- Windegg, Einsiedeln
- Windegg, Eschlikon
- Windegg, Freienbach
- Alp Windegg, Gersau
- Windegg, Glarus Süd
- Windegg, Gonten
- Windegg, Gossau SG
- Windegg, Grindelwald
- Windegg, Guttannen
- Windegg, Hergiswil
- Windegg, Herisau
- Windegg, Herrliberg
- Windegg, Illgau
- Windegg, Innertkirchen
- Windegg, Jonschwil
- Windegg, Küssnacht
- Windegg, Langnau am Albis
- Windegg, Lauerz
- Windegg, Lichtensteig
- Windegg, Maienfeld
- Windegg, Mels
- Windegg, Muotathal
- Windegg, Nesslau
- Windegg, Oberiberg
- Windegg, Pfäfers
- Windegg, Rapperswil-Jona
- Windegg, Schaffhausen
- Windegg Castle, Schänis
- Windegg, Schiers
- Windegg, Schwende District
- Windegg, Sevelen
- Windegg, Silenen
- Windegg, St. Margrethen
- Windegg, Unterägeri
- Windegg, Urnäsch
- Alp Windegg, Vilters-Wangs
- Windegg, Vitznau
- Windegg, Vorderthal
- Herrensitz Windegg in Wald ZH
- Windegg, Wattwil
- Windegg, Wildhaus-Alt St. Johann
- Windegg, Wittenbach
- Windegg, Wolfenschiessen

== See also ==
- Wind egg (disambiguation)
