= Steinen, Switzerland =

Steinen
- Municipality
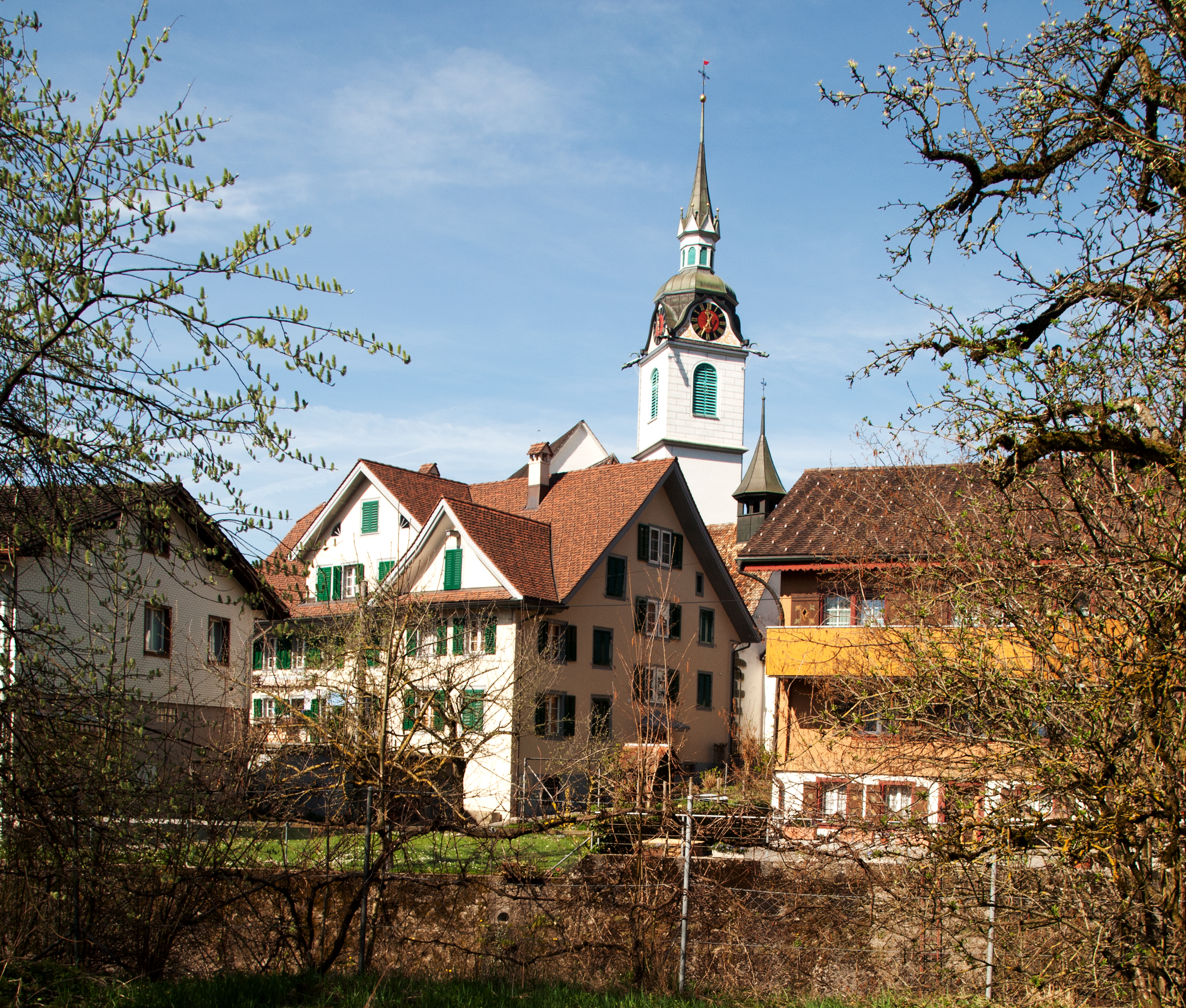

- Coat of arms
- Location of Steinen
- Location within Switzerland Location within Canton of Schwyz
- Coordinates: 47°3′N 8°36′E
- Country: Switzerland
- Canton: Schwyz
- District: Schwyz

Area
  - Total: 11.80 km^{2} (4.56 sq mi)
- Elevation: 474 m (1,555 ft)

Population (December 2020)
  - Total: 3,624
  - Density: 307.1/km^{2} (795.4/sq mi)
- Time zone: UTC+01:00 (CET)
  - Summer (DST): UTC+02:00 (CEST)
- Postal code: 6422
- SFOS number: 1373
- ISO 3166 code: CH-SZ
- Surrounded by: Arth, Lauerz, Sattel, Steinerberg, Schwyz
- Website: www.steinen.ch

Steinen (German pronunciation: [ˈʃtaɪnən]) is a municipality in Schwyz District in the canton of Schwyz in Switzerland.

== Geography ==
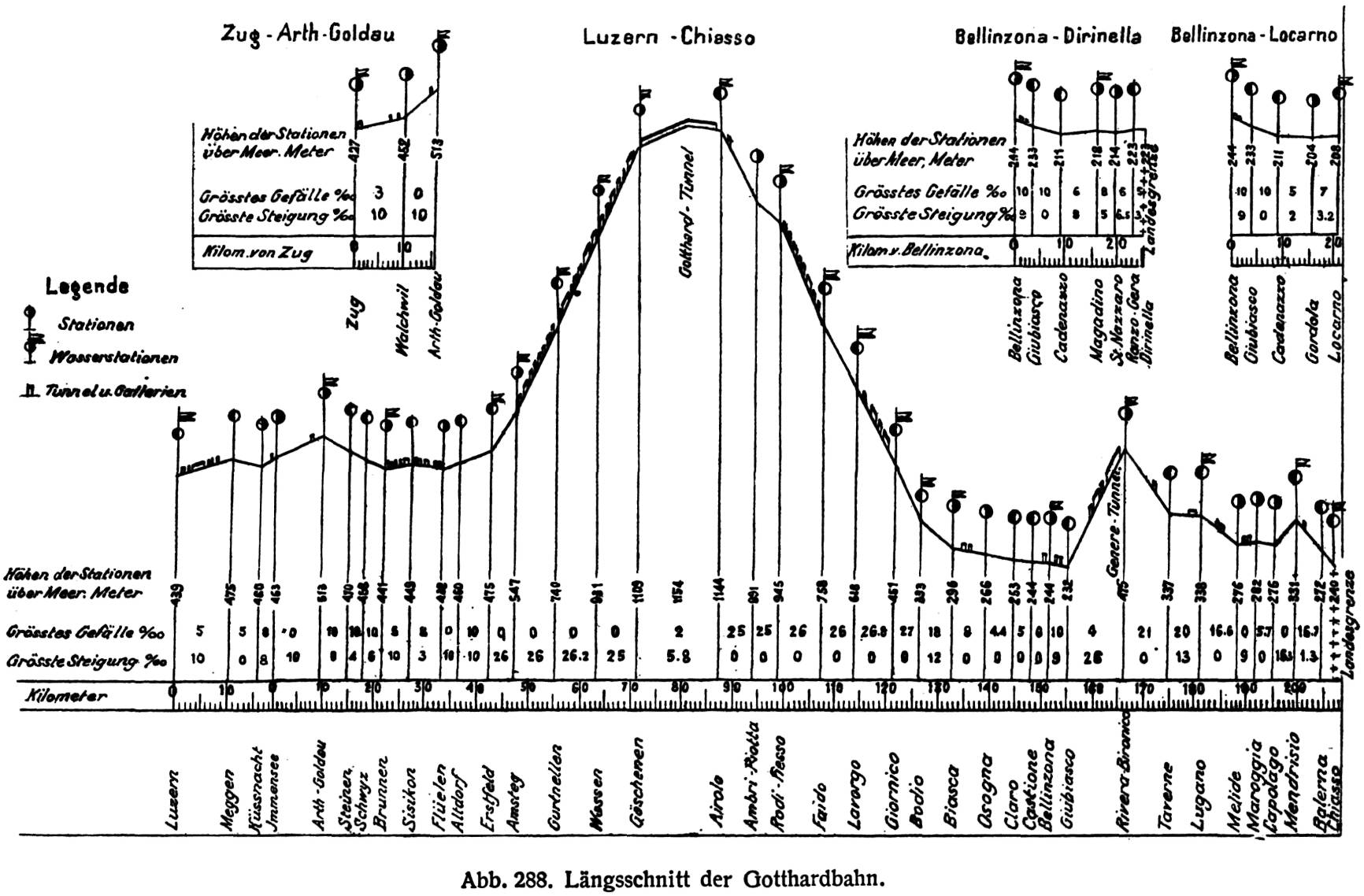
Gotthard Tunnel and rail line elevation map. The Gotthard line runs through Steinen

Aerial view (1963)

Steinen has an area, as of 2006, of 11.9 km^{2} (4.6 sq mi). Of this area, 52.7% is used for agricultural purposes, while 22.1% is forested. Of the rest of the land, 10.5% is settled (buildings or roads) and the remainder (14.6%) is non-productive (rivers, glaciers or mountains).

It is located between Rossberg and Lake Lauerz.

== Demographics ==
Steinen has a population (as of 31 December 2020) of 3,624. As of 2007, 7.6% of the population was made up of foreign nationals. Over the last 10 years the population has grown at a rate of 11.8%. Most of the population (as of 2000) speaks German (94.6%), with Italian being second most common ( 1.7%) and Serbo-Croatian being third ( 1.1%).

As of 2000 the gender distribution of the population was 50.8% male and 49.2% female. The age distribution, as of 2008, in Steinen is; 801 people or 28.9% of the population is between 0 and 19. 914 people or 32.9% are 20 to 39, and 746 people or 26.9% are 40 to 64. The senior population distribution is 188 people or 6.8% are 65 to 74. There are 87 people or 3.1% who are 70 to 79 and 39 people or 1.41% of the population who are over 80.

As of 2000 there are 1,033 households, of which 269 households (or about 26.0%) contain only a single individual. 95 or about 9.2% are large households, with at least five members.

In the 2007 election the most popular party was the SVP which received 39.9% of the vote. The next three most popular parties were the CVP (32.7%), the SPS (13.3%) and the FDP (8.9%).

In Steinen about 68.6% of the population (between age 25-64) have completed either non-mandatory upper secondary education or additional higher education (either university or a Fachhochschule).

Steinen has an unemployment rate of 1.1%. As of 2005, there were 177 people employed in the primary economic sector and about 65 businesses involved in this sector. 326 people are employed in the secondary sector and there are 32 businesses in this sector. 396 people are employed in the tertiary sector, with 75 businesses in this sector.

From the 2000 census, 2,291 or 82.6% are Roman Catholic, while 233 or 8.4% belonged to the Swiss Reformed Church. Of the rest of the population, there are less than 5 individuals who belong to the Christian Catholic faith, there are 21 individuals (or about 0.76% of the population) who belong to the Orthodox Church, and there are 16 individuals (or about 0.58% of the population) who belong to another Christian church. There are 61 (or about 2.20% of the population) who are Islamic. There are less than 5 individuals who belong to another church (not listed on the census), 84 (or about 3.03% of the population) belong to no church, are agnostic or atheist, and 64 individuals (or about 2.31% of the population) did not answer the question.

The historical population is given in the following table:

year	population
1950	1,751
1960	1,918
1970	2,131
1980	2,052
1985	2,202
1990	2,410
2000	2,788
2005	3,004
2007	3,041
