= Windeck (disambiguation) =

Windeck may refer to:

== Geography ==
- Windeck, municipality in the county of Rhein-Sieg-Kreis in North Rhine-Westphalia, Germany
- Windeck (Eibingen), settlement above the Rüdesheim village of Eibingen in Hesse, Germany

== Castles and palaces ==
- a ruined castle near Burgebrach (Steigerwald) in Bavaria, Germany
- Windeck Castle (Bühl), ruins near Bühl, Baden, Germany
- Windeck Castle (Heidesheim), in Heidesheim am Rhein in Rhenish Hesse, Germany
- New Windeck Castle, in Lauf (Baden), Baden-Württemberg, Germany
- Windeck Castle (Neidlingen), dilapidated castle near Neidlingen, Baden-Württemberg, Germany
- a palace, called Bürgle, in Niederzell on the island of Reichenau
- a palace in Ottrott im Lower Alsace
- Windegg Castle, ruins near Schwertberg, province of Perg in the Mühlviertel, Upper Austria
- Windeck Castle (Sieg), ruins in Windeck, North Rhine-Westphalia, Germany
- Windeck Castle (Weinheim), ruins in Weinheim

== People ==
- Agnes Windeck (1888–1975), pseudonym of the German actress, Agnes Sophie Windel
- Henry of Berg, Lord of Windeck (d 1295), vassal of the Landgrave of Thuringia

== Others ==
- Windeck (Black Forest), 1,209-metre-high (3,967 ft) mountain in the southern Black Forest, Germany
- Windeck (TV series), an Angolan telenovela

== See also ==
- Windegg (disambiguation)
