= Theresianum (disambiguation) =

Theresianum is a name that is used for a number of institutions in several countries, including the following.

Austria:

- Theresianum (or Theresian Academy), a private school in Vienna
- Theresian Military Academy, a military academy in Wiener Neustadt
- A high school in Eisenstadt

Germany:

- A Gymnasium devoted to the humanities in Bamberg
- A state-recognized all-day Gymnasium in Mainz

Romania:

- A large building complex in the suburbs of Hermannstadt that was used in the forced migrations of 1754

Switzerland:

- A high school for girls in Ingenbohl
