= Schwanau =

Schwanau may refer to

- Schwanau, Baden-Württemberg, a town in the district of Ortenau in Baden-Württemberg in Germany
- Schwanau, Schwyz, an island in Lake Lauerz in the canton of Schwyz in Switzerland
