= Schwanau, Schwyz =

Island

Coordinates: 47.03256°N 8.59760°E

Schwanau
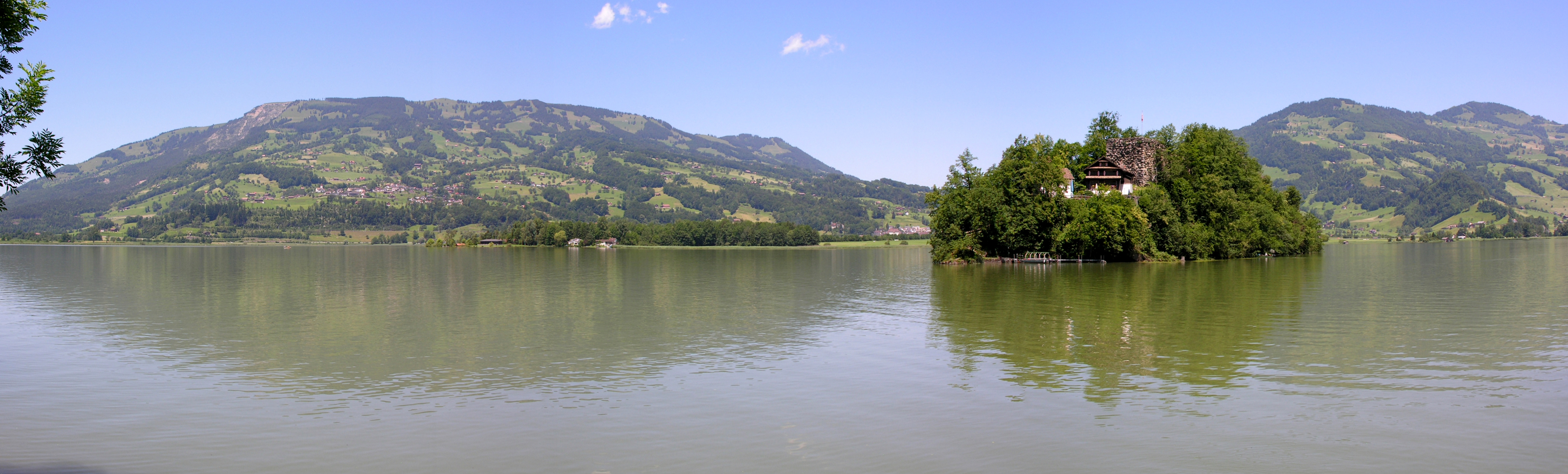
- View of the island from south side of the lake

Geography
- Location: Lake Lauerz
- Highest elevation: 469 m (1539 ft)

Administration
- Switzerland
- Canton: Schwyz
- District: Schwyz

Schwanau is an island in Lake Lauerz, located in the canton of Schwyz in Central Switzerland. It is occupied by a ruined castle, the Burgruine Schwanau, a chapel and a restaurant. Administratively the island lies within the municipality of Lauerz, but it is owned by the canton of Schwyz.

The island is situated some 125 m (410.1 ft) off the south shore of the lake, close to the lakeside village of Lauerz. Its highest point is 22 metres (72.2 ft) above normal lake level or 469 metres (1,538.7 ft) above sea level. It is the largest of the two islands in Lake Lauerz (the other being Roggenburg).

The island is accessible by a public passenger ferry from the nearby shore. Access for persons with limited mobility is possible by use of a specially adapted boat and an inclined elevator to the terrace level where the castle, chapel and restaurant are located.

== History ==
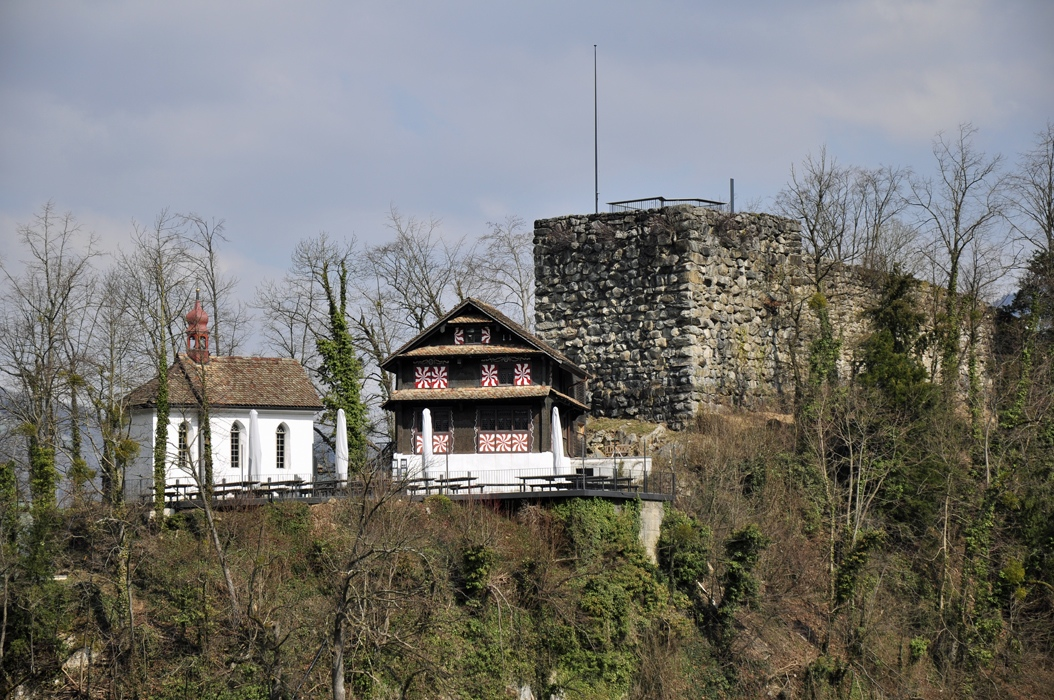
Chapel, restaurant and castle

Aerial view (1960)

Traces of occupation on the island date back to around 1200 BC. There is little documentary evidence relating to the castle, but it is believed to have been built at the end of the 12th century and to have been ruined, probably as a result of a fire, as early as the middle of the 13th century.

The island in known to have been occupied by hermits at various times, including the 17th and 18th centuries. In 1684 a chapel was built on the island, but this was destroyed by the tsunami that followed the 1806 Goldau landslide. In 1808 the council of the church in Schwyz sold the island to General Ludwig Auf der Maur on the provision that he rebuild the chapel. The island remained in the possession of the general's descendants until 1967, when it was purchased by the canton of Schwyz. In 2009 it was completely renovated.

== See also ==
- List of islands of Switzerland
