= Steinerberg =

- Municipality
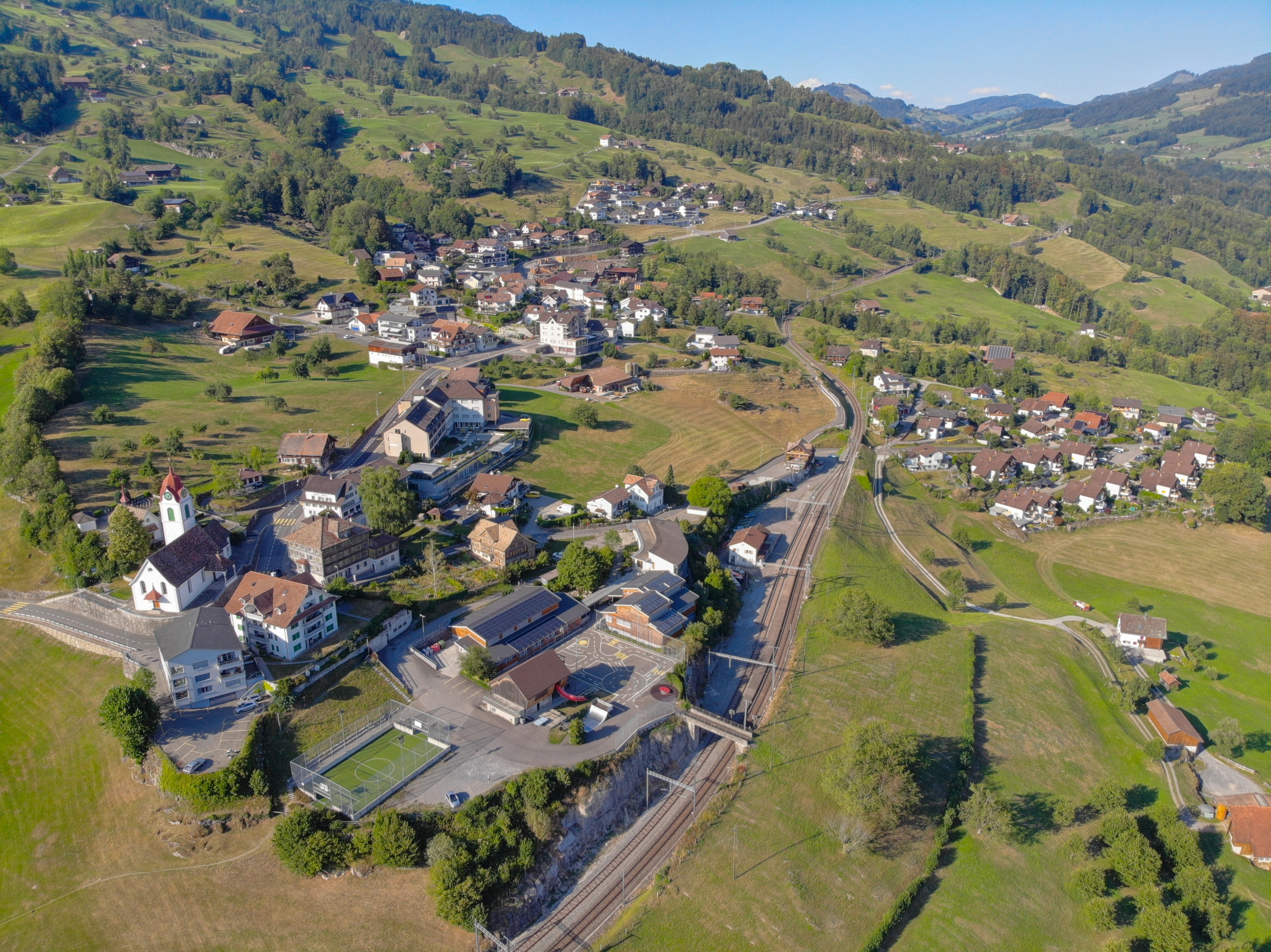

- Coat of arms
- Location of Steinerberg
- Location within Switzerland Location within Canton of Schwyz
- Coordinates: 47°3′N 8°35′E
- Country: Switzerland
- Canton: Schwyz
- District: Schwyz

Area
  - Total: 6.9 km^{2} (2.7 sq mi)
- Elevation: 625 m (2,051 ft)

Population (December 2020)
  - Total: 953
  - Density: 140/km^{2} (360/sq mi)
- Time zone: UTC+01:00 (CET)
  - Summer (DST): UTC+02:00 (CEST)
- Postal code: 6416
- SFOS number: 1374
- ISO 3166 code: CH-SZ
- Surrounded by: Arth, Lauerz, Sattel, Steinen, Unterägeri (ZG), Zug (ZG)
- Website: https://www.steinerberg.ch

Steinerberg is a municipality in Schwyz District in the canton of Schwyz in Switzerland.

== Geography ==
Aerial view (1953)

Steinerberg has an area, as of 2006, of 6.9 km^{2} (2.7 sq mi). Of this area, 62.7% is used for agricultural purposes, while 31.8% is forested. Of the rest of the land, 5.2% is settled (buildings or roads) and the remainder (0.3%) is non-productive (rivers, glaciers or mountains).

== Demographics ==
Steinerberg has a population (as of 31 December 2020) of 953. As of 2007, 6.3% of the population was made up of foreign nationals. Over the last 10 years the population has decreased at a rate of -3.5%. Most of the population (as of 2000) speaks German (95.1%), with Serbo-Croatian being second most common ( 1.3%) and Albanian being third ( 0.9%).

As of 2000 the gender distribution of the population was 51.3% male and 48.7% female. The age distribution, as of 2008, in Steinerberg was:

age	count	%
0–19	267	29.8
20–39	265	29.6
40–64	228	25.4
65–74	53	5.7
70–79	53	5.9
>80	32	3.6

As of 2000 there were 272 households, of which 52 households (or about 19.1%) contained only a single individual. 27 or about 9.9% were large households with at least five members.

In the 2007 election the most popular party was the SVP which received 52.6% of the vote. The next three most popular parties were the CVP (25.2%), the FDP (11.5%) and the SPS (7.9%).

In Steinerberg about 61.5% of the population (between age 25–64) had completed either non-mandatory upper secondary education or additional higher education (either university or a Fachhochschule).

Steinerberg has an unemployment rate of 0.73%. As of 2005, there were 122 people employed in the primary economic sector and about 45 businesses involved in this sector. 59 people were employed in the secondary sector and there were 13 businesses in this sector. 115 people were employed in the tertiary sector, with 14 businesses in this sector.

From the 2000 census, 719 or 80.2% were Roman Catholic, while 54 or 6.0% belonged to the Swiss Reformed Church. Of the rest of the population, there were 14 individuals (or about 1.56% of the population) who belonged to the Orthodox Church, and there were less than 5 individuals who belonged to another Christian church. There were 23 (or about 2.57% of the population) who were Islamic. There were less than 5 individuals who belonged to another church (not listed on the census), 44 (or about 4.91% of the population) belonged to no church, were agnostic or atheist, and 40 individuals (or about 4.46% of the population) did not answer the question.

The historical population is given in the following table:

year	population
1950	445
1960	446
1970	518
1980	526
1985	588
1990	690
2000	860
2005	890
2007	875

== See also ==
- Steinerberg railway station
