= Emmetten =

- Municipality
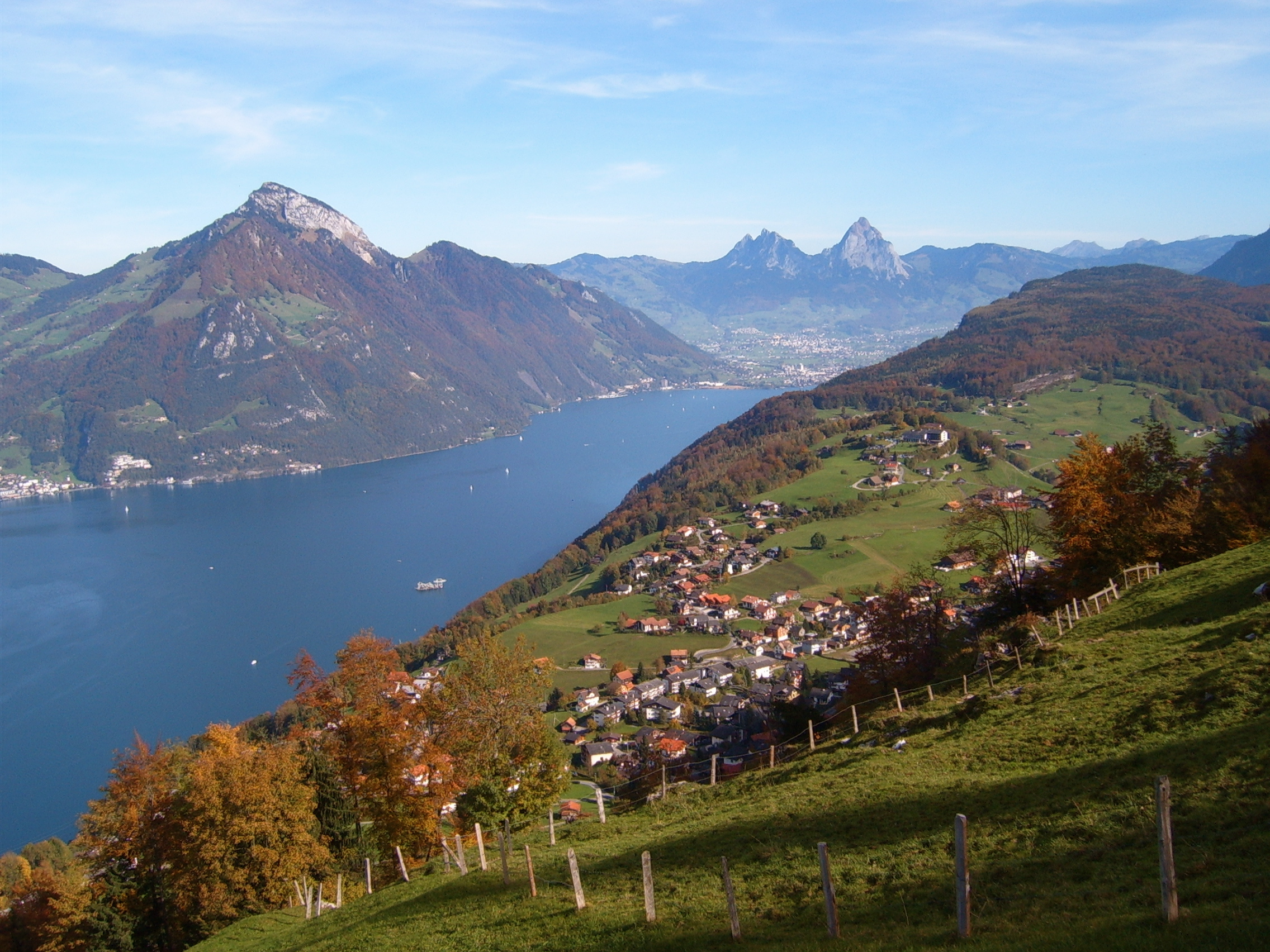

- Flag Coat of arms
- Location of Emmetten
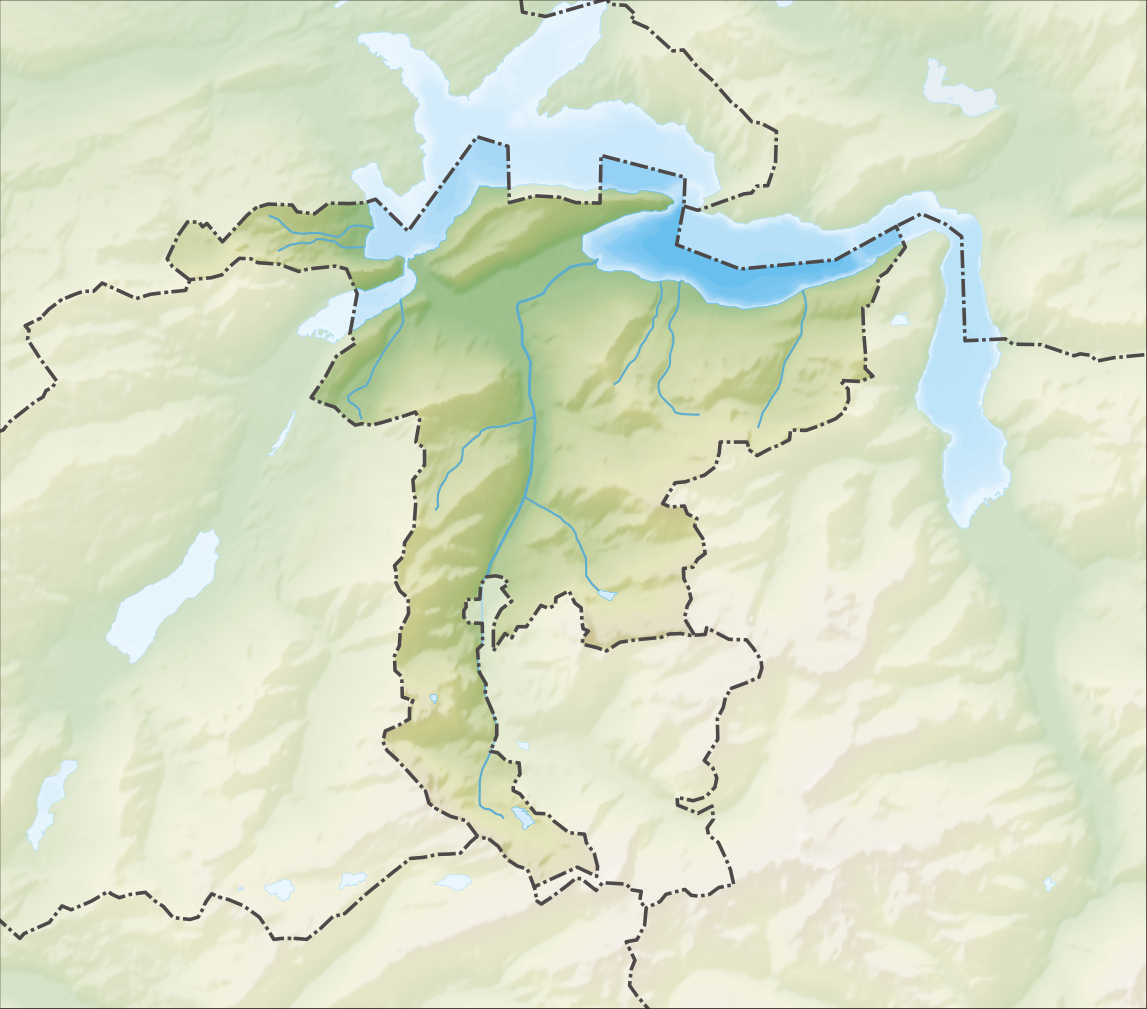
- Location within Switzerland Location within Canton of Nidwalden
- Coordinates: 46°57′N 8°31′E
- Country: Switzerland
- Canton: Nidwalden
- District: n.a.

Area
  - Total: 28.63 km^{2} (11.05 sq mi)
- Elevation: 774 m (2,539 ft)

Population (December 2020)
  - Total: 1,541
  - Density: 53.82/km^{2} (139.4/sq mi)
- Time zone: UTC+01:00 (CET)
  - Summer (DST): UTC+02:00 (CEST)
- Postal code: 6376
- SFOS number: 1504
- ISO 3166 code: CH-NW
- Surrounded by: Beckenried, Gersau (SZ), Ingenbohl (SZ), Isenthal (UR), Seelisberg (UR)
- Website: www.emmetten.ch

Emmetten is a municipality in the canton of Nidwalden in Switzerland.

== History ==
Emmetten is first mentioned about 1160 as Empnoten.

== Geography ==
Aerial view (1956)

Emmetten has an area, as of 2006, of 25 square kilometers (9.7 sq mi). Of this area, 37.9% is used for agricultural purposes, while 45.8% is forested. Of the rest of the land, 2.6% is settled (buildings or roads) and the remainder (13.7%) is non-productive (rivers, glaciers or mountains).

The municipality is located along the cantonal highway between Beckenried and Seelisberg on both sides of the Egg crossing over the edge of Lake Lucerne.

== Demographics ==
Emmetten has a population (as of 31 December 2020) of 1,541. As of 2007, 15.4% of the population was made up of foreign nationals. Over the last 10 years the population has grown at a rate of 3.7%. Most of the population (as of 2000) speaks German (91.8%), with English being second most common ( 1.8%) and Italian being third ( 1.5%). As of 2008 the gender distribution of the population was 53.4% male and 46.6% female.

As of 2000 there are 487 households, of which 310 households (or about 63.7%) contain only one or two individuals. 36 or about 7.4% are large households, with at least five members.

In the 2007 federal election the most popular party was the FDP which received 87.1% of the vote. Most of the rest of the votes went to local small right-wing parties (9.9%).

In Emmetten about 69.1% of the population (between age 25–64) have completed either non-mandatory upper secondary education or additional higher education (either university or a Fachhochschule).

The historical population is given in the following table:

| year | population |
|---|---|
| 1743 | 378 |
| 1850 | 659 |
| 1860 | 603 |
| 1880 | 632 |
| 1900 | 593 |
| 1950 | 680 |
| 1960 | 698 |
| 1970 | 631 |
| 1980 | 715 |
| 1990 | 1,013 |
| 2000 | 1,222 |
| 2005 | 1,184 |

== Industry ==
Emmetten has an unemployment rate of 0.94%. As of 2005, there were 75 people employed in the primary economic sector and about 27 businesses involved in this sector. 38 people are employed in the secondary sector and there are 9 businesses in this sector. 198 people are employed in the tertiary sector, with 42 businesses in this sector.

== Sights ==
The main sights of Emmetten are: the St. Anna chapel in Schöneck, the church St. Jakob und St. Theresia, the chapel of the holy cross with frescos of danse macabre in Sagendorf, and the chapel in Erlen.
