= Morschach =

- Municipality
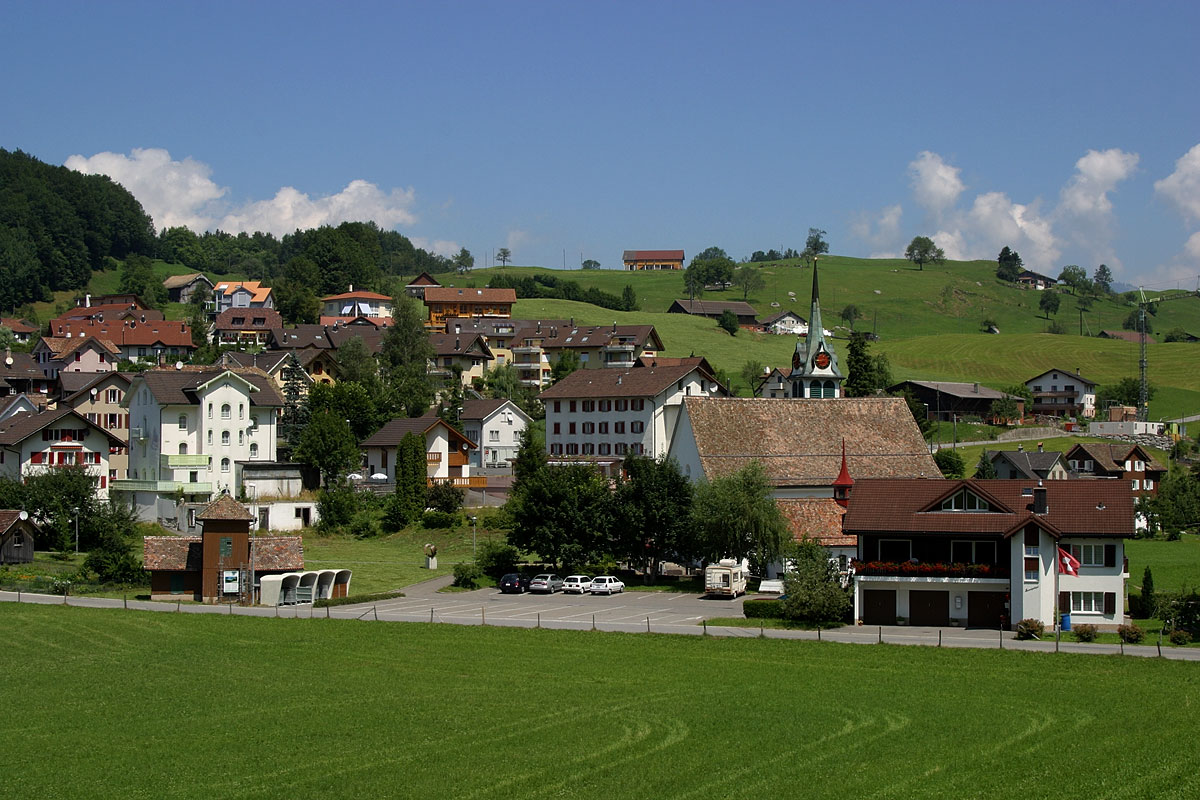

- Flag Coat of arms
- Location of Morschach
- Location within Switzerland Location within Canton of Schwyz
- Coordinates: 46°58′N 8°37′E
- Country: Switzerland
- Canton: Schwyz
- District: Schwyz

Area
  - Total: 23.4 km^{2} (9.0 sq mi)
- Elevation: 650 m (2,130 ft)

Population (December 2020)
  - Total: 1,151
  - Density: 49.2/km^{2} (127/sq mi)
- Time zone: UTC+01:00 (CET)
  - Summer (DST): UTC+02:00 (CEST)
- Postal code: 6443
- SFOS number: 1366
- ISO 3166 code: CH-SZ
- Surrounded by: Ingenbohl, Muotathal, Riemenstalden, Seelisberg (UR), Sisikon (UR), Schwyz
- Website: www.morschach.ch

Morschach is a municipality in Schwyz District in the canton of Schwyz in Switzerland. It was a world-famous resort from 1869 up to the Great Depression.

== Geography ==
The municipality is located on a glacier moraine above the Lake of Lucerne. It consists of the village of Morschach and includes the summer and winter resort at Stoos.

Morschach has an area, as of 2006, of 20.8 km^{2} (8.0 sq mi). Of this area, 52.3% is used for agricultural purposes, while 36.2% is forested. Of the rest of the land, 2.9% is settled (buildings or roads) and the remainder (8.6%) is non-productive (rivers, glaciers or mountains).

== History ==
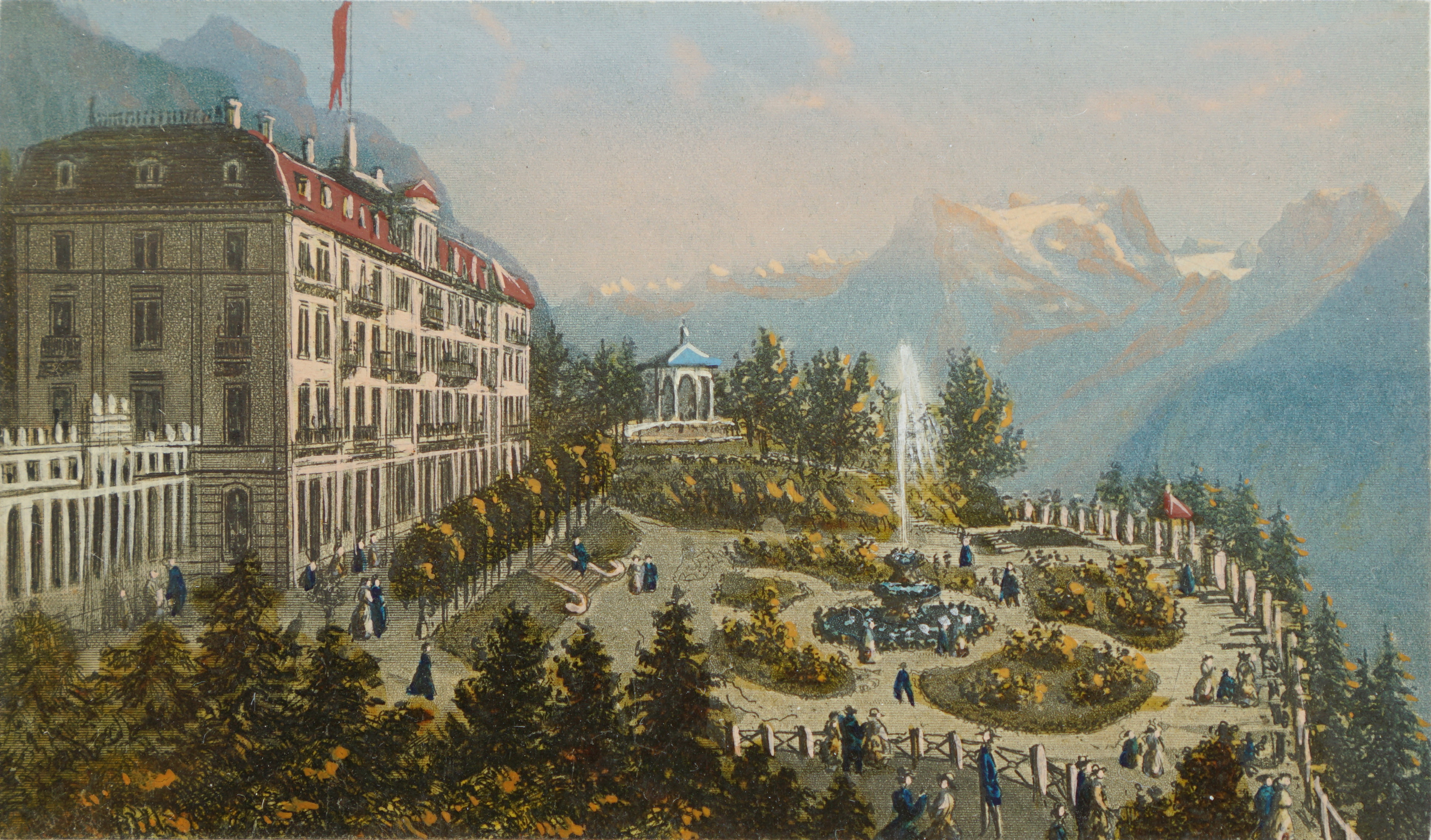
The Grand Hôtel Axenstein c. 1880. Etching by Heinrich Müller

Morschach is first mentioned in 1261 as Morsacho. From the 13th century until 1865, when the Axenstrasse was finished, the bridle path towards the Gotthard Pass led through the village. In 1869, the Grand Hotel Axenstein opened in a site which Queen Victoria had called "the most beautiful place on earth", because of its stunning views of Lake Lucerne far below and the surrounding mountains. Four years later, a second luxury hotel was built, the Palace Hotel Axenfels. Among the celebrities who spent their holidays in Morschach were King Ludwig II of Bavaria, Queen Wilhelmina of the Netherlands and Winston Churchill. In 1905, a rack railway was built from Brunnen to Morschach and Axenstein. But the Great Depression and World War II led to a dramatic decline of international tourism, from which the old Morschach hotels never recovered. The "Axenfels" was demolished in 1947, the "Axenstein" in 1967. The rack railway was closed in 1969.

Since the Swiss Holiday Park opened in 1982, Morschach has become a major resort again.

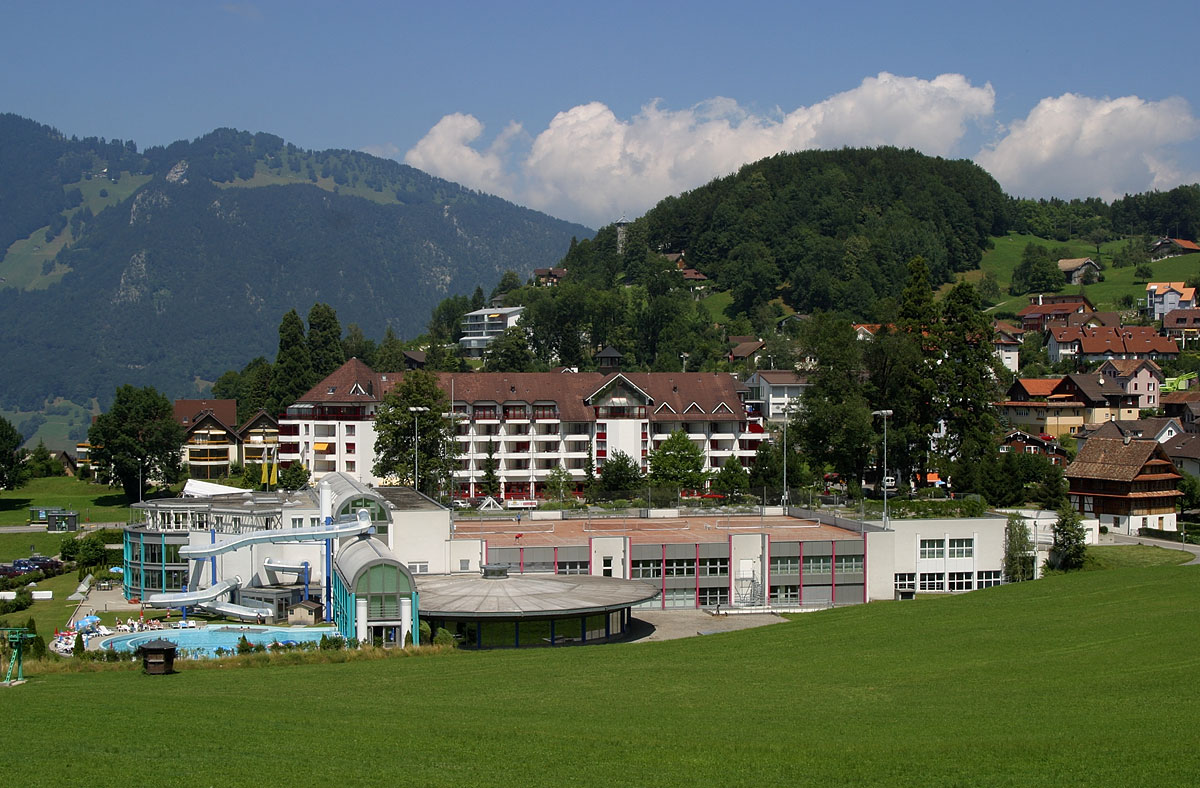
Morschach

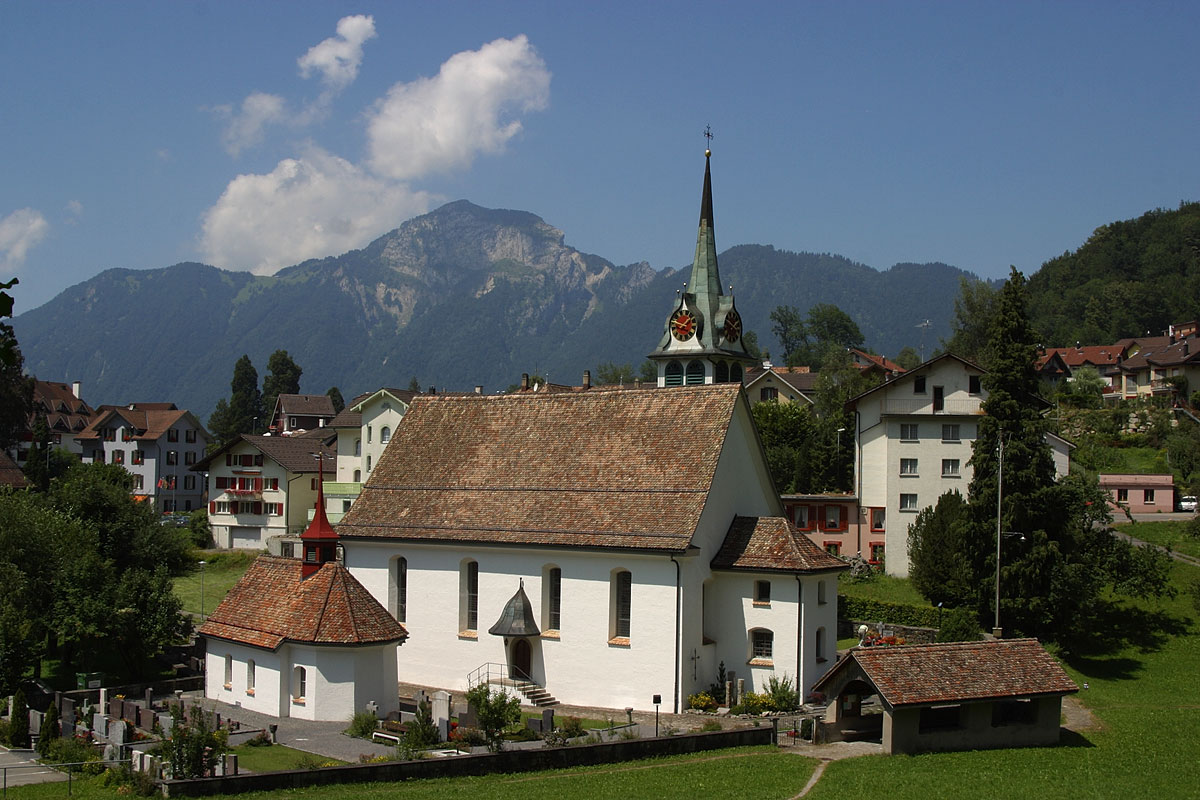
Village church in Morschach

Aerial view (1953)

== Demographics ==
Morschach has a population (as of 31 December 2020) of 1,151. As of 2007, 14.7% of the population was made up of foreign nationals. Over the last 10 years the population has grown at a rate of 9.3%. Most of the population (as of 2000) speaks German (89.0%), with Serbo-Croatian being second most common ( 2.0%) and Portuguese being third ( 1.7%).

As of 2000 the gender distribution of the population was 54.4% male and 45.6% female. The age distribution, as of 2008, in Morschach is; 274 people or 28.6% of the population is between 0 and 19. 331 people or 34.6% are 20 to 39, and 247 people or 25.8% are 40 to 64. The senior population distribution is 67 people or 7.0% are 65 to 74. There are 36 people or 3.8% who are 70 to 79 and 3 people or 0.31% of the population who are over 80.

As of 2000 there are 305 households, of which 75 households (or about 24.6%) contain only a single individual. 27 or about 8.9% are large households, with at least five members. In the 2007 election the most popular party was the SVP which received 45.6% of the vote. The next three most popular parties were the CVP (26.3%), the SPS (16%) and the FDP (8.6%).

In Morschach about 57.2% of the population (between age 25-64) have completed either non-mandatory upper secondary education or additional higher education (either university or a Fachhochschule).

Morschach has an unemployment rate of 1.41%. As of 2005, there were 70 people employed in the primary economic sector and about 32 businesses involved in this sector. 15 people are employed in the secondary sector and there are 6 businesses in this sector. 434 people are employed in the tertiary sector, with 42 businesses in this sector.

From the 2000 census, 710 or 74.1% are Roman Catholic, while 65 or 6.8% belonged to the Swiss Reformed Church. Of the rest of the population, there are 6 individuals (or about 0.63% of the population) who belong to the Orthodox Church, and there are less than 5 individuals who belong to another Christian church. There are 13 (or about 1.36% of the population) who are Islamic. There are less than 5 individuals who belong to another church (not listed on the census), 66 (or about 6.89% of the population) belong to no church, are agnostic or atheist, and 95 individuals (or about 9.92% of the population) did not answer the question.

The historical population is given in the following table:

year	population
1850	462
1900	518
1950	587
1980	632
1985	771
1990	824
2000	848
2005	893
2007	938
