= Wind egg =

Wind egg or variants may refer to:

- Cock egg, an egg without a yolk and/or a shell
- Windegg (disambiguation)
