= Goldau =

City in the community of Arth, canton of Schwyz, Switzerland

Coordinates: 47°2′53″N 8°32′59″E

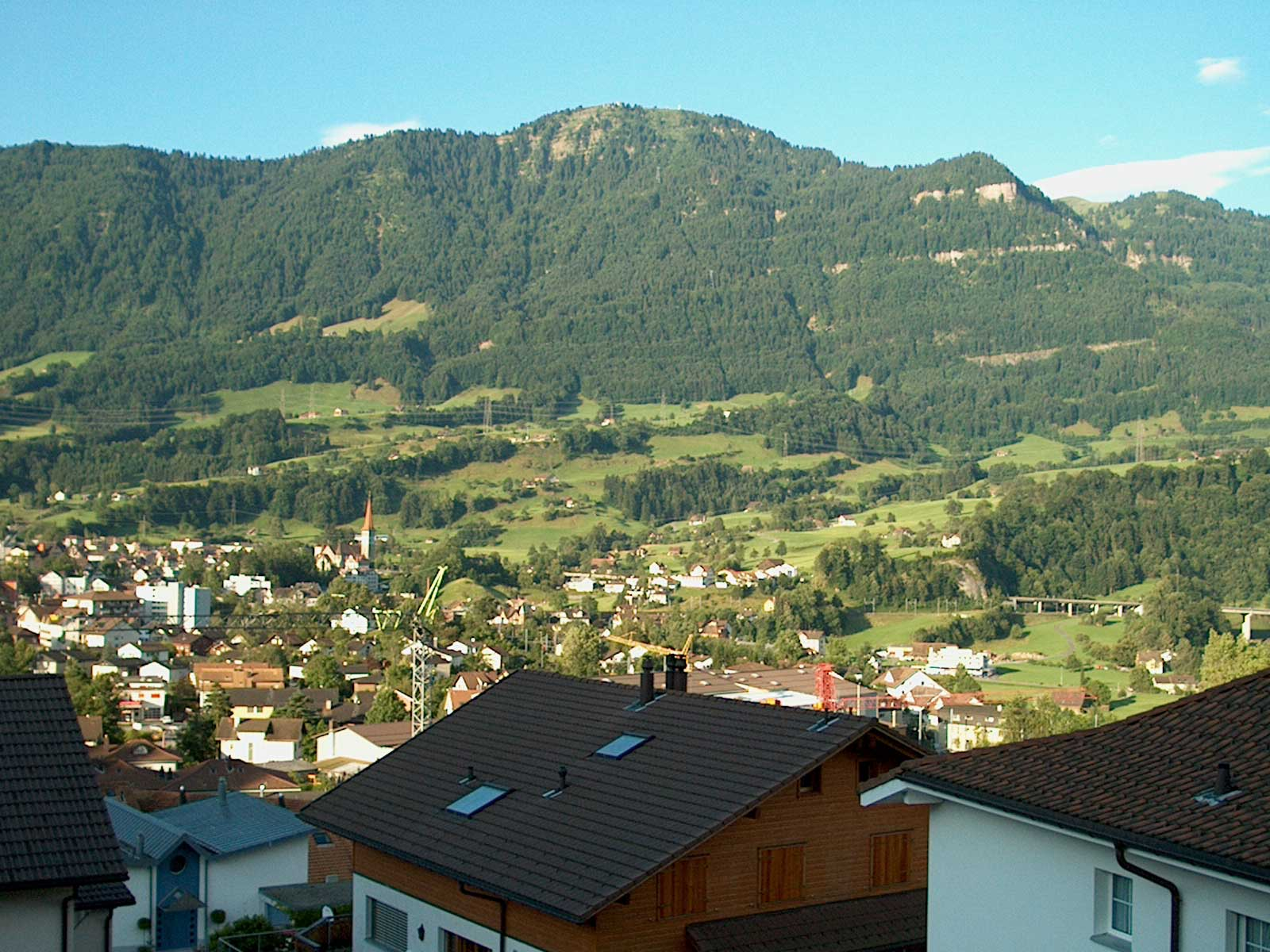
Rigi Scheidegg seen from Goldau

Goldau is a town in the community of Arth, canton of Schwyz, Switzerland. It lies between the Rigi and Rossberg mountains, and between lakes Zug and Lauerz. Well known attractions include the Natur- und Tierpark Goldau and the Arth-Goldau valley station of the Arth-Rigi Bahn connecting to the Rigi mountain.

Goldau is primarily known in Switzerland for its historic landslide, the "Goldau landslide" (Goldauer Bergsturz) of 1806 which killed 457 people. It is also known for its importance for the Swiss railways network, with Arth-Goldau station forming the intersection between the Gotthard, Lucerne, Zug–Zürich and Pfäffikon lines.

== Goldau landslide ==
Contemporary etching showing the situation after the landslide

Aerial view from 1000 m by Walter Mittelholzer (1919)

There were numerous historical landslides in Goldau, with a major event, more significant than the 1806 landslide, dated to the 14th century. The toponym itself, first recorded in 1353, refers to the remnants of these landslides, from a dialectal gol, goleten "gravel, rubble, debris".

On September 2, 1806 heavy rains triggered a landslide from the Rossberg which destroyed Goldau and the adjacent villages of Buosingen, Röthen and Lauerz. The landslide comprised 40 million m^{3} (52 million cu yd) of material, with a mass of 120 million t (132 million short tons; 118 million long tons).

Part of the mass hit Lake Lauerz (which had been created by an even larger landslide in the 14th century), and the resulting tsunami-like displacement wave caused more devastation towards Seewen. The event destroyed 111 houses, 220 barns, and two churches in a disaster area of about 20 km^{2} (7.7 sq mi), parts of which were covered with debris to a height of 30–70 metres (98–230 ft). It resulted in the confirmed death of 457 people.

The disaster inspired the epic poem Goldau by American writer John Neal in 1818. A museum outside the Natur- und Tierpark exhibits findings and photos of the event.

== Sport ==
SC Goldau is the city's football club.
