= Arth =

- Municipality
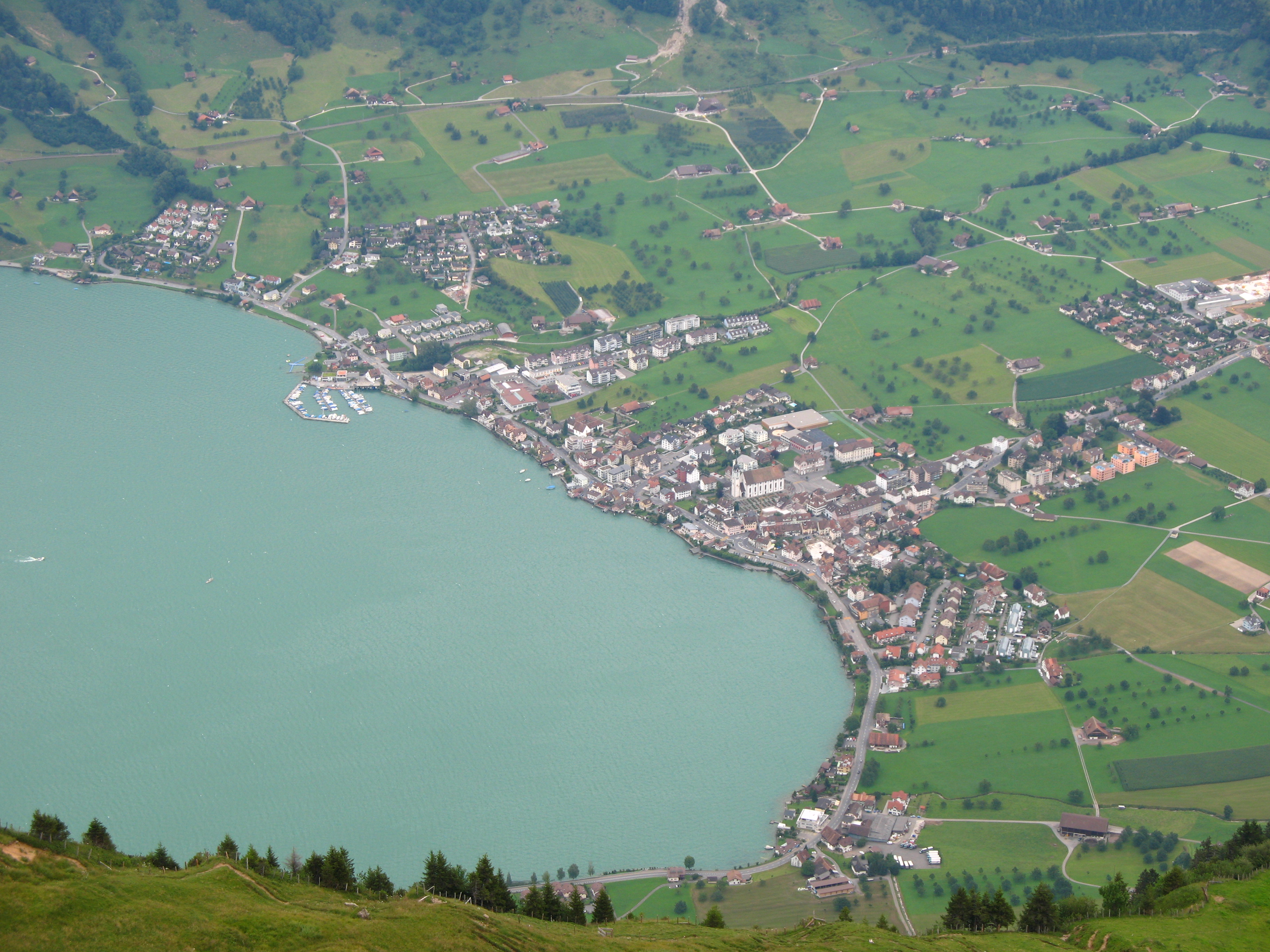
- The village Arth

- Coat of arms
- Location of Arth
- Location within Switzerland Location within Canton of Schwyz
- Coordinates: 47°3.801′N 8°31.309′E
- Country: Switzerland
- Canton: Schwyz
- District: Schwyz

Government
  - Executive: Gemeinderat with 9 members
  - Mayor: Gemeindepräsident; Ruedi Beeler CVP/PDC (as of 2014)
  - Parliament: none (Gemeindeversammlung)

Area
  - Total: 48.60 km^{2} (18.76 sq mi)
- Elevation (Kirche Arth): 417 m (1,368 ft)
- Highest elevation (Rigi Kulm): 1,798 m (5,899 ft)
- Lowest elevation (Lake Zug): 413 m (1,355 ft)

Population (December 2020)
  - Total: 12,184
  - Density: 250.7/km^{2} (649.3/sq mi)
- Time zone: UTC+01:00 (CET)
  - Summer (DST): UTC+02:00 (CEST)
- Postal codes: 6415 Arth, 6414 Oberarth, 6410 Goldau, 6410 Rigi Kulm, 6410 Rigi Staffel, 6410 Rigi Klösterli, 6356 Rigi Kaltbad
- SFOS number: 1362
- ISO 3166 code: CH-SZ
- Localities: Arth, Oberarth, Goldau, Rigi Kulm, Rigi Staffel, Rigi First, Rigi Klösterli,
- Surrounded by: Gersau, Küssnacht, Lauerz, Steinerberg, Vitznau (LU), Walchwil (ZG), Weggis (LU), Zug (ZG)
- Website: www.arth.ch

Arth is a village, a town, and a municipality in Schwyz District in the canton of Schwyz in Switzerland.

The municipality consists of the villages Arth, Oberarth, and Goldau. The four settlements Rigi Kulm, Rigi First, Rigi Klösterli, and Rigi Staffel on the mountain Rigi to the west of Arth are also part of the municipality.

== History ==
Arth is first mentioned in 1036 as Arta. In 1353 it was mentioned as ze Arth.

== Geography ==
Aerial view from 600 m by Walter Mittelholzer (1919)

Arth has an area, as of 2006, of 42.1 km^{2} (16.3 sq mi). Of this area, 40.8% is used for agricultural purposes, while 46.3% is forested. Of the rest of the land, 8.5% is settled (buildings or roads) and the remainder (4.3%) is non-productive (rivers, glaciers or mountains).

The municipality is situated on the southern shore of Lake Zug, and along the Gotthard route between Rigi and Rossberg. It consists of the villages of Arth Oberarth and Goldau as well as the hamlets of Klösterli and Kulm an der Rigi.

== Demographics ==
Arth has a population (as of 31 December 2020) of 12,184. As of 2007, 23.6% of the population was made up of foreign nationals. Over the last 10 years the population has grown at a rate of 6.3%. Most of the population (as of 2000) speaks German (86.9%), with Albanian being second most common ( 3.9%) and Serbo-Croatian being third ( 3.2%).

As of 2000 the gender distribution of the population was 50.3% male and 49.7% female. The age distribution, as of 2008, in Arth is; 2,555 people or 26.6% of the population is between 0 and 19. 2,870 people or 29.9% are 20 to 39, and 2,832 people or 29.5% are 40 to 64. The senior population distribution is 734 people or 7.7% are 65 to 74. There are 467 people or 4.9% who are 70 to 79 and 135 people or 1.41% of the population who are over 80. There is one person in Arth who is over 100 years old.

As of 2000 there are 3,806 households, of which 1,156 households (or about 30.4%) contain only a single individual. 275 or about 7.2% are large households, with at least five members.

In the 2007 election the most popular party was the SVP which received 38.8% of the vote. The next three most popular parties were the CVP (20.8%), the FDP (20.4%) and the SPS (16.3%).

In Arth about 63.6% of the population (between age 25–64) have completed either non-mandatory upper secondary education or additional higher education (either university or a Fachhochschule).

Arth has an unemployment rate of 1.55%. As of 2005, there were 329 people employed in the primary economic sector and about 129 businesses involved in this sector. 810 people are employed in the secondary sector and there are 88 businesses in this sector. 1868 people are employed in the tertiary sector, with 302 businesses in this sector.

From the 2000 census, 6,927 or 72.2% are Roman Catholic, while 939 or 9.8% belonged to the Swiss Reformed Church. Of the rest of the population, there are less than 5 individuals who belong to the Christian Catholic faith, there are 273 individuals (or about 2.85% of the population) who belong to the Orthodox Church, and there are 7 individuals (or about 0.07% of the population) who belong to another Christian church. There are less than 5 individuals who are Jewish, and 717 (or about 7.47% of the population) who are Islamic. There are 84 individuals (or about 0.88% of the population) who belong to another church (not listed on the census), 337 (or about 3.51% of the population) belong to no church, are agnostic or atheist, and 302 individuals (or about 3.15% of the population) did not answer the question.

The historical population is given in the following table:

year	population
1743	2,134
1850	2,196
1900	4,739
1950	5,816
2000	9,593
2005	9,918
2007	10,227

== Transport ==
The railway station at Goldau, named Arth-Goldau, is an important junction of the Swiss Federal Railways. The Voralpen Express train connects here to Luzern and St. Gallen. Meanwhile, trains to Bellinzona, Lugano and Italy, as well as trains to Zug and Zürich join here with trains heading toward Basel.

== Notable people ==
- Karl Jakob Weber (1712 in Arth – 1764) a Swiss architect and engineer who was in charge of the first organized excavations at Herculaneum, Pompeii and Stabiae
- Robbie Hunter (born 1977) a retired South African professional road racing cyclist who competed professionally between 1999 and 2013; now lives in Arth

== Gallery ==
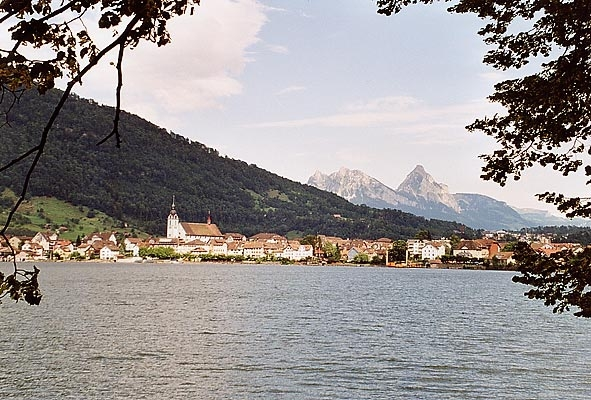
Arth

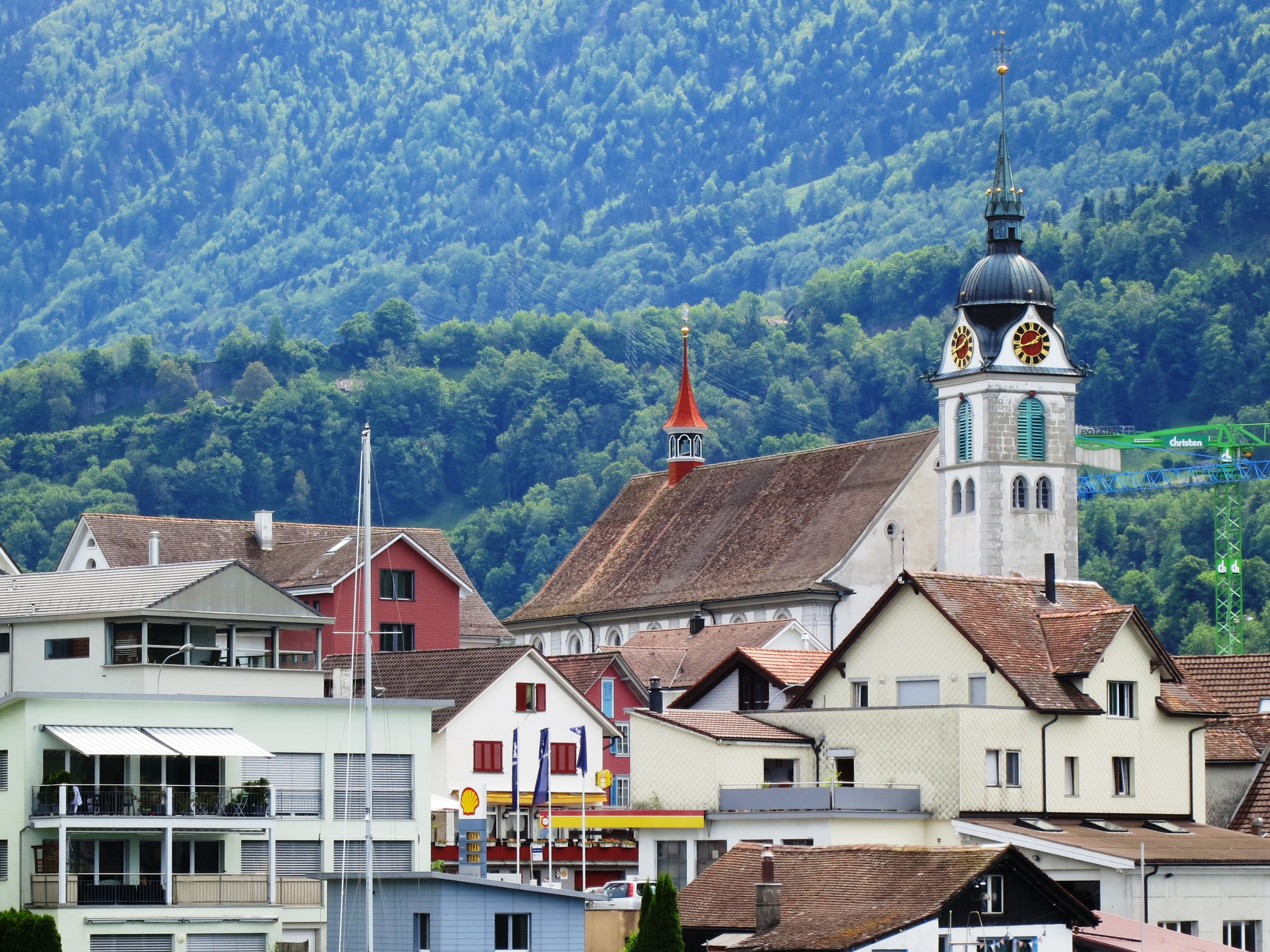
Arth, Church

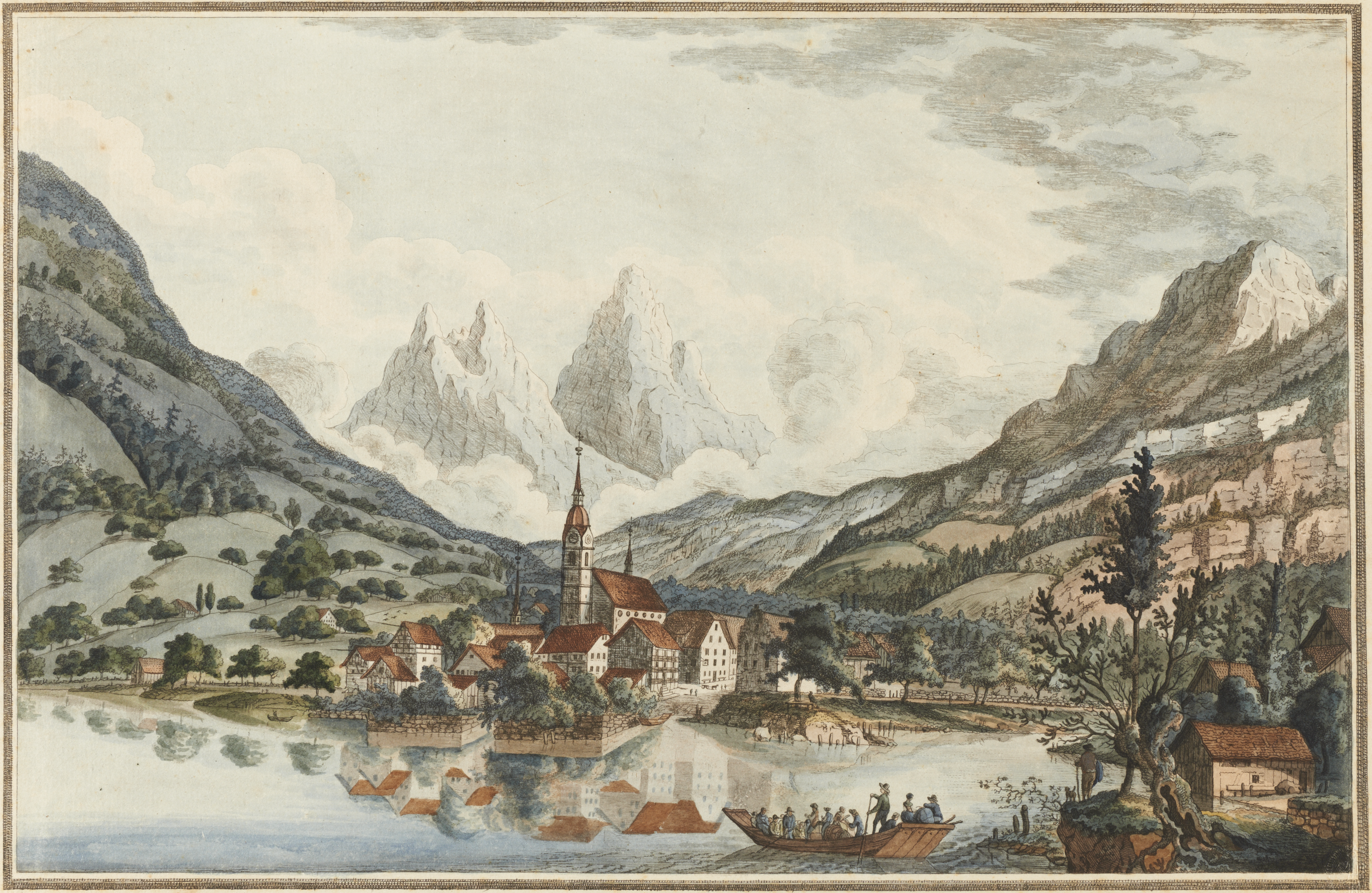
Arth about 1780
