= Gersau =

- Municipality
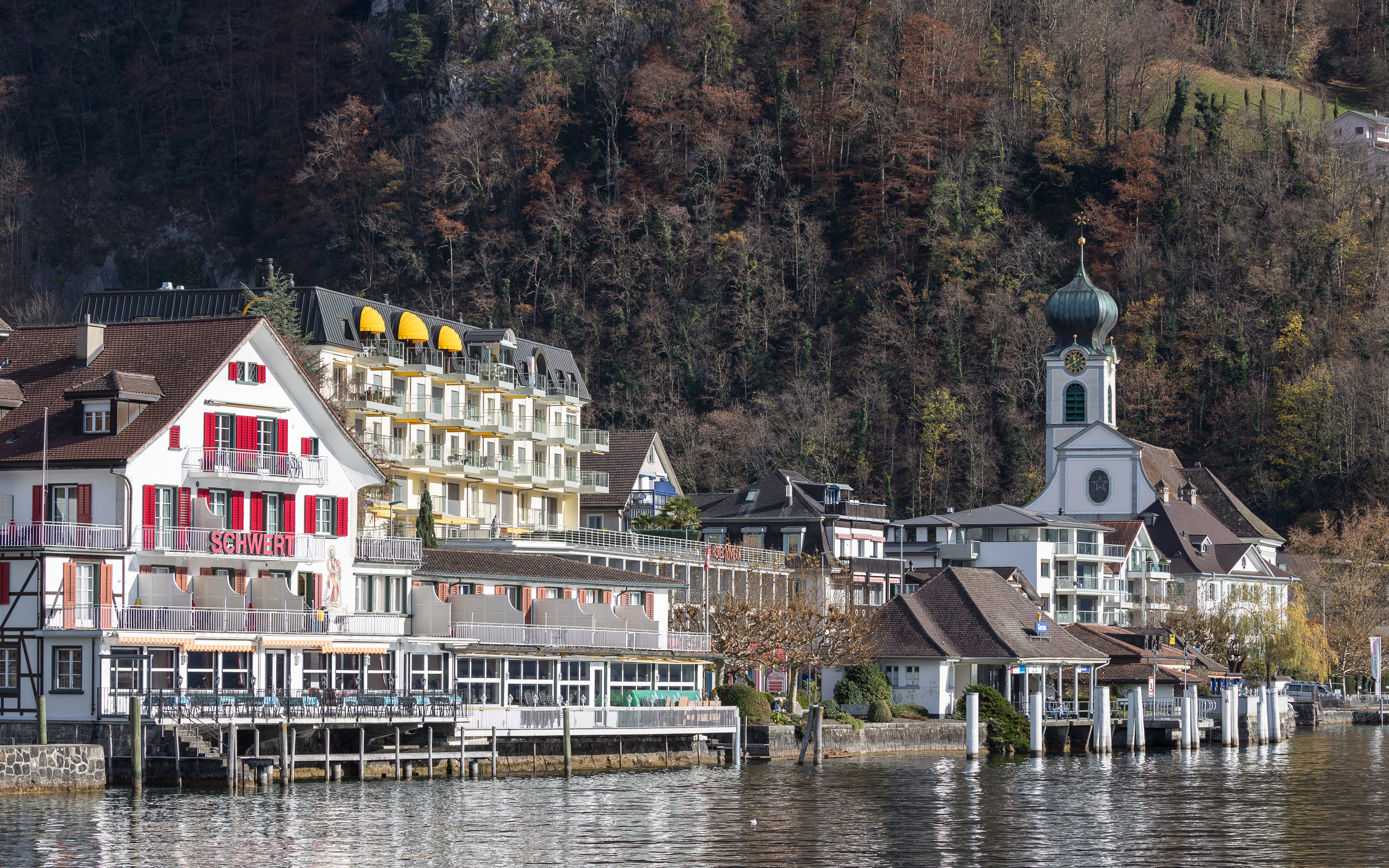

- Flag Coat of arms
- Location of Gersau
- Location within Switzerland Location within Canton of Schwyz
- Coordinates: 46°59′N 8°31′E
- Country: Switzerland
- Canton: Schwyz
- District: Gersau

Area
  - Total: 23.70 km^{2} (9.15 sq mi)
- Elevation: 435 m (1,427 ft)

Population (December 2020)
  - Total: 2,364
  - Density: 99.75/km^{2} (258.3/sq mi)
- Time zone: UTC+01:00 (CET)
  - Summer (DST): UTC+02:00 (CEST)
- Postal code: 6442
- SFOS number: 1311
- ISO 3166 code: CH-SZ
- Surrounded by: Arth, Beckenried (NW), Buochs (NW), Emmetten (NW), Ennetbürgen (NW), Ingenbohl, Lauerz, Vitznau (LU)
- Website: www.gersau.ch

Gersau is a municipality and district in the canton of Schwyz in Switzerland, on the shores of Lake Lucerne. Gersau was for many centuries an independent micro-state in permanent alliance with the Swiss Confederation.

== History ==
Aerial view from 200 m by Walter Mittelholzer (1919)

Gersau is first mentioned in 1064 as Gersouwe. The estates of Gersau gradually came into the hands of the Habsburgs, but in 1333, under dukes Albert II and Otto IV the Merry of Austria, the jurisdiction and rights over Gersau fell into the hands of Lucerne nobility. On 1359, Gersau allied with the Old Swiss Confederacy as a protectorate of the Confederacy, for its protection and to gain arms from the confederates. On 9 July 1386, the citizens of Gersau fought with the Swiss for the first time, on the battlefield of Sempach, where the banner of Count Rudolf of Hohenzollern was captured.

Republic of Gersau

The Republic of Gersau (called "altfrye Republik Gersau", literal "old-free Republik Gersau", in early modern times) was an independent small state in the area of today's Canton of Schwyz in Switzerland. It was created in 1390 when the residents of the village of Gersau bought themselves free from the rule by bailiffs from Lucerne and from then on exercised their rights themselves. In 1433 they were officially granted the status of a direct imperial free state in the Holy Roman Empire by Emperor Sigismund. After that, Gersau took care of its internal affairs for over three and a half centuries. Within the Confederation, the republic was a place that turned towards it and was under the protection and patronage of the four forest sites (Luzern, Schwyz, Uri and Unterwalden).

With the French invasion of 1798, the republic fell and was assigned to the canton of Waldstätten during the time of the Helvetic Republic. The mediation constitution decreed by Napoleon Bonaparte attached the village to the canton of Schwyz. After the end of Napoleon's rule, the inhabitants again proclaimed the Republic of Gersau in 1814, which was recognized by the old umbrella towns. Based on the provisions of the Congress of Vienna and the Federal Treaty of 1815, the canton of Schwyz strove to incorporate the 23.7 square kilometer republic located between the southern slope of the Rigi and the northern shore of Lake Lucerne. This was achieved in 1817 with the approval of the Diet. On January 1, 1818, the republic was dissolved; their area today forms the Gersau district.

Gersau purchased its liberty from the counts of Habsburg in 1390 for the sum of 690 Pfunds in pfennigs. The fate of the Vogtei and whether or not the municipality pledged to the Confederacy was then in the hands of Lucerners John, Peter and Agnes von Moos; as a result, the jurisdiction, Vogtei and tax rights went to the courtiers of Gersau, allowing a free municipality without being mortgaged to some other power. In Basel, in 1433, Gersau received original confirmation of the ancient freedoms, rights and privileges from Emperor Sigismund, thus becoming a Reichsunmittelbar municipality under the direct protection of the Holy Roman Emperor, with its own courts, covering an area of 24 km^{2} (9.3 sq mi).

During the French Revolutionary Wars Gersau was annexed into the Helvetic Republic, becoming a district of the canton of Waldstätten. After the Act of Mediation and the collapse of the Helvetic Republic, Gersau became a district of the canton of Schwyz until 1814, when it regained its independence, with Schwyzer approval, centred on the 1745 Rathaus, containing council chambers and a courtroom (now a museum).

In 1817, the Tagsatzung decided, on the basis of the Congress of Vienna and the first article of the Federal Treaty that Gersau should be united with the canton of Schwyz, which took effect the following year, against its wishes, becoming the sixth and last district of the canton of Schwyz.

== Geography ==
Gersau is in a self-contained location, nestled in a sunny recess in the lee of the south face of Rigi. Gersau is protected from cool winds by the Rigi-Hochfluh and Gersauerstock peaks to the north, and the winds are further moderated by Lake Lucerne to the south. This produces a mild climate in which Sweet Chestnut trees thrive, and as a result of which Gersau is known in the region as the Riviera of Lake Lucerne.

Gersau has an area, as of 2006, of 14.4 km^{2} (5.6 sq mi). Of this area, 40.3% is used for agricultural purposes, while 52.4% is forested. Of the rest of the land, 5.7% is settled (buildings or roads) and the remainder (1.7%) is non-productive (rivers, glaciers or mountains).

Until the mid 19th Century Gersau could only be reached by water or over the Gätterli pass from Lauerz. Since 1817 it has been the only municipality in the District of Gersau.

The Beckenried–Gersau car ferry links Gersau with Beckenried, on the opposite bank of Lake Lucerne.

== Demographics ==
| year | population |
|---|---|
| 1774 | ca. 1,000 |
| 1850 | 1,585 |
| 1870 | 2,270 |
| 1880 | 1,775 (Note: population decrease due to collapse of the silk industry) |
| 1900 | 1,887 |
| 1910 | 2,263 (Note: population increased due to expansion of the silk industry) |
| 1950 | 1,890 |
| 1960 | 1,754 |
| 1970 | 1,753 |
| 1980 | 1,813 |
| 1985 | 1,801 |
| 1990 | 1,851 |
| 2000 | 1,965 |
| 2005 | 1,972 |
| 2007 | 1,970 |

Gersau has a population (as of 31 December 2020) of 2,364. As of 2007, 17.7% of the population was made up of foreign nationals. Over the last 10 years the population has decreased at a rate of −0.1%. Most of the population (as of 2000) speaks German (90.6%), with Serbo-Croatian being second most common (2.0%) and Italian being third (1.7%).

As of 2000 the gender distribution of the population was 50.5% male and 49.5% female. The age distribution, as of 2008, in Gersau is; 464 people or 24.0% of the population is between 0 and 19. 481 people or 24.9% are 20 to 39, and 657 people or 34.0% are 40 to 64. The senior population distribution is 180 people or 9.3% are 65 to 74. There are 105 people or 5.4% who are 70 to 79 and 47 people or 2.43% of the population who are over 80.

As of 2000 there are 799 households, of which 258 households (or about 32.3%) contain only a single individual. 41 or about 5.1% are large households, with at least five members.

In the 2007 election the most popular party was the SVP which received 39.5% of the vote. The next three most popular parties were the CVP (28.9%), the FDP (14.9%) and the SPS (12.5%).

The entire Swiss population is generally well educated. In Gersau about 66.8% of the population (between age 25–64) have completed either non-mandatory upper secondary education or additional higher education (either university or a Fachhochschule).

From the 2000 census, 1,494 or 77.2% are Roman Catholic, while 132 or 6.8% belonged to the Swiss Reformed Church. Of the rest of the population, there are 69 individuals (or about 3.57% of the population) who belong to the Orthodox Church, and there are less than 5 individuals who belong to another Christian church. There are less than 5 individuals who are Jewish, and 60 (or about 3.10% of the population) who are Islamic. There are 18 individuals (or about 0.93% of the population) who belong to another church (not listed on the census), 90 (or about 4.65% of the population) belong to no church, are agnostic or atheist, and 67 individuals (or about 3.46% of the population) did not answer the question.

== Heritage sites of national significance ==
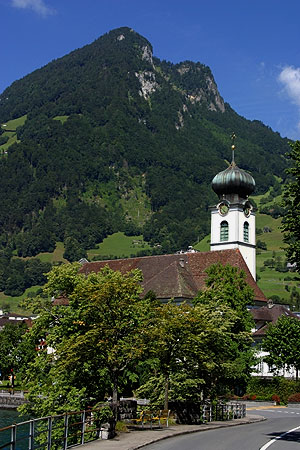
Parish Church of St. Marzellus

The Parish Church of St. Marzellus is listed as a Swiss heritage site of national significance. The entire village of Gersau is part of the Inventory of Swiss Heritage Sites.

== Economy ==
Historically, silk weaving and woodworking were the predominant industries. Today, however, tourism has become the main economic sector. Gersau has been a well-known health and vacation resort since 1860, with a significant number of hotels and guest houses.

Gersau has an unemployment rate of 1.62%. As of 2005, there were 105 people employed in the primary economic sector and about 43 businesses involved in this sector. 129 people are employed in the secondary sector and there are 25 businesses in this sector. 350 people are employed in the tertiary sector, with 71 businesses in this sector.

== Cuisine ==
Culinary specialties of Gersau include salty cheesecake and a dessert called Rahmschinken.

== Famous people ==
=== Born in Gersau ===
- Walter Nigg (1903–1988), Theologian
- Josef Maria Camenzind (1904–1984), Catholic priest and writer
- Benno Ammann (1904–1986), conductor and composer
- Oskar Camenzind (1971– ), former professional road racing cyclist, 1998 road cycling world champion
