= Lake Lauerz =

Lake in Switzerland

Lake Lauerz Lauerzersee
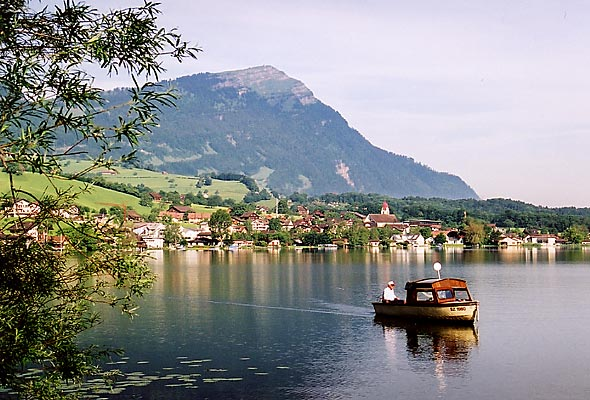
- With Lauerz, Rigi in the back

- Location within Canton of Schwyz Location within Switzerland Location within Alps
- Interactive map of Lake Lauerz; Lauerzersee
- Location: Canton of Schwyz
- Coordinates: 47°2′1″N 8°36′12″E
- Primary inflows: Steiner Aa
- Primary outflows: Seeweren
- Basin countries: Switzerland
- Surface area: 3.0664 km^{2} (1.1839 sq mi)
- Average depth: 7.6 m (24.9 ft)
- Max. depth: 13 m (42.7 ft)
- Water volume: 23,400,000 m^{3} (18,970 acre⋅ft)
- Residence time: 0.3378 years
- Surface elevation: 447 m (1,466.5 ft)
- Islands: Schwanau, Roggenburg
- Settlements: Lauerz, Seewen

Lake Lauerz (German: Lauerzersee, old spelling: Lowerzer See) is a lake in the Canton of Schwyz, Switzerland.

== Geography ==
Its water area varies between 310 ha (766.0 acres) and 360 ha (889.6 acres) (depending on water level), a maximum depth of 14 m (45.9 ft), and a water level elevation above sea level of 447 m (1,466.5 ft).

The lake's water area is divided between the municipalities of Lauerz, Schwyz and Steinen. There are two small islands in the lake, Schwanau and Roggenburg, both of which are in the municipality of Lauerz. The villages of Lauerz, on the southern side of the lake and in its eponymous municipality, and Seewen, at the eastern end of the lake in the municipality of Schwyz, lie on or close to the shore of the lake.

The lake's principal inflow is the Steiner Aa, which flows into the north shore of the lake having passed through the village of Steinen, along with a number of smaller streams. The lake's outflow is at Seewen and takes the form of the Seeweren, a 1.5 km (0.93 mi) long stream. The Seeweren in turn flows into the Muota river, some 2 km (1.2 mi) above that river's mouth on Lake Lucerne.

Lake Lauerz lies in the Schwyz basin, between the Rossberg and the Rigi, and is divided into two basins by a tectonic ridge running southwest to northeast near the island of Schwanau. With an average depth of around 6 metres, the lake is in a stage of sedimentation.

The Steiner Aa delivers large quantities of fine sediment to the western basin, particularly during periods of high discharge from the steep, flysch-dominated catchment area. This has led to the formation of a substantial delta, whose front continues to advance into the lake. Sediment accumulation on the lake bed averages approximately 1 to 3.6 centimetres per year, and over long timescales this natural process is gradually transforming the shallow lake into a riverine landscape.

Lake Lauerz is not artificially regulated and functions as a natural retention basin, with water levels fluctuating by more than two metres.

The 1806 Goldau landslide impacted the lake and caused a tsunami 20 metres (65.6 ft) high. The landslide deposited large volumes of debris into the lake, reducing its surface area. This damaged the villages of Lauerz and Seewen and the island of Schwanau, and partly filled the lake. More recently, floods in 1999 and 2005 have affected lakeside properties, especially in Lauerz, and attempts have been made to control the water level by connecting Lake Lauerz through a tunnel to Lake Lucerne.

== History ==
Before the introduction of electric refrigeration, Lake Lauerz was used in winter for ice harvesting, supplying breweries and hotels in the surrounding region.

From the mid-20th century onwards, increasing concerns about flooding, lakeside development and environmental preservation led to the introduction of formal protection measures for the lake.

== Gallery ==
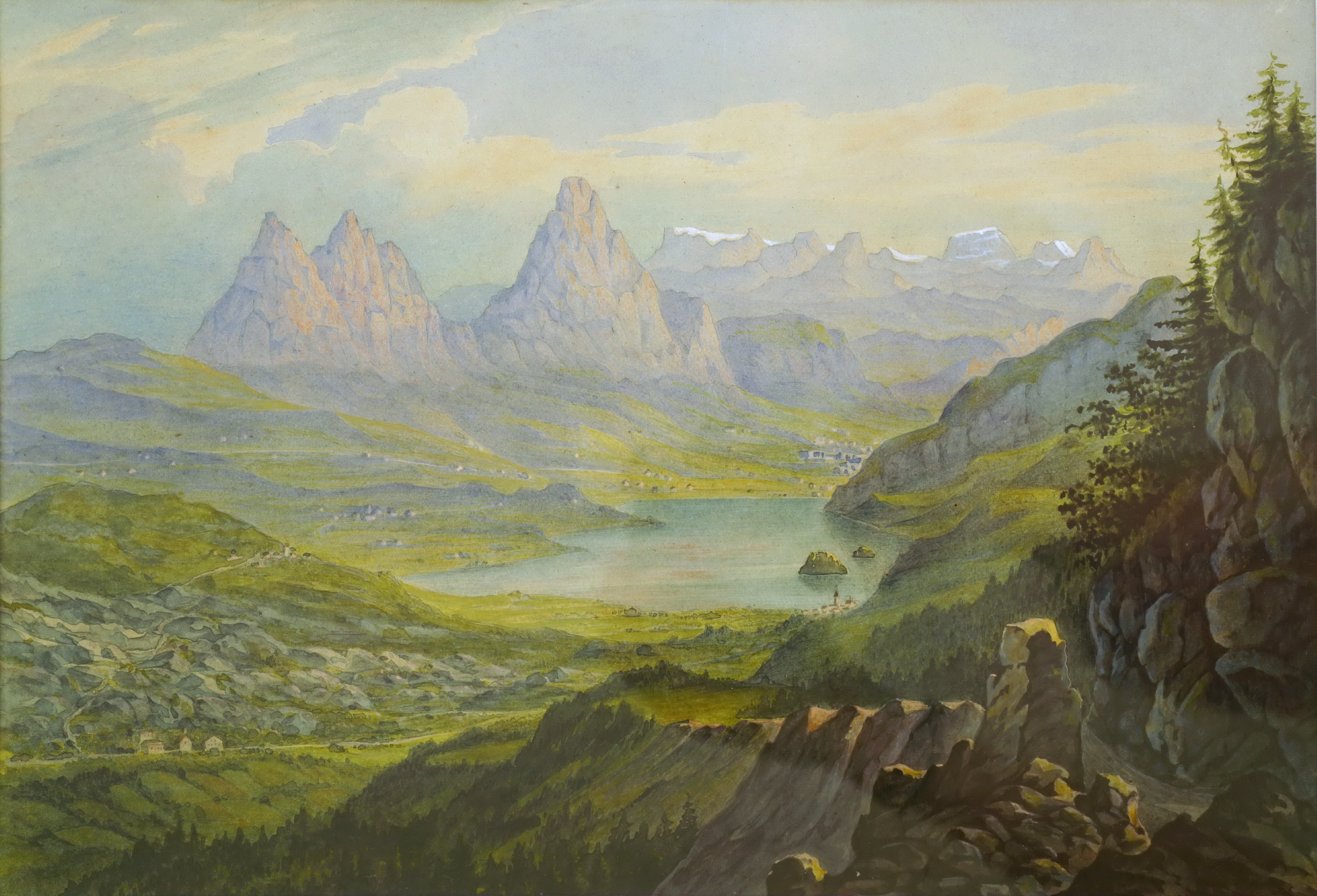
Lake Lauerz and Mythen 1870/80, with remains of the 1806 landslide. Watercolour by Heinrich Müller

== See also ==
- List of lakes of Switzerland
