= Pfund =

Pfund is German for "pound weight" and is also a surname. Notable people with the surname include:

- August Herman Pfund (1879–1949), American physicist and spectroscopist
- Guillermo Pfund (born 1989), Argentine footballer
- Jessica Pfund (born 1998), American skater
- Lee Pfund (1919-2016), Major League Baseball pitcher
- Nicola Pfund (born 1960), Swiss-Italian writer
- Randy Pfund (born 1951), NBA head coach & executive
- Roger Pfund (born 1943), Swiss graphic artist
