= Ingenbohl =

- Municipality
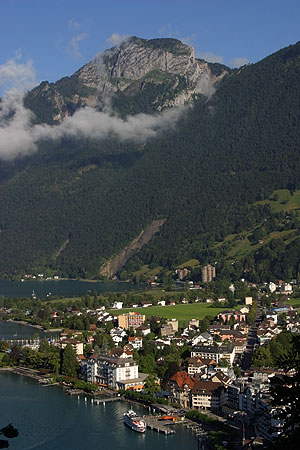

- Coat of arms
- Location of Ingenbohl
- Location within Switzerland Location within Canton of Schwyz
- Coordinates: 46°59′N 8°36′E
- Country: Switzerland
- Canton: Schwyz
- District: Schwyz

Area
  - Total: 16.20 km^{2} (6.25 sq mi)
- Elevation: 439 m (1,440 ft)

Population (December 2020)
  - Total: 8,977
  - Density: 554.1/km^{2} (1,435/sq mi)
- Time zone: UTC+01:00 (CET)
  - Summer (DST): UTC+02:00 (CEST)
- Postal code: 6440
- SFOS number: 1364
- ISO 3166 code: CH-SZ
- Surrounded by: Emmetten (NW), Gersau, Lauerz, Morschach, Seelisberg (UR), Schwyz
- Website: www.ingenbohl.ch

Ingenbohl (High Alemannic: Ingäbohl) is a municipality in Schwyz District in the canton of Schwyz in Switzerland.

== History ==
Ingenbohl is first mentioned in 1387 as uff Ingenbol.

== Geography ==
Aerial view (1948)

Ingenbohl has an area, as of 2006, of 13.5 km^{2} (5.2 sq mi). Of this area, 31% is used for agricultural purposes, while 49.1% is forested. Of the rest of the land, 16.1% is settled (buildings or roads) and the remainder (3.8%) is non-productive (rivers, glaciers or mountains).

Ingenbohl is located along the Lake of Lucerne. It consists of the village of Ingenbohl and the hamlets of Brunnen, Wilen, Schränggigen and Unterschönenbuch as well as scattered farm houses.

== Demographics ==
Ingenbohl has a population (as of 31 December 2020) of 8,977. As of 2007, 19.4% of the population was made up of foreign nationals. Over the last 10 years the population has grown at a rate of 16.1%. Most of the population (as of 2000) speaks German (88.9%), with Serbo-Croatian being second most common ( 3.5%) and Italian being third ( 2.4%).

As of 2000 the gender distribution of the population was 45.2% male and 54.8% female. The age distribution, as of 2008, in Ingenbohl is; 1,724 people or 23.0% of the population is between 0 and 19. 2,069 people or 27.7% are 20 to 39, and 2,325 people or 31.1% are 40 to 64. The senior population distribution is 667 people or 8.9% are 65 to 74. There are 470 people or 6.3% who are 70 to 79 and 227 people or 3.03% of the population who are over 80. There is one person in Ingenbohl who is over 100 years old.

As of 2000 there are 2,899 households, of which 892 households (or about 30.8%) contain only a single individual. 148 or about 5.1% are large households, with at least five members.

In the 2007 election the most popular party was the SVP which received 38.1% of the vote. The next three most popular parties were the CVP (29.4%), the SPS (16.1%) and the FDP (12.2%).

The entire Swiss population is generally well educated. In Ingenbohl about 68.5% of the population (between age 25-64) have completed either non-mandatory upper secondary education or additional higher education (either university or a Fachhochschule).

Ingenbohl has an unemployment rate of 1.8%. As of 2005, there were 109 people employed in the primary economic sector and about 39 businesses involved in this sector. 452 people are employed in the secondary sector and there are 61 businesses in this sector. 2,127 people are employed in the tertiary sector, with 272 businesses in this sector.

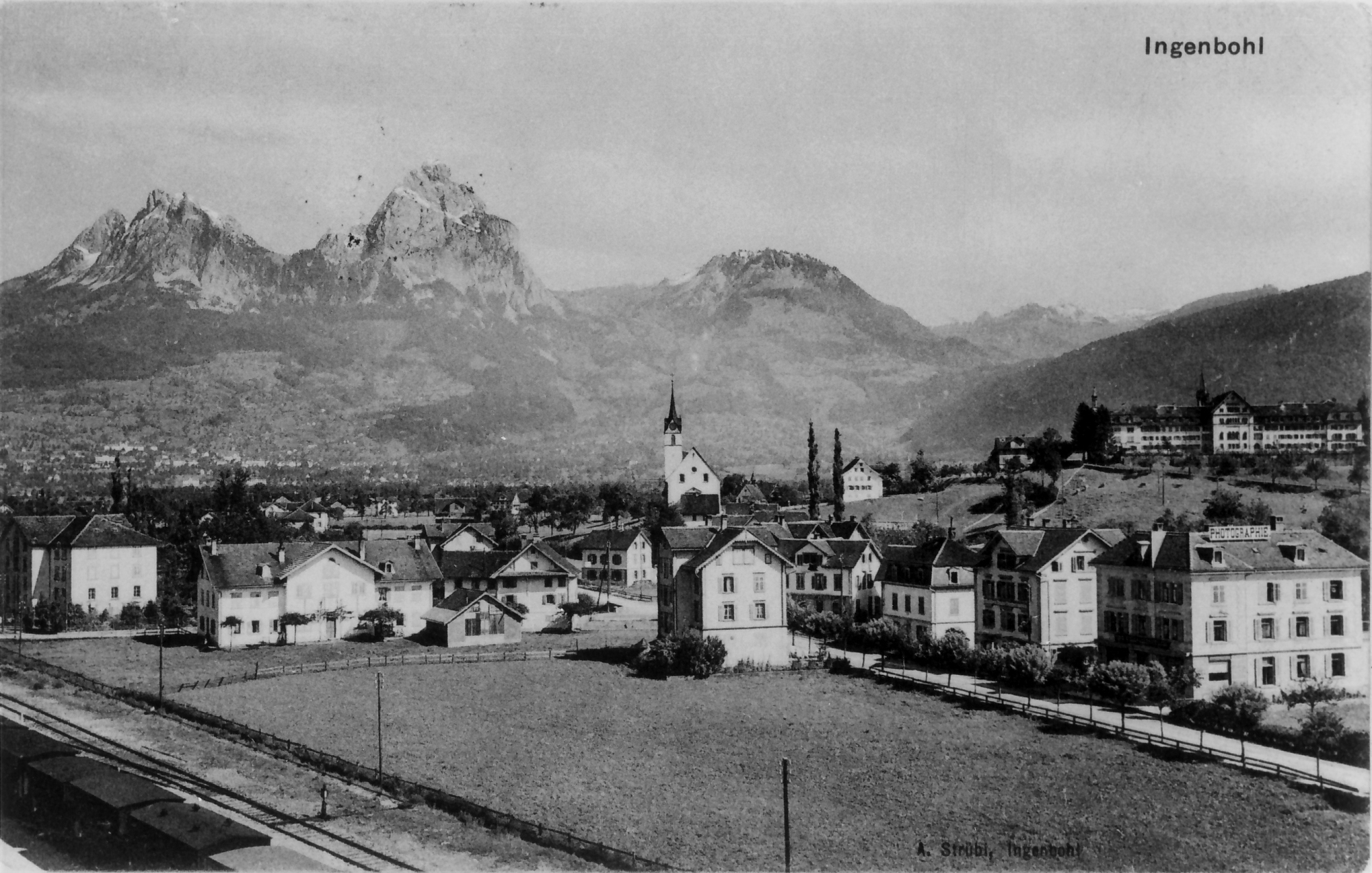
Ingenbohl village with the Mythen mountain in the background, picture from about 1900

From the 2000 census, 5,813 or 77.7% are Roman Catholic, while 661 or 8.8% belonged to the Swiss Reformed Church. Of the rest of the population, there are 5 individuals (or about 0.07% of the population) who belong to the Christian Catholic faith, there are 191 individuals (or about 2.55% of the population) who belong to the Orthodox Church, and there are less than 5 individuals who belong to another Christian church. There are 5 individuals (or about 0.07% of the population) who are Jewish, and 276 (or about 3.69% of the population) who are Islamic. There are 59 individuals (or about 0.79% of the population) who belong to another church (not listed on the census), 300 (or about 4.01% of the population) belong to no church, are agnostic or atheist, and 168 individuals (or about 2.25% of the population) did not answer the question.

The historical population is given in the following table:

year	population
1850	1,548
1900	3,070
1950	4,442
1980	6,232
2000	7,482
2005	7,863
2007	8,209

== Transport ==
Brunnen railway station, on the Gotthard railway, is served by hourly InterRegio trains, and by lines S2 of the Stadtbahn Zug, which operates hourly between Zug, Arth-Goldau and Erstfeld, and S3 of the S-Bahn Luzern, which operates hourly to Lucerne.
