= Illgau =

- Municipality
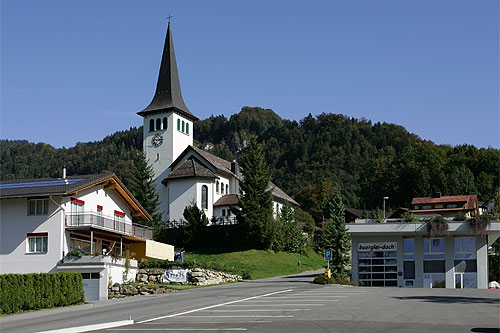

- Coat of arms
- Location of Illgau
- Location within Switzerland Location within Canton of Schwyz
- Coordinates: 46°59′N 8°43′E
- Country: Switzerland
- Canton: Schwyz
- District: Schwyz

Area
  - Total: 10.9 km^{2} (4.2 sq mi)
- Elevation: 807 m (2,648 ft)

Population (December 2020)
  - Total: 795
  - Density: 72.9/km^{2} (189/sq mi)
- Time zone: UTC+01:00 (CET)
  - Summer (DST): UTC+02:00 (CEST)
- Postal code: 6434
- SFOS number: 1363
- ISO 3166 code: CH-SZ
- Surrounded by: Muotathal, Oberiberg, Schwyz
- Website: www.illgau.ch

Illgau is a municipality in Schwyz District in the canton of Schwyz in Switzerland.

== History ==
Illgau is first mentioned in 1370 as Ilgoe.

== Geography ==
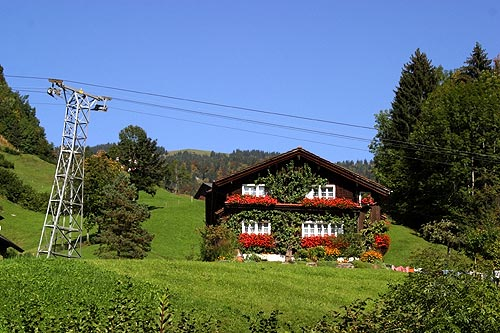
Farm house in Illgau, with a tower of the aerial tramway Illgau - St.Karl

Aerial view from 2300 m by Walter Mittelholzer (1928)

Illgau has an area, as of 2006, of 10.9 km^{2} (4.2 sq mi). Of this area, 62% is used for agricultural purposes, while 31.1% is forested. Of the rest of the land, 2.9% is settled (buildings or roads) and the remainder (4%) is non-productive (rivers, glaciers or mountains).

It consists of the village sections of Illgau, Vorder Oberberg and Hinter Oberberg as well as scattered farm houses. All of the farm houses, up to about the 1,300 m (4,300 ft) level are occupied throughout the year.

== Demographics ==
Illgau has a population (as of 31 December 2020) of 795. As of 2007, 1.6% of the population was made up of foreign nationals. Over the last 10 years the population has grown at a rate of 7%. Most of the population (as of 2000) speaks German (99.2%), with Albanian being second most common ( 0.3%) and Russian being third ( 0.3%).

As of 2000 the gender distribution of the population was 50.8% male and 49.2% female. The age distribution, as of 2008, in Illgau is; 242 people or 33.6% of the population is between 0 and 19. 241 people or 33.4% are 20 to 39, and 166 people or 23.0% are 40 to 64. The senior population distribution is 45 people or 6.2% are 65 to 74. There are 19 people or 2.6% who are 70 to 79 and 8 people or 1.11% of the population who are over 80.

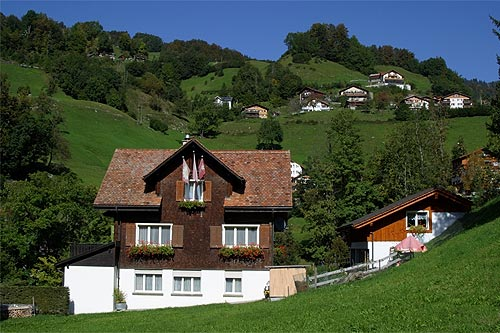

As of 2000 there are 248 households, of which 71 households (or about 28.6%) contain only a single individual. 31 or about 12.5% are large households, with at least five members.

In the 2007 election the most popular party was the SVP which received 53.9% of the vote. The next three most popular parties were the CVP (36.4%), the SPS (5.5%) and the FDP (1.7%).

The entire Swiss population is generally well educated. In Illgau about 55.2% of the population (between age 25-64) have completed either non-mandatory upper secondary education or additional higher education (either university or a Fachhochschule).

Illgau has an unemployment rate of 0.96%. As of 2005, there were 70 people employed in the primary economic sector and about 28 businesses involved in this sector. 63 people are employed in the secondary sector and there are 8 businesses in this sector. 71 people are employed in the tertiary sector, with 14 businesses in this sector.

From the 2000 census, 698 or 96.8% are Roman Catholic, while less than 5 people belonged to the Swiss Reformed Church. There are 6 (or about 0.83% of the population) who are Islamic. 9 (or about 1.25% of the population) belong to no church, are agnostic or atheist, and 6 individuals (or about 0.83% of the population) did not answer the question.

The historical population is given in the following table:

year	population
1850	246
1900	270
1950	390
1990	633
2000	721
2005	776
2007	792
