= Schwyz District =

Coordinates: 47°01′N 8°39′E

Schwyz District Bezirk Schwyz
- District
- Country: Switzerland
- Canton: Schwyz
- Capital: Schwyz

Area
  - Total: 506.4 km^{2} (195.5 sq mi)

Population (December 2020)
  - Total: 56,125
  - Density: 110.8/km^{2} (287.1/sq mi)
- Time zone: UTC+1 (CET)
  - Summer (DST): UTC+2 (CEST)
- Municipalities: 15

Schwyz District is a district of the canton of Schwyz, Switzerland. It is both the largest and most populous of the six districts of the canton of Schwyz, accounting for around half its surface area, and 40% of the population. It has a population of 56,125 (as of 31 December 2020).

The district contains a total of 15 municipalities, of which the town of Schwyz is the capital.

Coat of arms	Municipality	Population (31 December 2020)	Area, km^{2}
Alpthal	Alpthal	613	22.9
Arth	Arth	12,184	48.6
Illgau	Illgau	795	10.9
Ingenbohl	Ingenbohl	8,977	16.2
Lauerz	Lauerz	1,136	9.2
Morschach	Morschach	1,151	20.8
Muotathal	Muotathal	3,470	172.2
Oberiberg	Oberiberg	878	32.8
Riemenstalden	Riemenstalden	86	11.2
Rothenthurm	Rothenthurm	2,484	22.8
Sattel	Sattel	1,925	17.3
Schwyz	Schwyz	15,435	53.2
Steinen	Steinen	3,624	11.9
Steinerberg	Steinerberg	953	6.9
Unteriberg	Unteriberg	2,414	46.7
	Total	56,125	503.6
