= Lauerz =

- Municipality
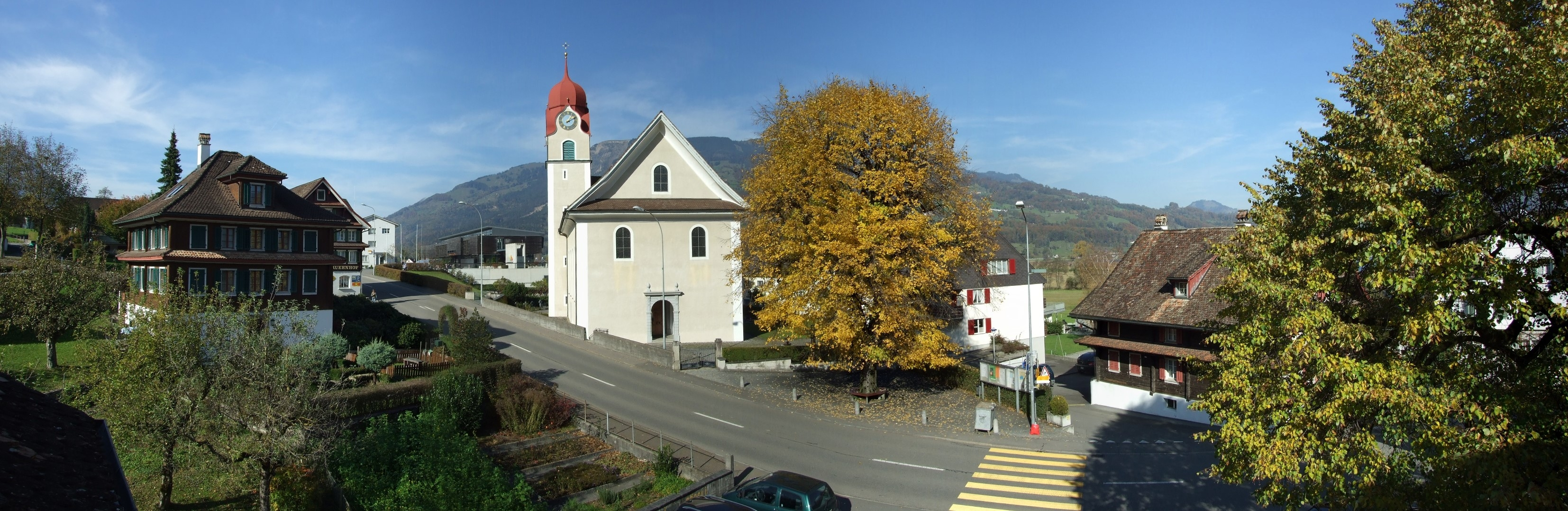

- Coat of arms
- Location of Lauerz
- Location within Switzerland Location within Canton of Schwyz
- Coordinates: 47°2′N 8°34′E
- Country: Switzerland
- Canton: Schwyz
- District: Schwyz

Area
  - Total: 9.20 km^{2} (3.55 sq mi)
- Elevation: 457 m (1,499 ft)

Population (December 2020)
  - Total: 1,136
  - Density: 123/km^{2} (320/sq mi)
- Time zone: UTC+01:00 (CET)
  - Summer (DST): UTC+02:00 (CEST)
- Postal code: 6424
- SFOS number: 1365
- ISO 3166 code: CH-SZ
- Surrounded by: Arth, Gersau, Ingenbohl, Steinen, Steinerberg, Schwyz
- Website: www.lauerz.ch

Lauerz is a village and municipality in the Schwyz District of the canton of Schwyz in Switzerland. It adjoins Lake Lauerz (Lauerzersee).

== History ==
Lauerz is first mentioned in 1306 as Lowertz.

In September 1806, the village was very badly affected by the tsunami that followed the landslide at Goldau, resulting in the deaths of 115 people in Lauerz alone.

== Geography ==
Aerial view (1960)

The village of Lauerz is situated on the south shore of Lake Lauerz (Lauerzersee). The municipality consists of the village of Lauerz and a number of scattered farm houses between the northern slope of the Rigi mountain and the lake. A section of the lake, together with both of its islands, Schwanau and Roggenburg, are also within the municipality.

The municipality of Lauerz has an area, as of 2006, of 9.2 km^{2} (3.6 sq mi). Of this area, 44.7% is used for agricultural purposes, while 35.7% is forested. Of the rest of the land, 4.1% is settled (buildings or roads) and the remainder (15.5%) is non-productive (rivers, glaciers or mountains).

== Demographics ==
Lauerz has a population (as of 31 December 2020) of 1,136. As of 2007, 6.7% of the population was made up of foreign nationals. Over the last 10 years the population has grown at a rate of 15.2%. Most of the population (as of 2000) speaks German (97.1%), with English being second most common ( 0.9%) and Albanian being third ( 0.8%).

As of 2000 the gender distribution of the population was 51.5% male and 48.5% female. The age distribution, as of 2008, in Lauerz is; 266 people or 30.4% of the population is between 0 and 19. 255 people or 29.2% are 20 to 39, and 261 people or 29.9% are 40 to 64. The senior population distribution is 60 people or 6.9% are 65 to 74. There are 20 people or 2.3% who are 70 to 79 and 12 people or 1.37% of the population who are over 80.

As of 2000 there are 306 households, of which 70 households (or about 22.9%) contain only a single individual. 35 or about 11.4% are large households, with at least five members.

In the 2007 election the most popular party was the SVP which received 52% of the vote. The next three most popular parties were the CVP (22.7%), the FDP (13.5%) and the SPS (10.4%).

The entire Swiss population is generally well educated. In Lauerz about 64% of the population (between age 25–64) have completed either non-mandatory upper secondary education or additional higher education (either university or a Fachhochschule).

Lauerz has an unemployment rate of 0.76%. As of 2005, there were 73 people employed in the primary economic sector and about 29 businesses involved in this sector. 55 people are employed in the secondary sector and there are 10 businesses in this sector. 83 people are employed in the tertiary sector, with 19 businesses in this sector.

From the 2000 census, 731 or 83.6% are Roman Catholic, while 71 or 8.1% belonged to the Swiss Reformed Church. There are 7 (or about 0.80% of the population) who are Islamic. 49 (or about 5.61% of the population) belong to no church, are agnostic or atheist, and 16 individuals (or about 1.83% of the population) did not answer the question.

The historical population is given in the following table:

year	population
1850	474
1900	436
1950	549
1985	651
2000	867
2005	943
2007	1,000
