= Wildspitz =

Mountain of the Alps in Schwyz Canton, Switzerland

Rossberg
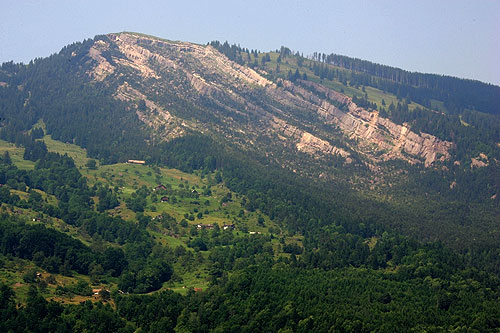
- The west side

Highest point
- Peak: Wildspitz
- Elevation: 1,580 m (5,180 ft)
- Prominence: 780 m (2,560 ft)
- Isolation: 7.3 km (4.5 mi)
- Listing: Canton high point
- Coordinates: 47°5′3.1″N 8°34′39.9″E

Geography
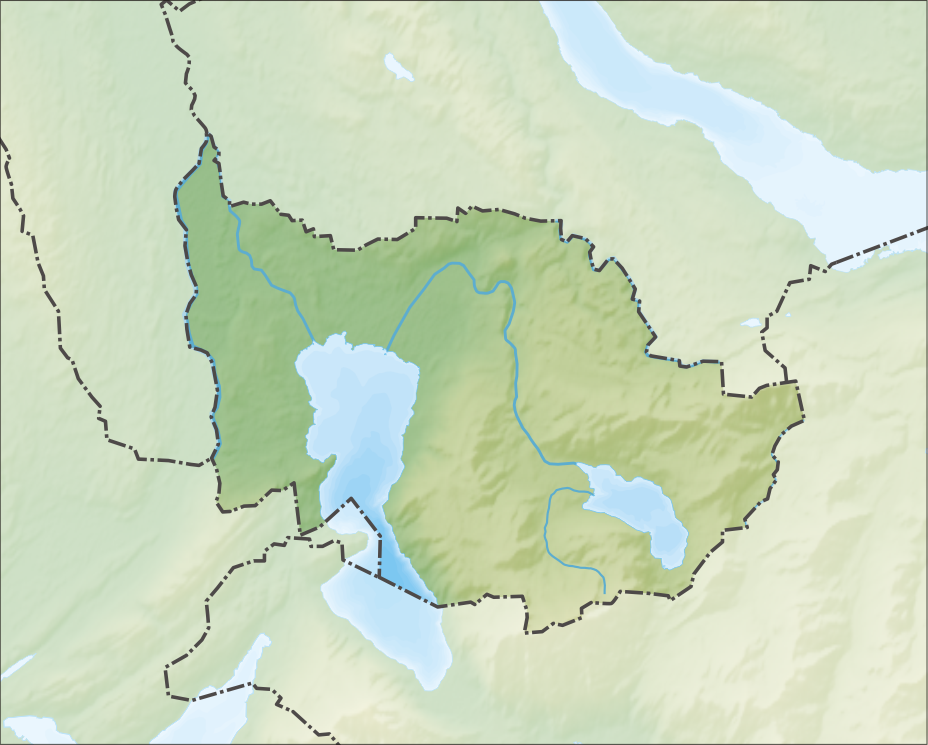
- Location within Switzerland Location within Canton of Schwyz Location within Canton of Zug
- Country: Switzerland
- Cantons: Schwyz and Zug
- Parent range: Schwyzer Alps
- Topo map: Swiss Federal Office of Topography swisstopo

The Wildspitz is the highest summit of the Rossberg, a mountain of the Schwyzer Alps, located on the border between the Swiss cantons of Zug and Schwyz. Reaching a height of 1,580 metres (5,180 ft) above sea level, it is the highest summit in the canton of Zug.

The Wildspitz is surrounded by three lakes: Lake Zug, Lake Lauerz and Lake Ägeri.

== See also ==
- List of mountains of the canton of Schwyz
