= List of mountains of Nidwalden =

This is a list of mountains of the Swiss canton of Nidwalden. The list only includes significant summits with a topographic prominence of at least 150 metres (492 ft). There are 18 such summits in Nidwalden and they are found in almost all its municipalities. Topographically, the three most important summits of the canton are those of the Rotstöckli (most elevated), the Bürgenstock (most prominent) and Pilatus (most isolated).

The Rotstöckli (2,901 m), although the highest point of the canton, is not listed as it is a subsidiary peak of the Titlis (3,238 m) and has a topographic prominence of less than 50 m. All mountain heights and prominences on the list are from the largest-scale maps available.

== List ==
| Mountain | Height (m) | Drop (m) | Coordinates | Range | Municipality(ies) | First ascent |
|---|---|---|---|---|---|---|
| Ruchstock | 2814 | 255 | 46°51′24″N 08°28′14″E | Uri Alps | Wolfenschiessen | |
| Rotsandnollen | 2700 | 493 | 46°48′02″N 08°20′38″E | Uri Alps | Wolfenschiessen | |
| Huetstock | 2676 | 230 | 46°48′53″N 09°19′34″E | Uri Alps | Wolfenschiessen | |
| Graustock | 2662 | 256 | 46°47′16″N 08°22′08″E | Uri Alps | Wolfenschiessen | |
| Gross Sättelistock | 2637 | 272 | 46°51′09″N 08°26′11″E | Uri Alps | Wolfenschiessen | |
| Hoh Brisen | 2413 | 489 | 46°53′51″N 08°27′57″E | Uri Alps | Wolfenschiessen | |
| Nünalphorn | 2385 | 214 | 46°49′26″N 08°19′32″E | Uri Alps | Wolfenschiessen | |
| Pilatus (Tomlishorn) | 2128 | 585 | 46°55′42″N 08°43′43″E | Emmental Alps | Hergiswil | |
| Oberbauenstock | 2117 | 297 | 46°55′40″N 08°32′39″E | Uri Alps | Emmetten | |
| Schluchberg | 2106 | 364 | 46°52′00″N 08°20′02″E | Uri Alps | Wolfenschiessen | |
| Niderbauen-Chulm | 1923 | 327 | 46°56′51″N 08°33′24″E | Uri Alps | Emmetten | |
| Stanserhorn | 1898 | 500 | 46°55′47″N 08°20′25″E | Uri Alps | Dallenwil/Ennetmoos | |
| Buochserhorn | 1807 | 227 | 46°56′44″N 08°25′43″E | Uri Alps | Beckenried/Buochs/Oberdorf | |
| Bürgenstock | 1128 | 683 | 47°00′01″N 08°23′55″E | Uri Alps | Ennetbürgen | |

== See also ==
- List of mountains of Switzerland
- Swiss Alps
