= List of mountains of Obwalden =

This is a list of mountains of the Swiss canton of Obwalden. Obwalden is a very mountainous canton and is one of the nine cantons having summits over 3,000 metres. Topographically, the three most important summits of the canton are those of the Titlis (most elevated), the Brienzer Rothorn (most prominent) and Pilatus (most isolated).

This list only includes significant summits with a topographic prominence of at least 150 metres (492 ft). There are 28 such summits in Obwalden and they are found in all its seven municipalities. All mountain heights and prominences on the list are from the largest-scale maps available.

== List ==
Mountain	Height (m)	Drop (m)	Coordinates	Range	Municipality(ies)	First ascent
Titlis	3238	978	46°46′19″N 08°26′16″E	Uri Alps	Engelberg	1739
Reissend Nollen	3003	229	46°46′00″N 08°24′03″E	Uri Alps	Engelberg	
Grassen	2946	215	2'677'134.73, 1'179'639.02	Uri Alps	Engelberg	
Wissigstock	2887	329	46°50′44″N 08°30′24″E	Uri Alps	Engelberg	
Rotsandnollen	2700	493	46°48′02″N 08°20′38″E	Uri Alps	Kerns	
Huetstock	2676	230	46°48′53″N 09°19′34″E	Uri Alps	Kerns	
Graustock	2662	256	46°47′16″N 08°22′08″E	Uri Alps	Kerns	
Gross Sättelistock	2637	272	46°51′09″N 08°26′11″E	Uri Alps	Engelberg	
Hahnen	2606	201	46°49′26″N 08°27′20″E	Uri Alps	Engelberg	
Glogghüs	2534	554	46°45′38″N 08°15′45″E	Uri Alps	Kerns	
Hochstollen	2481	160	46°46′25″N 08°14′16″E	Uri Alps	Lungern/Kerns	
Nünalphorn	2385	214	46°49′26″N 08°19′32″E	Uri Alps	Kerns	
Brienzer Rothorn	2350	1342	46°47′13″N 08°02′49″E	Emmental Alps	Giswil	
Heitlistock	2146	284	46°48′39″N 08°15′02″E	Uri Alps	Sachseln	
Pilatus (Tomlishorn)	2128	585	46°55′42″N 08°43′43″E	Emmental Alps	Alpnach	
Chingstuel	2118	190	46°46′10″N 08°12′24″E	Uri Alps	Lungern	
Schluchberg	2106	364	46°52′00″N 08°20′02″E	Uri Alps	Kerns	
Güpfi	2043	381	46°47′46″N 08°11′43″E	Uri Alps	Lungern	
Fürstein	2040	481	46°53′44″N 08°04′11″E	Emmental Alps	Sarnen	
Hagleren	1949	365	46°37′21″N 07°15′02″E	Emmental Alps	Giswil	
Stäfeliflue	1922	227	46°57′53″N 08°09′52″E	Emmental Alps	Alpnach	
Mittaggüpfi	1917	167	46°58′18″N 08°11′15″E	Emmental Alps	Alpnach	

== See also ==
- List of mountains of Switzerland
- Swiss Alps
