= Pilatus (mountain) =

Mountain in Switzerland

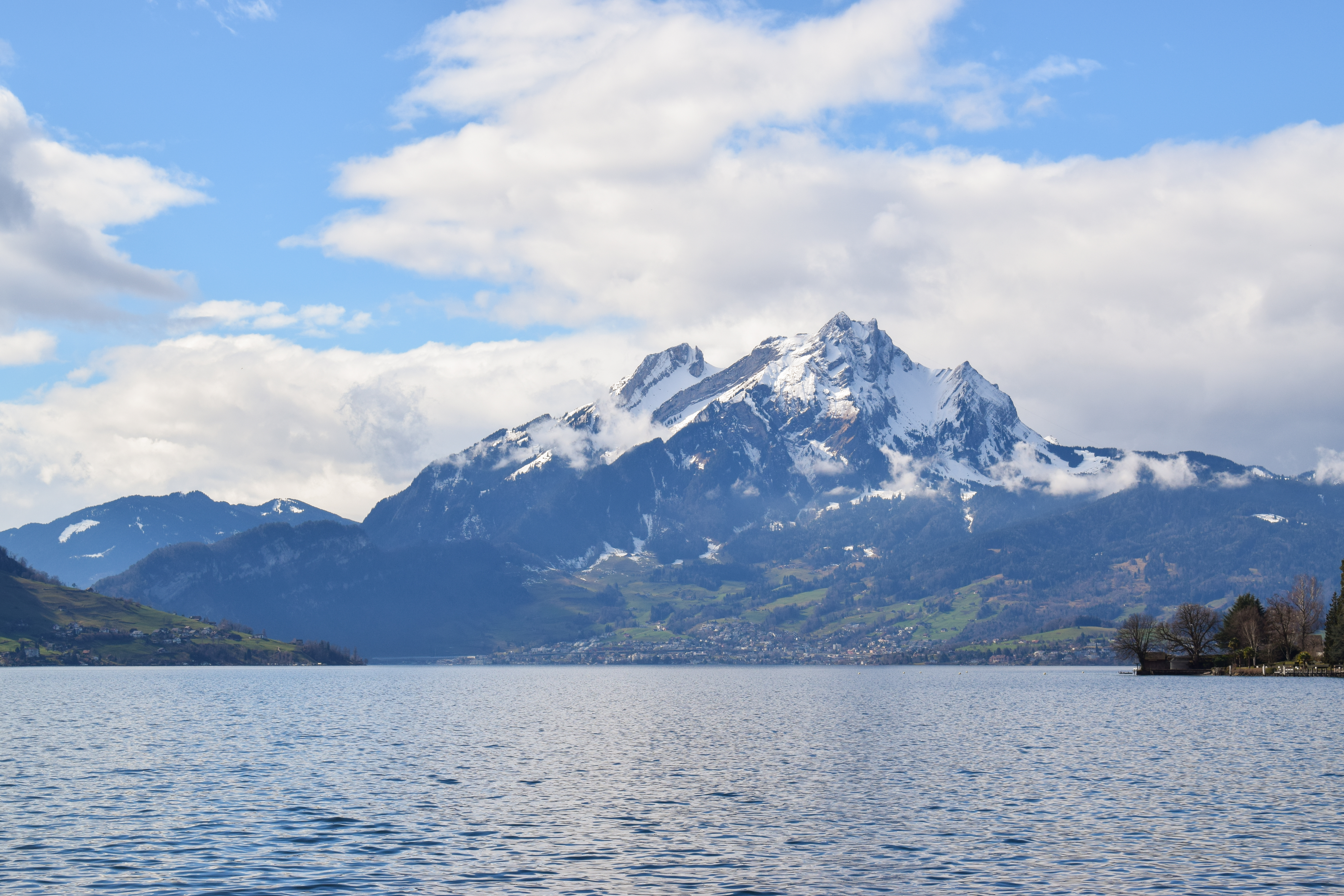
- Pilatus above Lake Lucerne

Highest point
- Peak: Tomlishorn
- Elevation: 2,128.5 m (6,983 ft)
- Prominence: 585 m (1,919 ft)
- Parent peak: Brienzer Rothorn
- Isolation: 16.7 km (10.4 mi)
- Coordinates: 46°58′26″N 8°14′28″E

Naming
- Language of name: German

Geography
- Location within Switzerland
- Country: Switzerland
- Cantons: Nidwalden; Obwalden
- Parent range: Emmental Alps
- Topo map: Swiss Federal Office of Topography swisstopo

Climbing
- First ascent: 14th century
- Easiest route: Pilatus Railway (world's steepest cogwheel railway)

Pilatus, also often referred to as Mount Pilatus, is a mountain massif overlooking Lucerne in Central Switzerland. It is composed of several peaks, of which the highest (2,128.5 m [6,983 ft]) is named Tomlishorn.

== Geography and transport ==
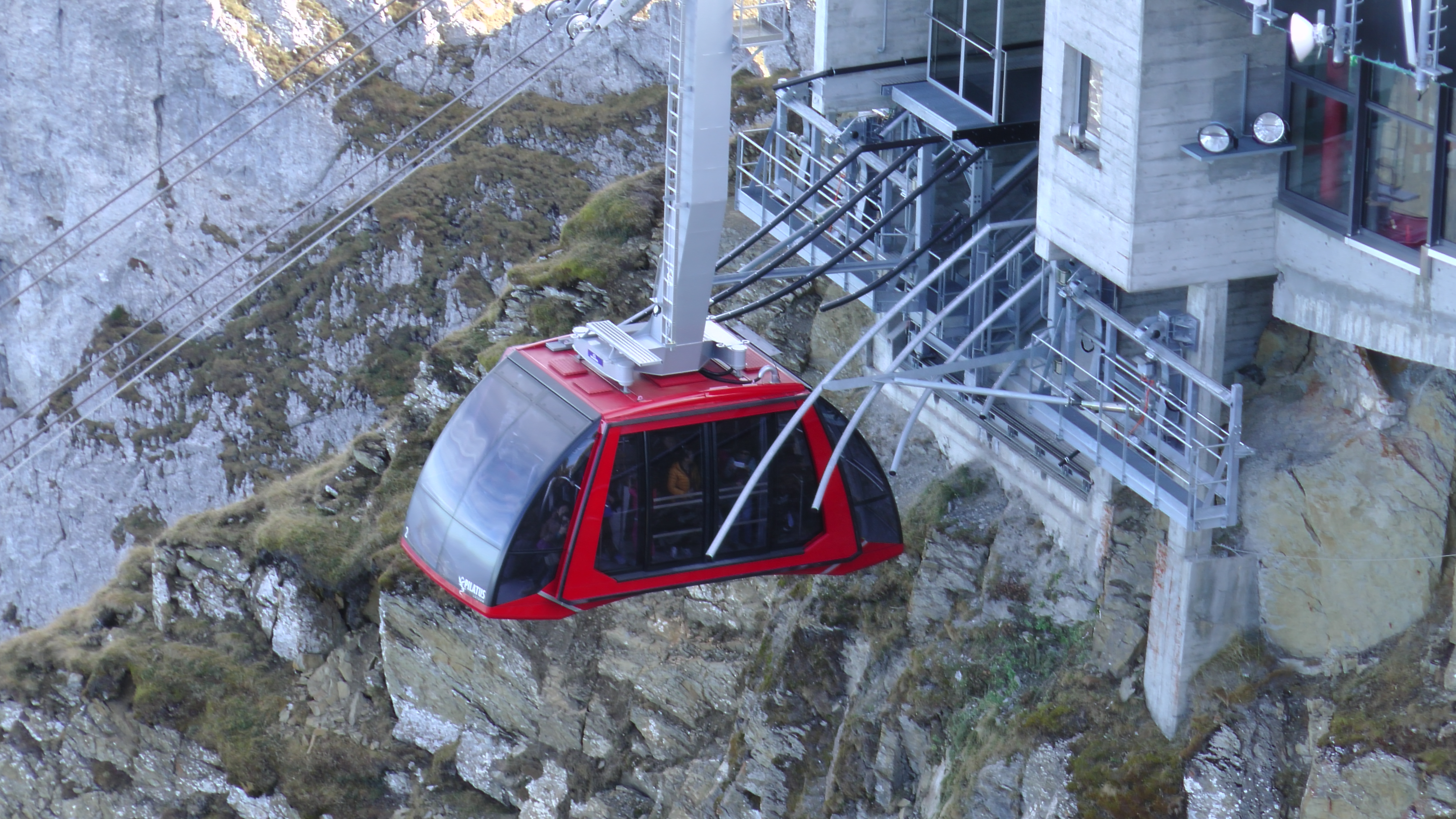
Newest aerial cable car (called Dragon Ride) arriving at top station of Pilatus

The whole mountain range stretches at least from the Lopper just opposite from Stansstad to the east as far as at least to the Mittaggüpfi (1,917 m [6,289 ft]) and the Risetestock (1,759 m [5,771 ft]) to the west on the border between LU and OW.

The highest peak, Tomlishorn (2,128.5 m [6,983 ft]), and the other peaks, such as Widderfeld (2,076 m [6,811 ft]) even further west than the Tomlishorn on the border between LU and OW, Matthorn (2,040 m [6,690 ft]) to the south, the Klimsenhorn (1,906 m [6,253 ft]) to the north (NW), and Rosegg (1,974 m [6,476 ft]) and Windegg (1,673 m [5,489 ft]) to the east, both on the border of NW and OW, should only be approached with appropriate Alpine hiking equipment.

Jurisdiction over the massif is divided between the cantons of Obwalden (OW), Nidwalden (NW), and Lucerne (LU). The main peaks are right on the border between Obwalden and Nidwalden.

The top can be reached with the Pilatus Railway, the world's steepest cogwheel railway, from Alpnachstad, operating from May to November (depending on snow conditions) and the whole year with the aerial panorama gondolas and aerial cableways from Kriens. Tomlishorn is located about 1.3 km (0.81 mi) to the southeast of the top cable car and cog railway station. Two other peaks, closer to the stations are called Esel (Donkey, 2,118 m [6,949 ft]), which lies just east over the railway station, the one on the west side is called Oberhaupt (Head-Leader, 2,105 m [6,906 ft]).

During the summer, the "Golden Round Trip" — a popular route for tourists — involves taking a boat from Lucerne across Lake Lucerne to Alpnachstad, going up on the cogwheel railway, coming down on the aerial cableways and panorama gondolas, and taking a trolleybus back to Lucerne.

== History ==
A few different local legends about the origin of the name exist. One claims that Pilatus was named so because Pontius Pilate was buried there. However, a similar legend is told of Monte Vettore in Italy. Another is that the mountain looks like the belly of a large man, Pilate, lying on his back and was thus named for him. The name may also be derived from "pileatus", meaning "cloud-topped."

Numbered amongst those who have reached its summit are Conrad Gessner, Theodore Roosevelt, Arthur Schopenhauer (1804), Queen Victoria and Julia Ward Howe (1867).

The cog railway opened in 1889. That same year, Leonardo Torres Quevedo presented his innovative cable car project for public transport, but it was dismissed by the country's authorities.

The mountain has fortified radar (part of the Swiss FLORAKO system) and weather stations on the Oberhaupt summit, not open to the public view and used all year round.

== Gallery ==
Alphorn musicians play on summit, as a paraglider fades into the clouds

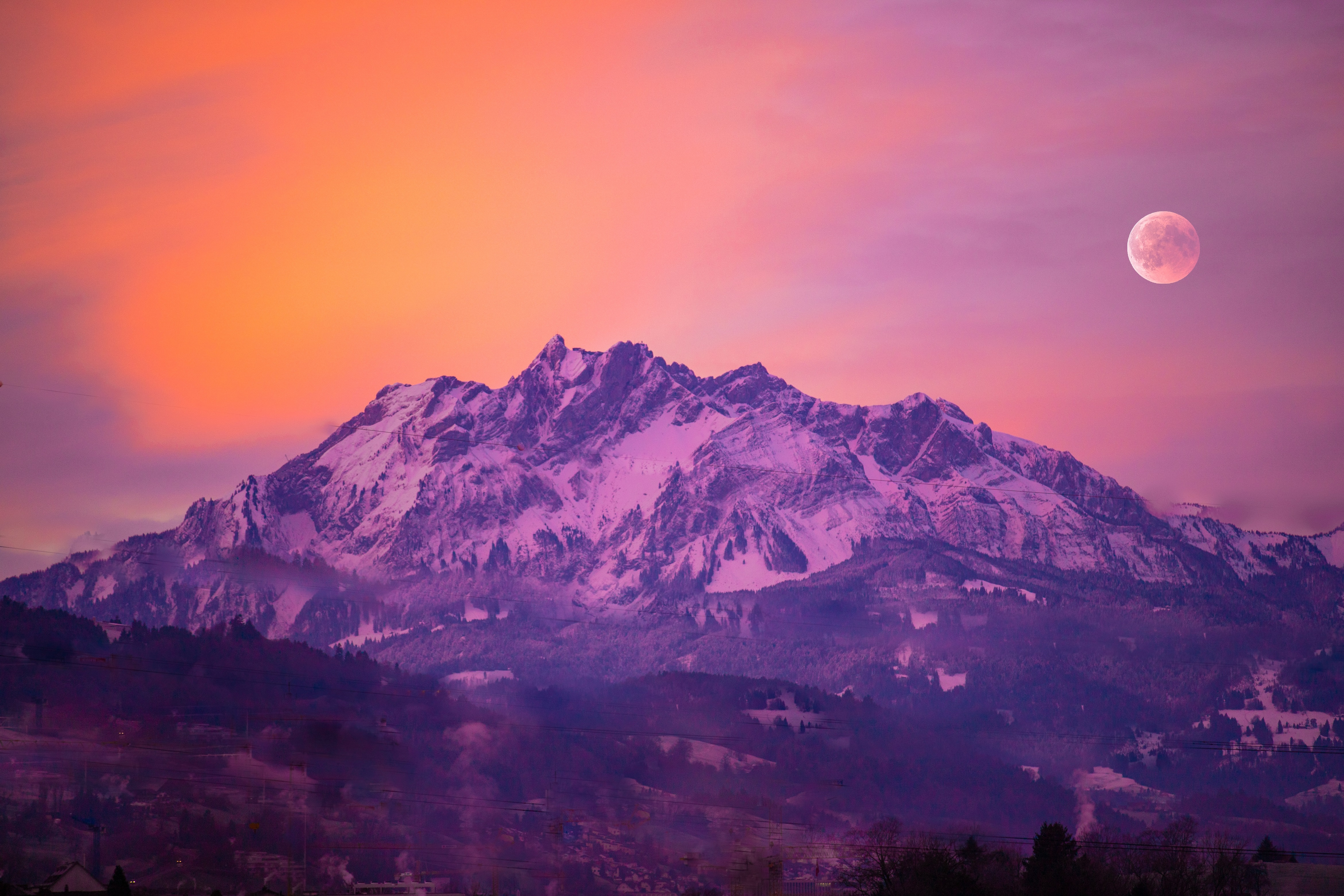
Pilatus mountain seen from Gisikon Root

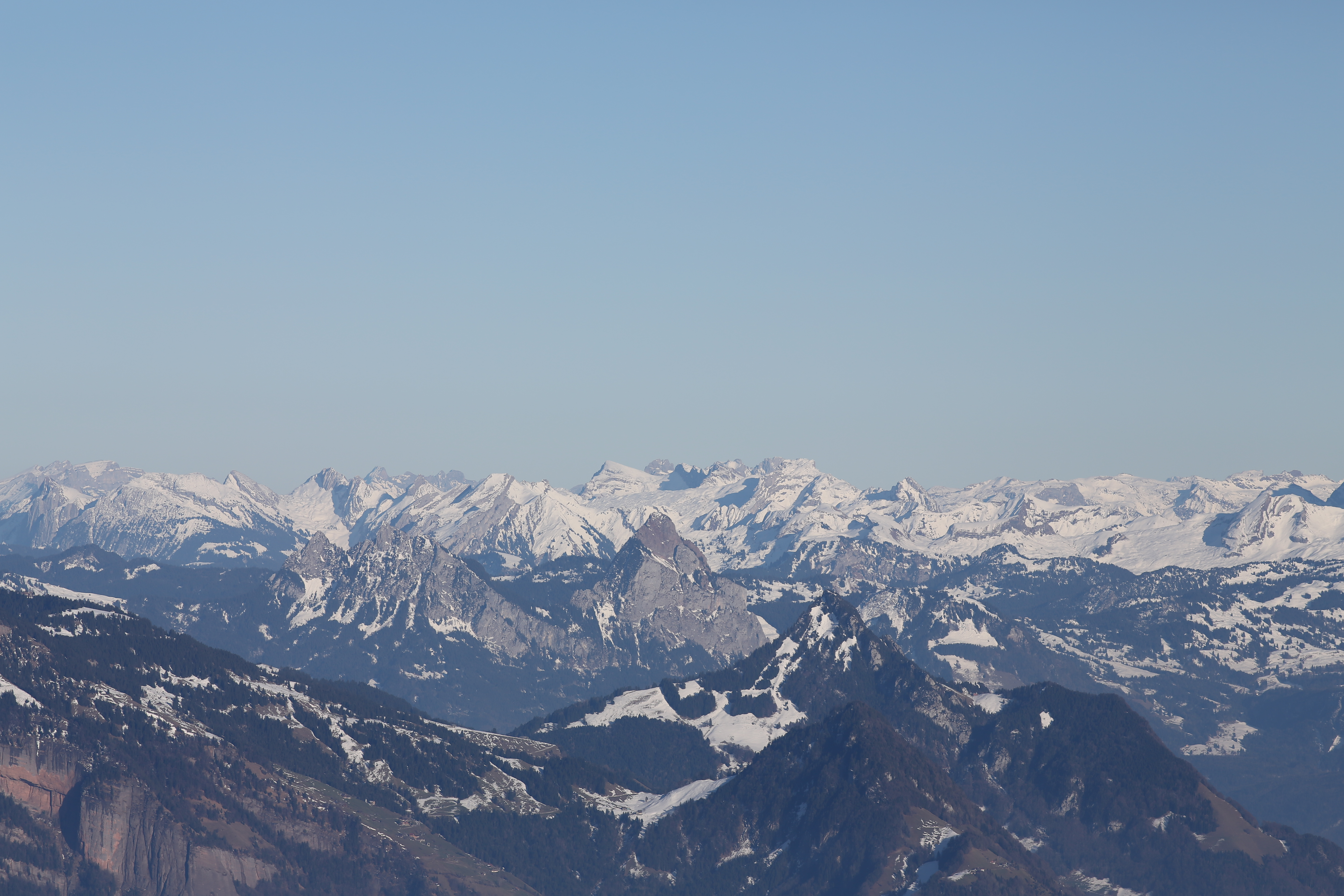
Panoramic view towards Mythen

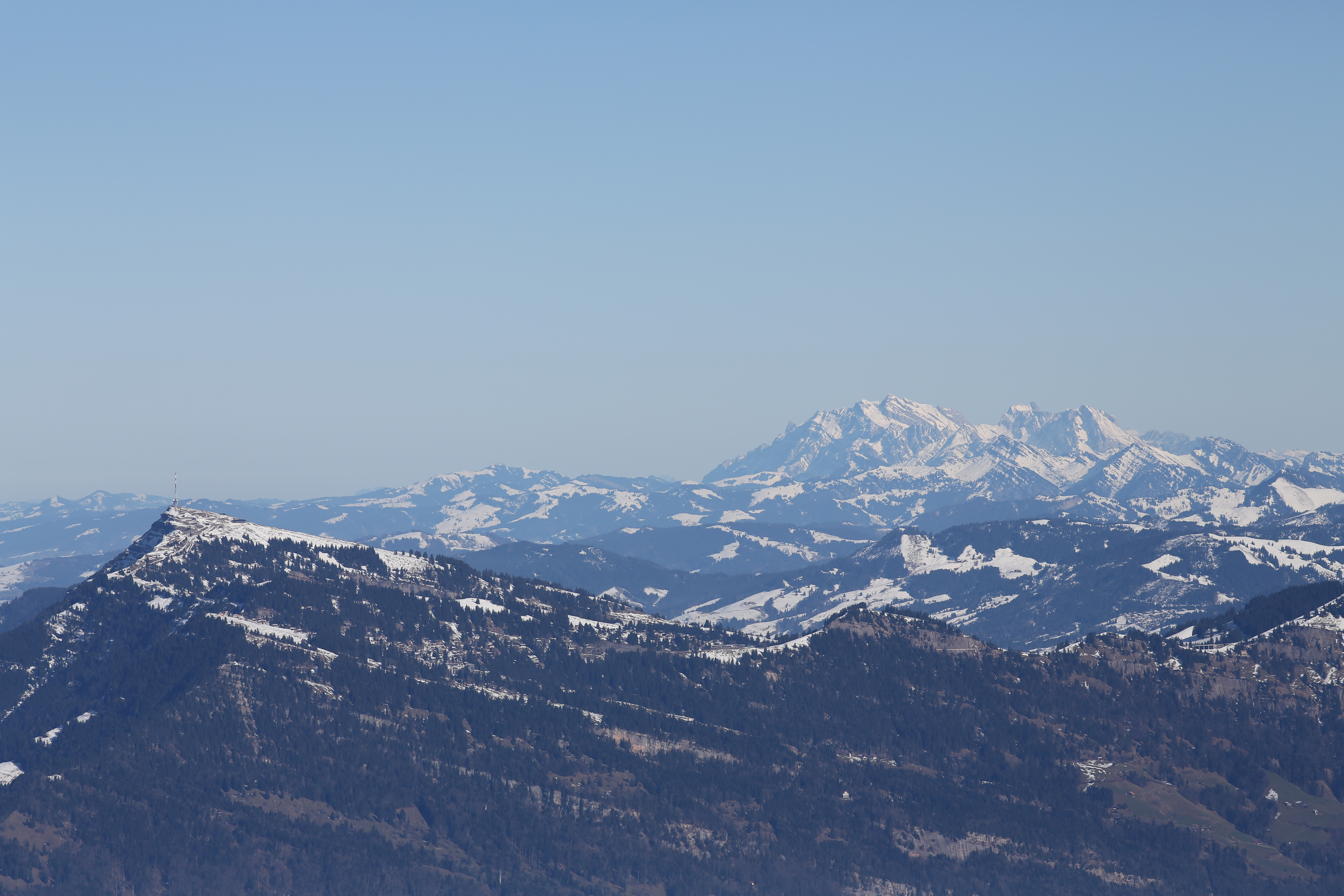
View on Rigi and Säntis in the background

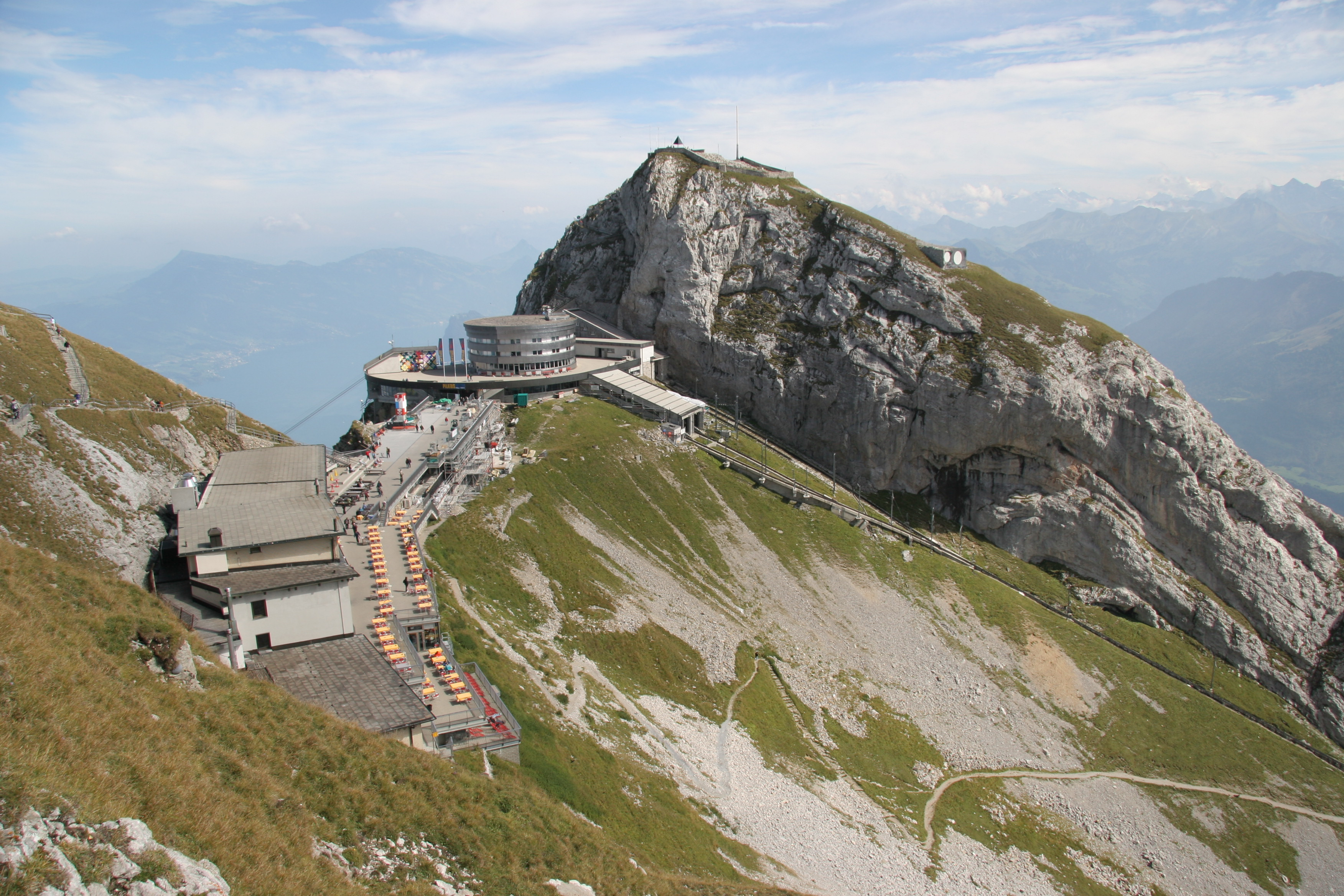
A view of the Hotel and Restaurant, the cog railway top station, and the Esel peak in the back

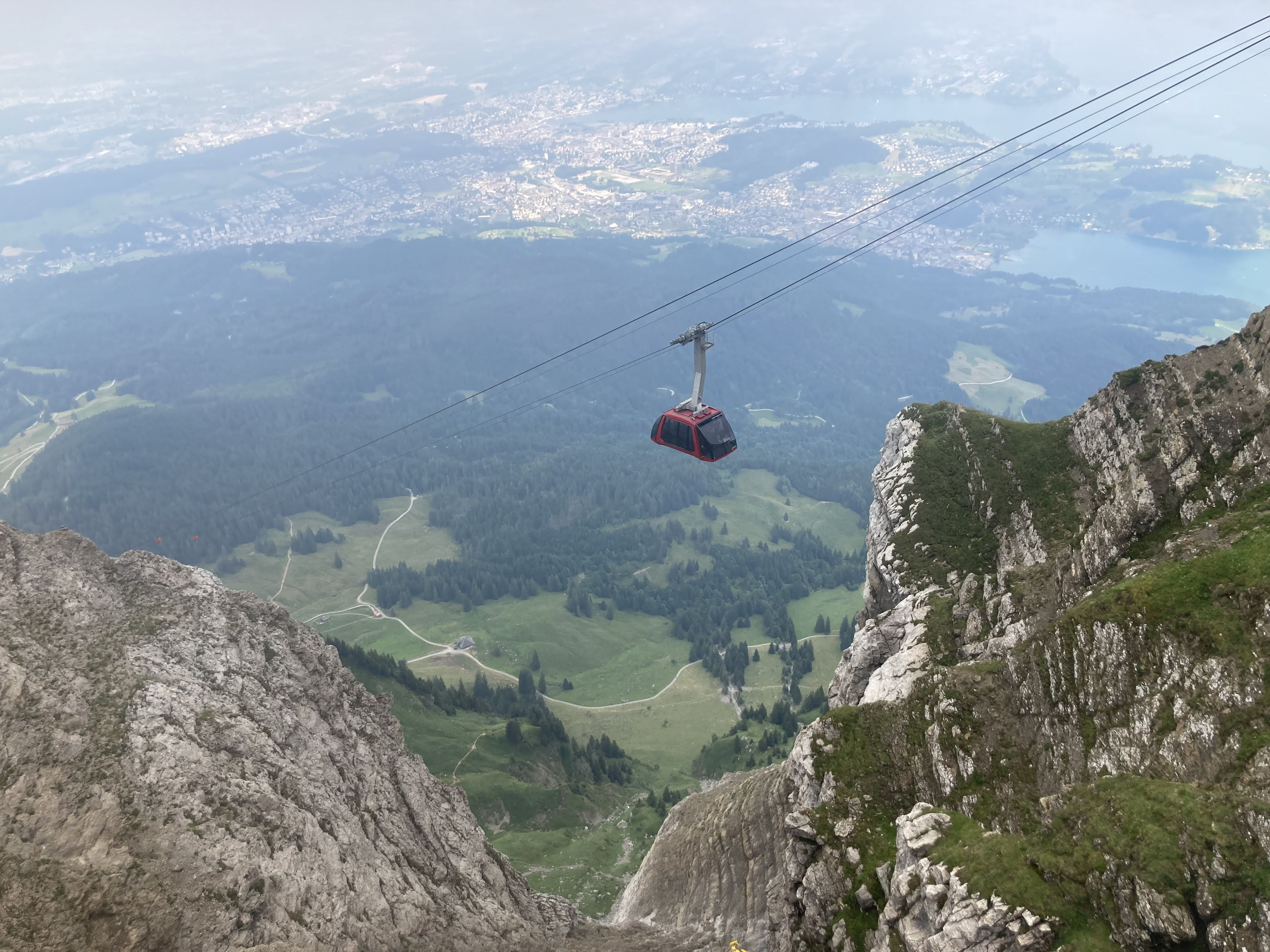
Cable car descending

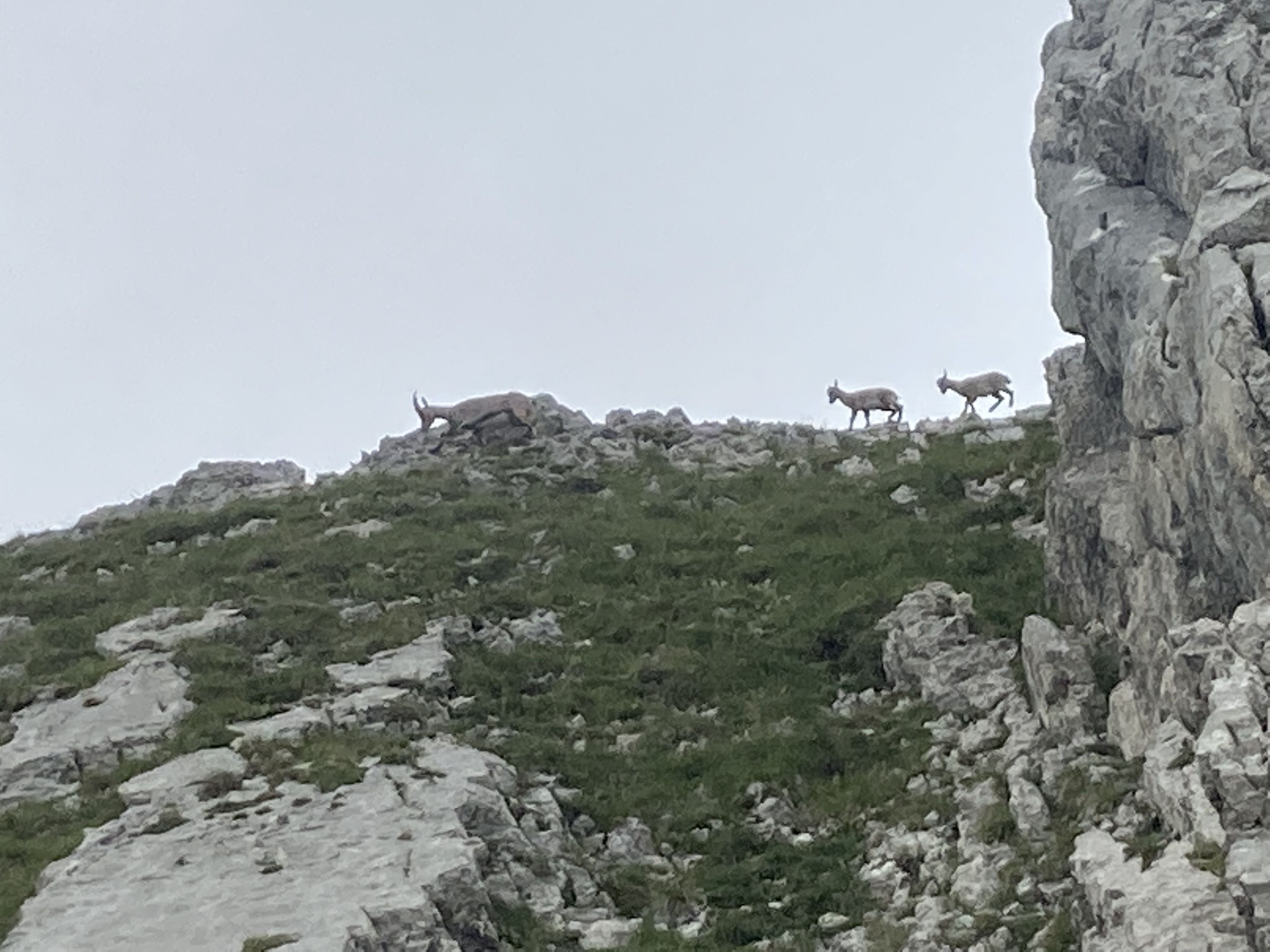
Ibex family near summit

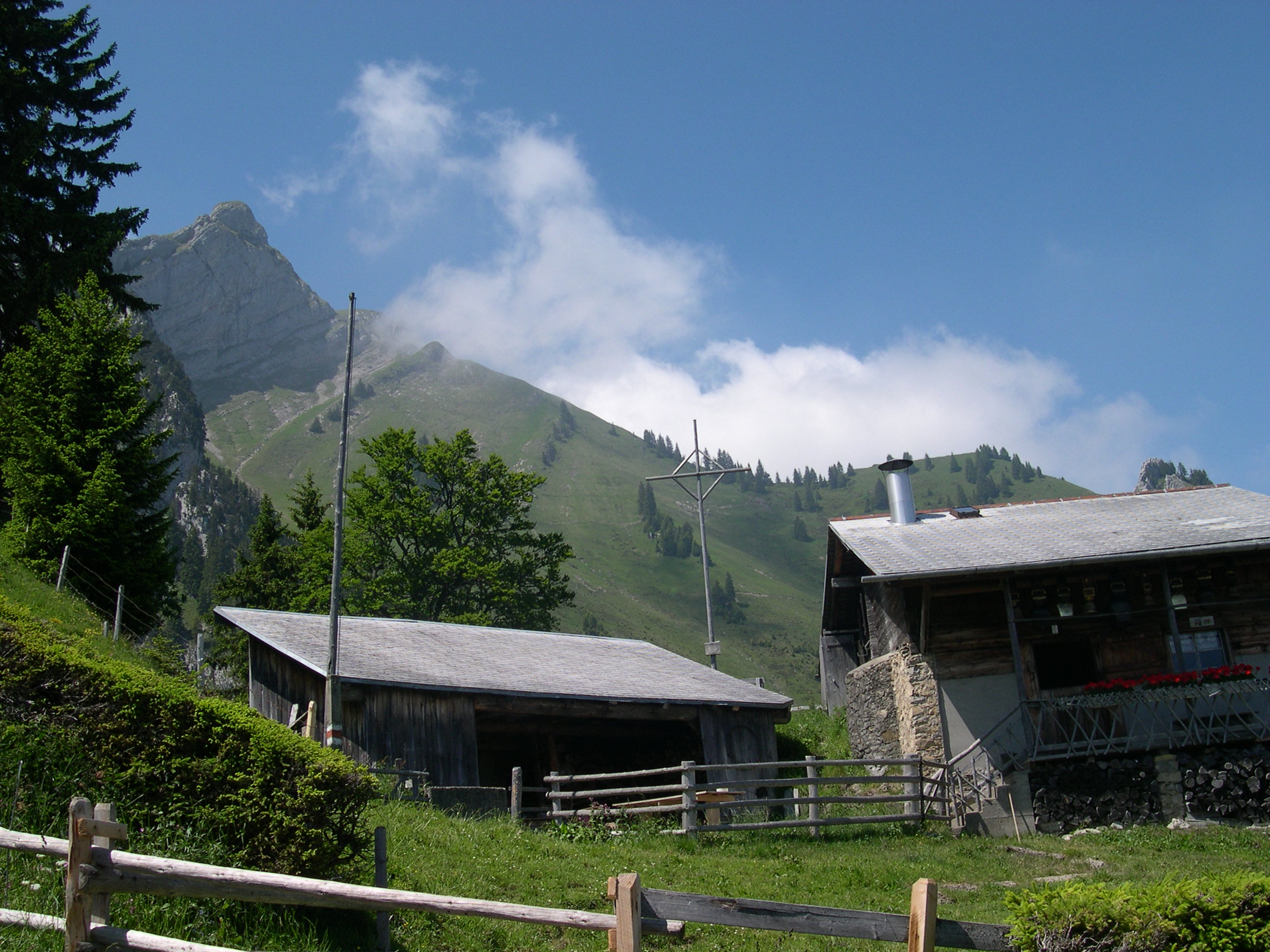
A view from the cog-wheel railway

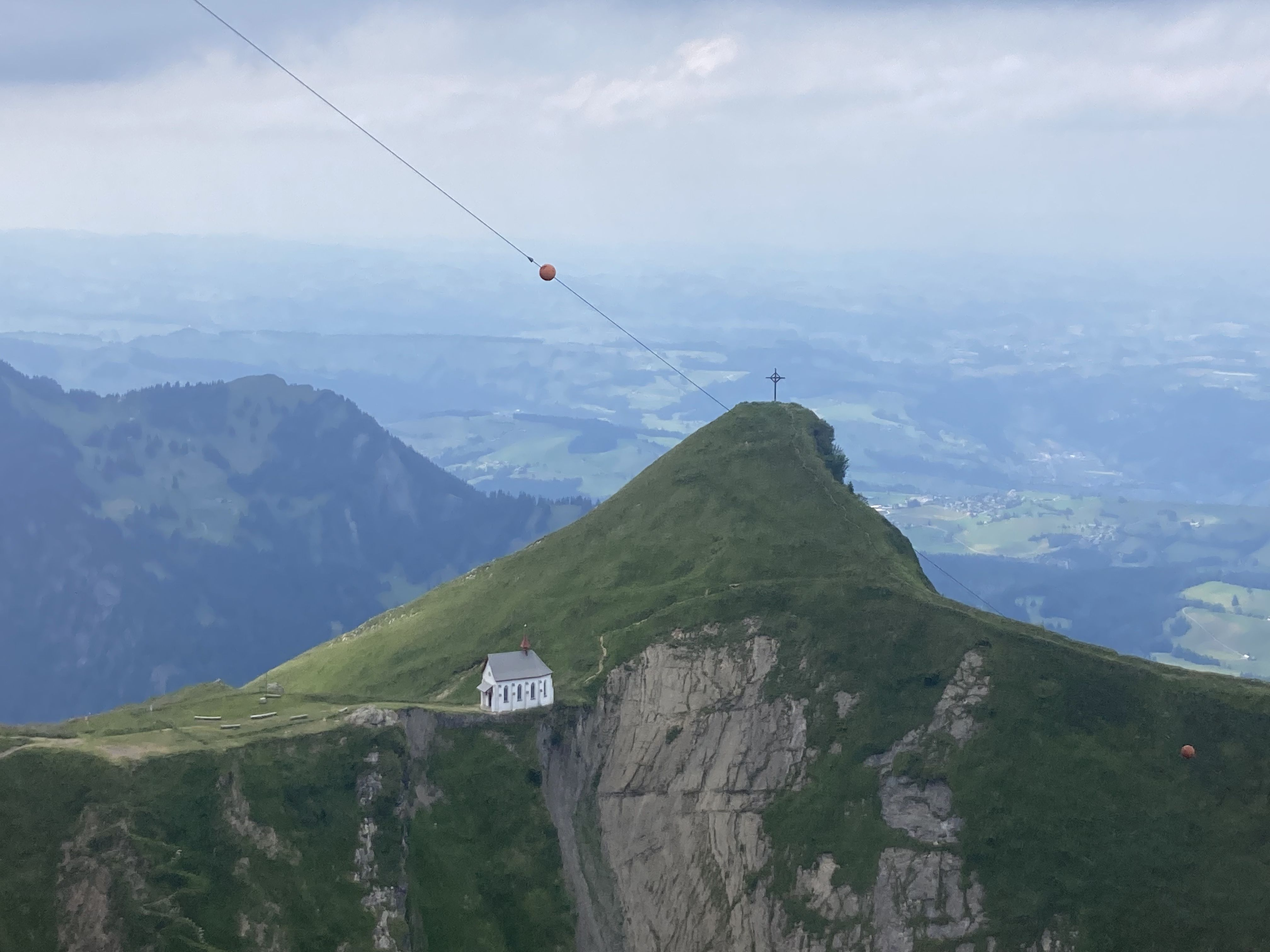
Chapel on Pilatus

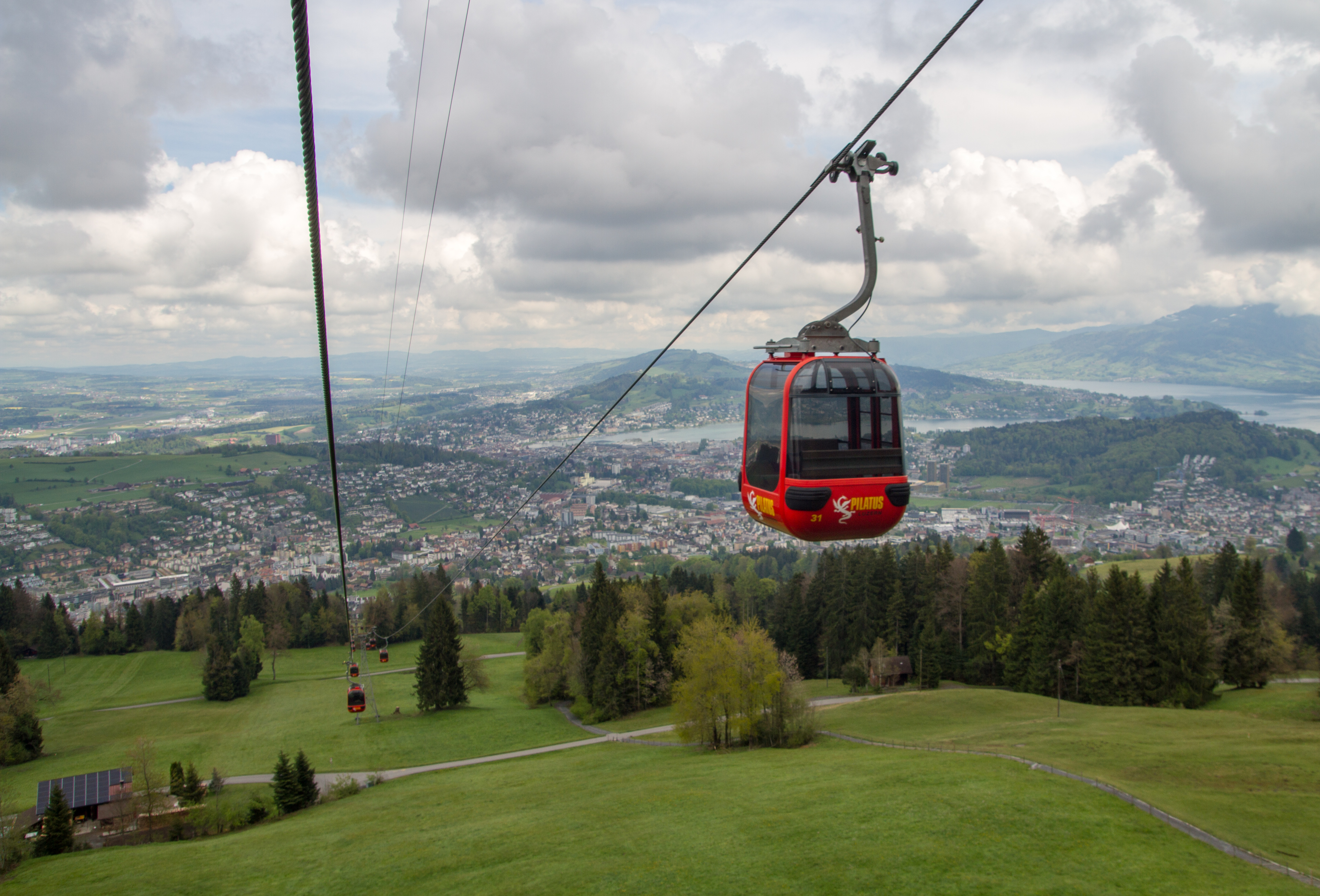
Cableway

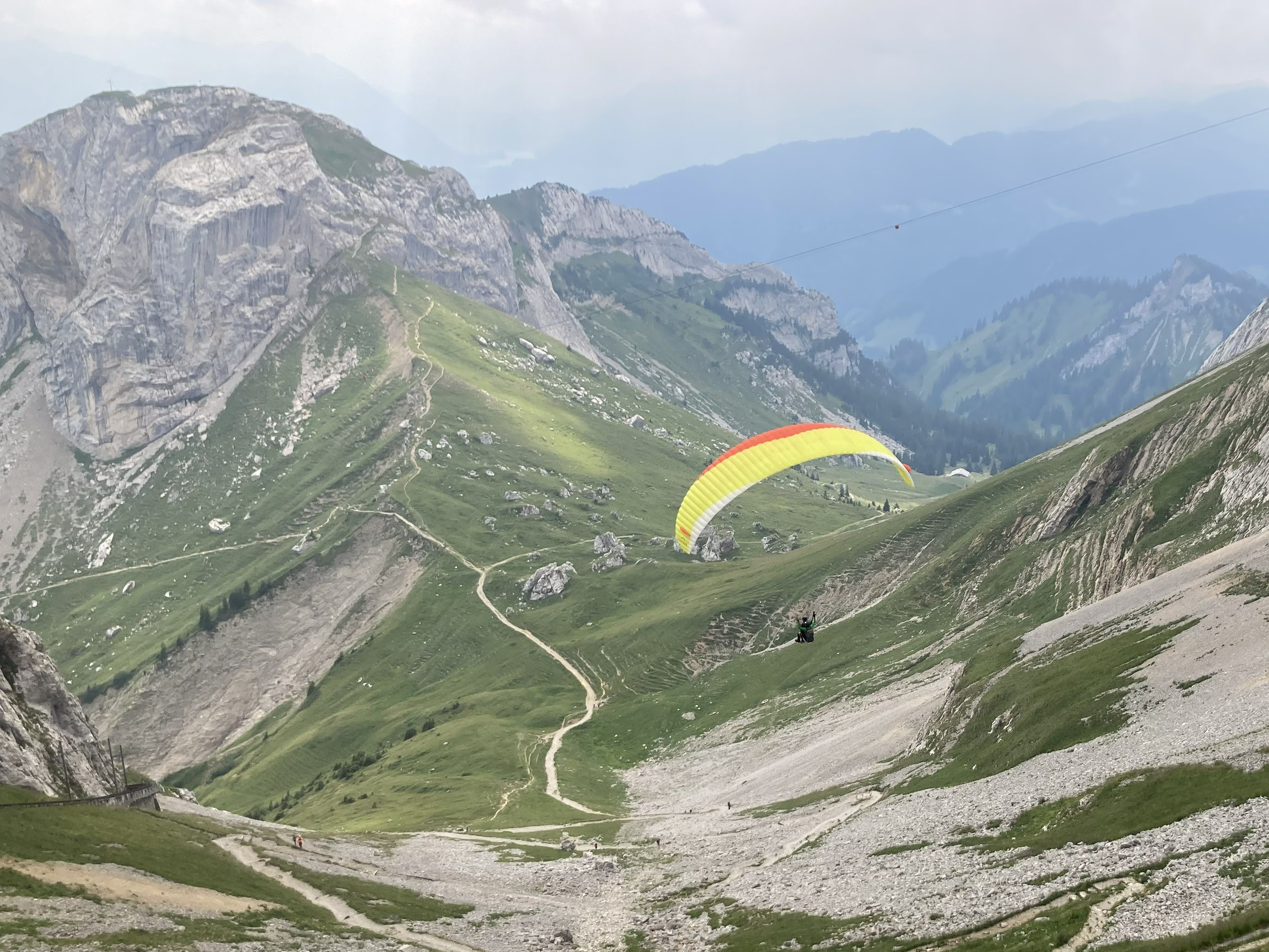
Paraglider taking off from summit

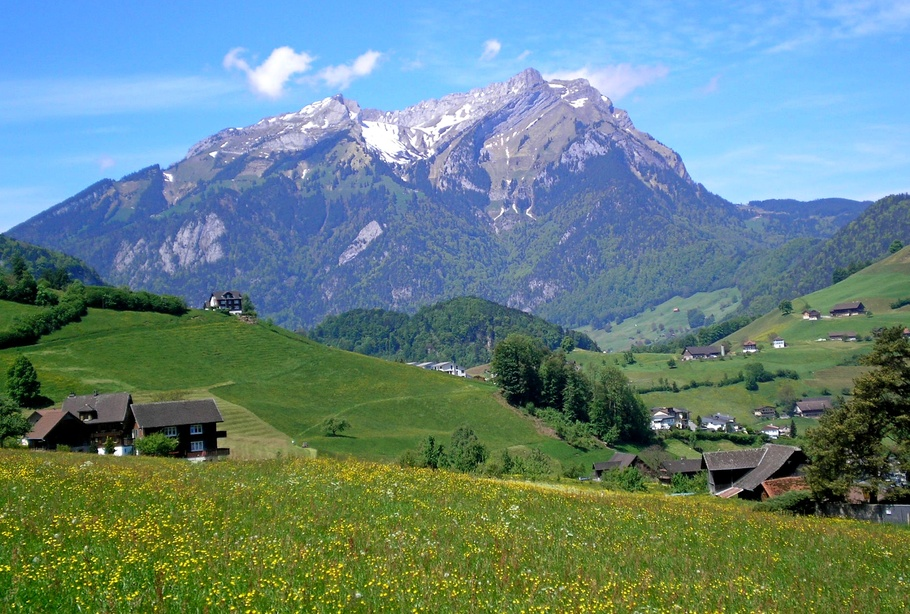
Pilatus seen from Stanserhorn funicular

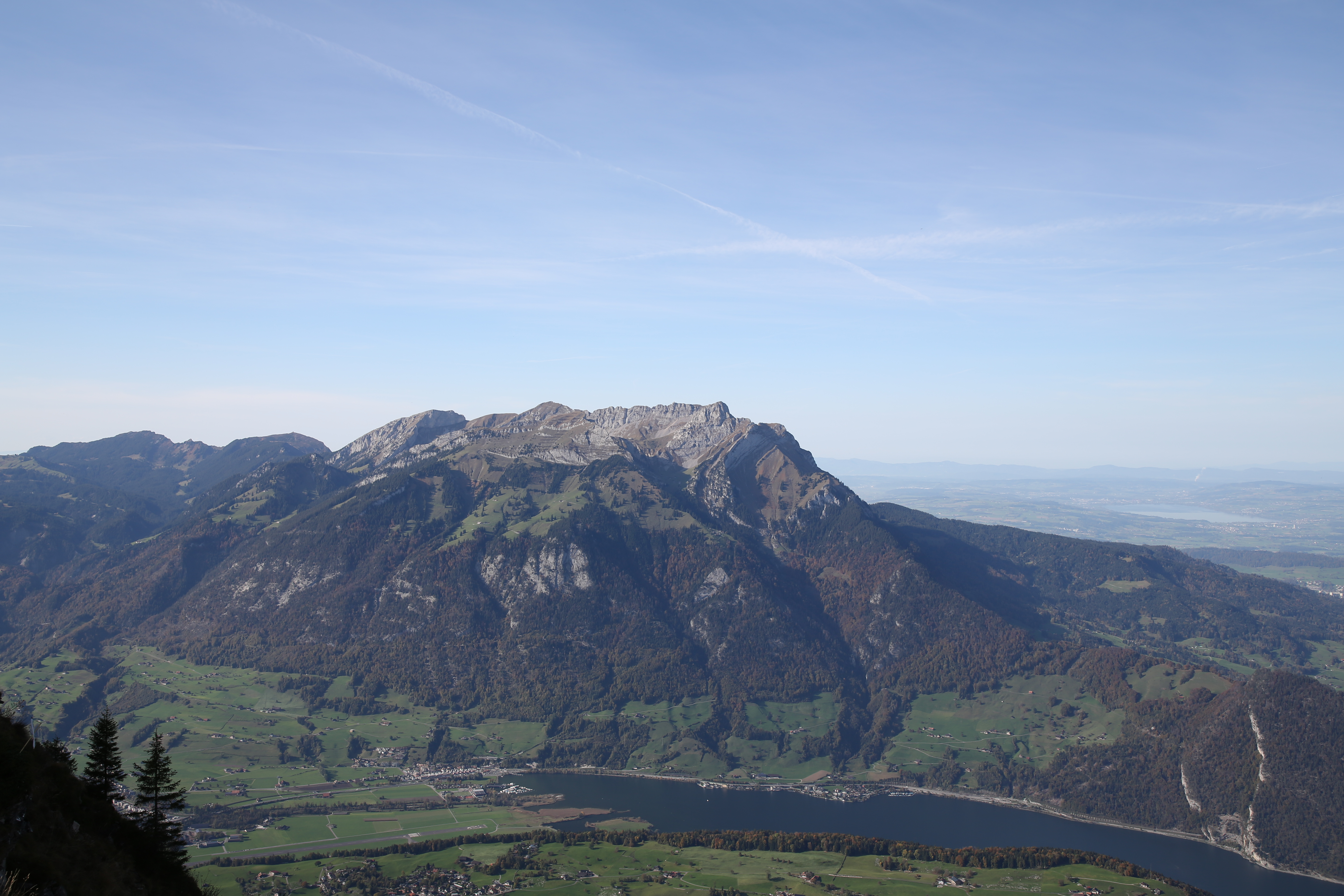
Pilatus with the Alpnachersee below seen from Stanserhorn

== Climate ==
Climate data for Pilatus, elevation 2,105 m (6,906 ft), (1991–2020)
Month	Jan	Feb	Mar	Apr	May	Jun	Jul	Aug	Sep	Oct	Nov	Dec	Year
Mean daily maximum °C (°F)	−0.8 (30.6)	−1.2 (29.8)	0.6 (33.1)	3.2 (37.8)	7.1 (44.8)	10.5 (50.9)	12.6 (54.7)	12.8 (55.0)	9.6 (49.3)	7.3 (45.1)	2.7 (36.9)	0.1 (32.2)	5.4 (41.7)
Daily mean °C (°F)	−3.8 (25.2)	−4.4 (24.1)	−2.5 (27.5)	0.1 (32.2)	4.0 (39.2)	7.5 (45.5)	9.5 (49.1)	9.8 (49.6)	6.5 (43.7)	4.0 (39.2)	−0.3 (31.5)	−2.9 (26.8)	2.3 (36.1)
Mean daily minimum °C (°F)	−6.5 (20.3)	−7.1 (19.2)	−5.2 (22.6)	−2.5 (27.5)	1.3 (34.3)	4.8 (40.6)	6.8 (44.2)	7.2 (45.0)	4.0 (39.2)	1.4 (34.5)	−3.0 (26.6)	−5.6 (21.9)	−0.4 (31.3)
Average precipitation mm (inches)	164.3 (6.47)	154.6 (6.09)	149.8 (5.90)	163.4 (6.43)	152.8 (6.02)	167.9 (6.61)	163.3 (6.43)	161.1 (6.34)	110.5 (4.35)	98.5 (3.88)	131.7 (5.19)	173.0 (6.81)	1,790.9 (70.51)
Average precipitation days (≥ 1.0 mm)	12.2	11.3	13.3	12.8	14.6	15.2	14.4	13.9	11.3	11.0	11.5	13.7	155.2
Average relative humidity (%)	64	66	72	77	82	84	83	81	79	71	68	65	74
Mean monthly sunshine hours	123.5	131.6	154.9	156.0	152.1	146.4	161.8	164.9	153.9	158.9	116.2	106.0	1,726.2
Percentage possible sunshine	51	50	45	41	35	33	36	40	44	52	48	47	42
Source 1: NOAA
Source 2: MeteoSwiss

== In literature ==
In The Chalet School Does It Again. (1955) Elinor Brent-Dyer retells the Pilate burial place legend, the legend is also used in the Simon of Gitta story The Dragons of Mons Fractus by Richard Tierney.

Mount Pilatus plays a pivotal role in the conclusion of Brad Thor's 2002 novel The Lions of Lucerne.

== See also ==
- List of mountains of Nidwalden
- List of mountains of Obwalden
- List of most isolated mountains of Switzerland
- List of mountains of Switzerland accessible by public transport
- List of mountains of Switzerland named after people
- Tourism in Switzerland
