= Rotstöckli =

Mountain in Switzerland

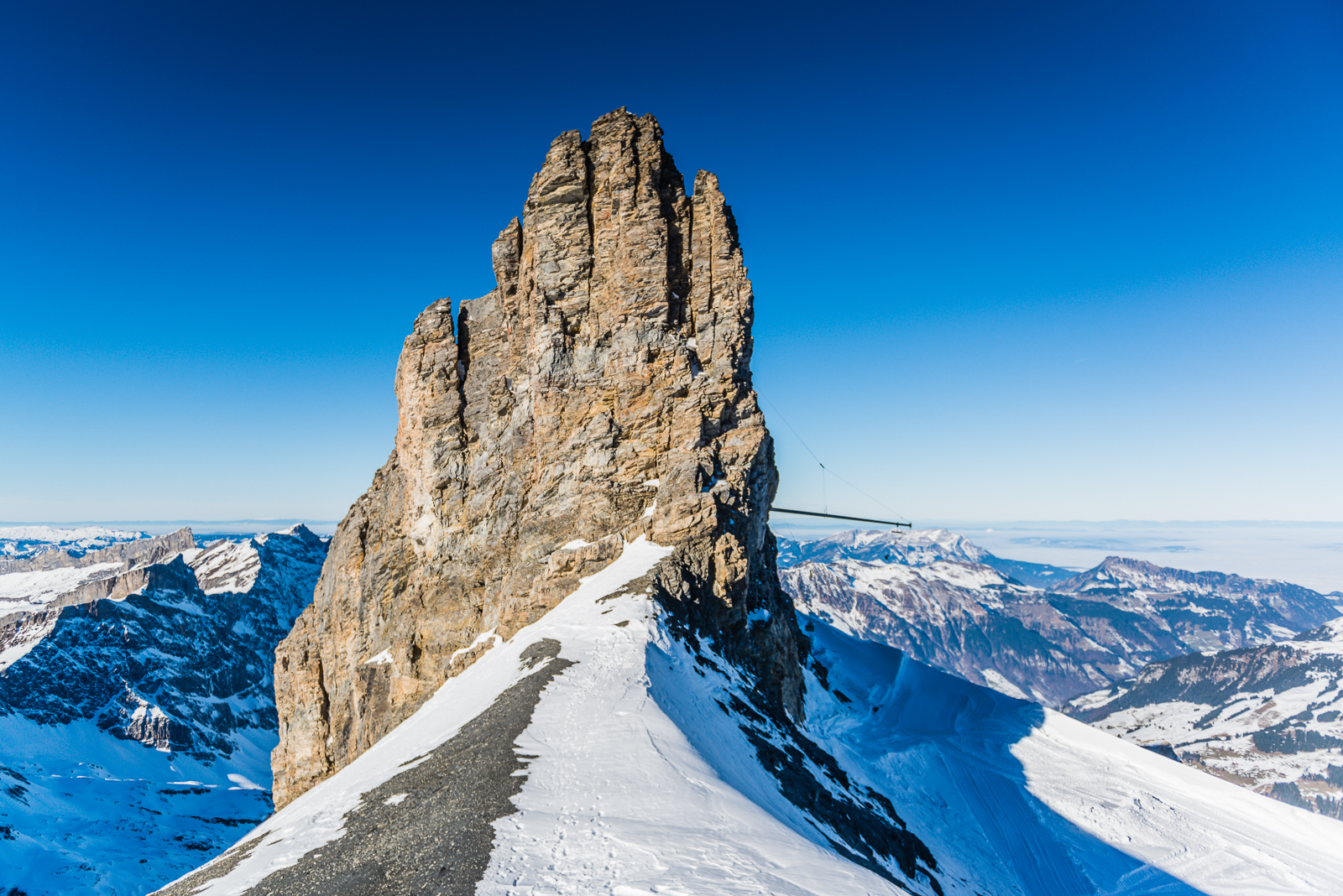
- The Rotstöckli from the Titlis Glacier (south-east side)

Highest point
- Elevation: 2,901 m (9,518 ft)
- Prominence: 46 m (151 ft)
- Parent peak: Titlis
- Isolation: 0.3 km (0.19 mi)
- Listing: Canton high point
- Coordinates: 46°46′39″N 8°25′33″E

Geography
- Location within Switzerland
- Location: Obwalden/Nidwalden, Switzerland
- Parent range: Urner Alps

Geology
- Mountain type: Limestone

The Rotstöckli (2,901 m) is a peak of the Urner Alps below the Titlis, on the border between the Swiss cantons of Obwalden and Nidwalden. It is Nidwalden's highest point. The summit is split between the municipalities of Engelberg (Obwalden) and Wolfenschiessen (Nidwalden).
