= Nünalphorn =

Mountain in Switzerland

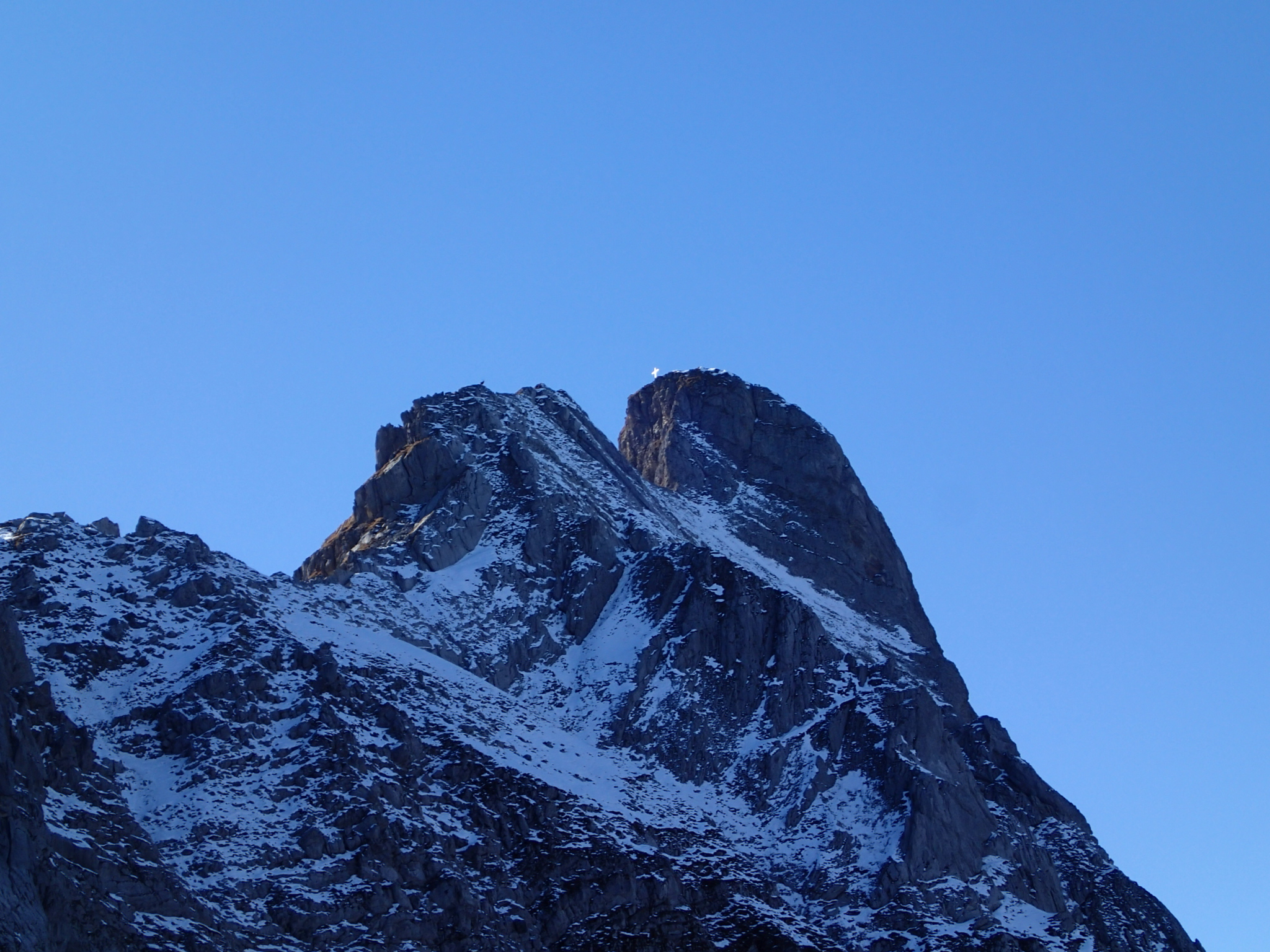

Highest point
- Elevation: 2,385 m (7,825 ft)
- Prominence: 214 m (702 ft)
- Parent peak: Rotsandnollen
- Coordinates: 46°49′26″N 8°19′32″E

Geography
- Location within Switzerland
- Location: Nidwalden/Obwalden, Switzerland
- Parent range: Urner Alps

The Nünalphorn is a mountain of the Urner Alps, located on the border between the Swiss cantons of Nidwalden and Obwalden. It is located between the valleys of Melchtal and Engelberg.
