= Huetstock =

Mountain in Switzerland

- Wild Geissberg
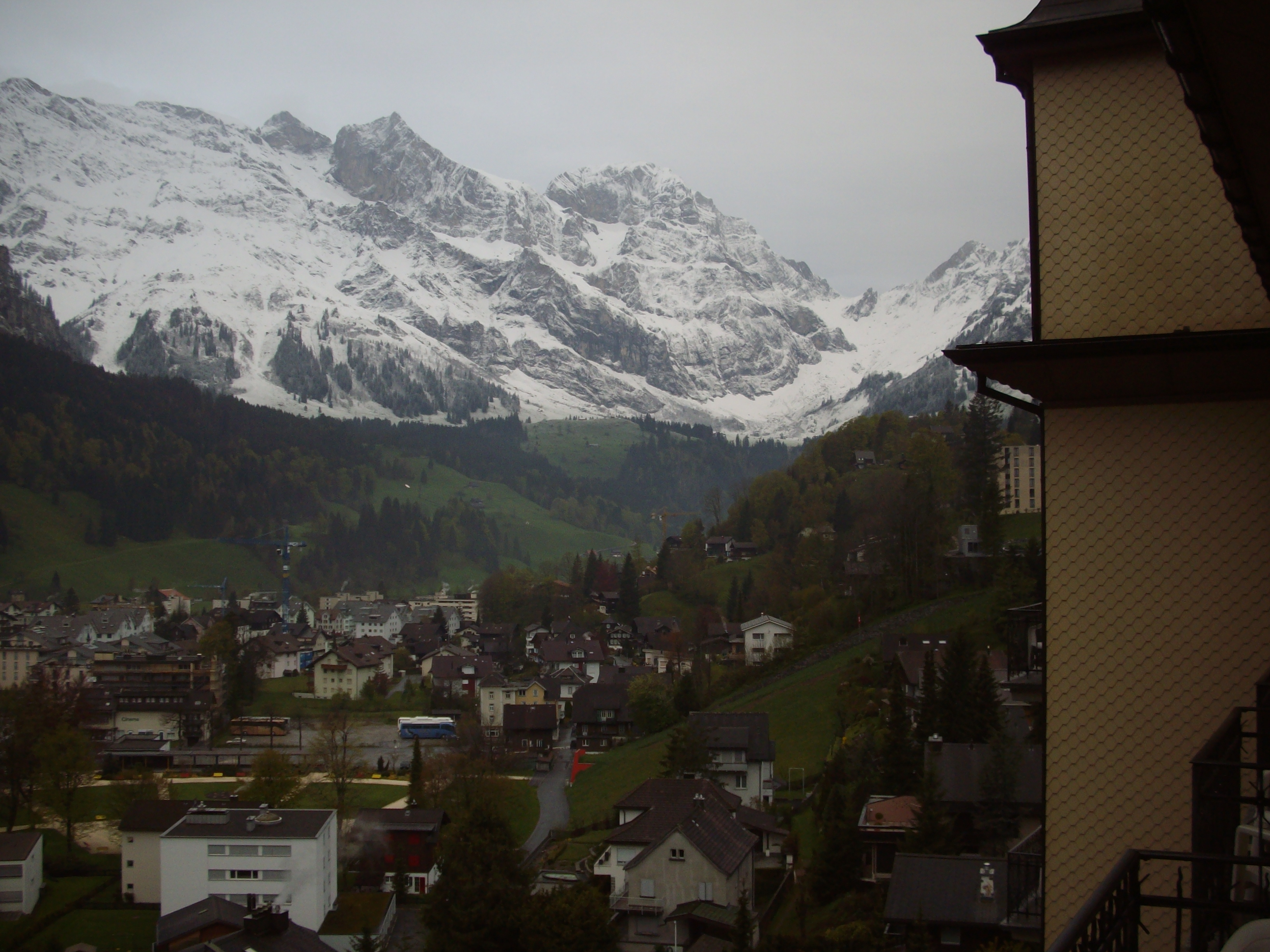
- The Huetstock (centre) from Engelberg (east side)

Highest point
- Elevation: 2,676 m (8,780 ft)
- Prominence: 230 m (750 ft)
- Parent peak: Rotsandnollen
- Coordinates: 46°48′53.2″N 8°19′34.3″E

Geography
- Location within Switzerland
- Location: Nidwalden/Obwalden, Switzerland
- Parent range: Urner Alps

The Huetstock (also known as Wild Geissberg) is a mountain of the Urner Alps, located on the border between Nidwalden and Obwalden in Central Switzerland. It is located between the valleys of Melchtal and Engelberg, just north of the Rotsandnollen.
