= Gross Sättelistock =

Mountain in Switzerland

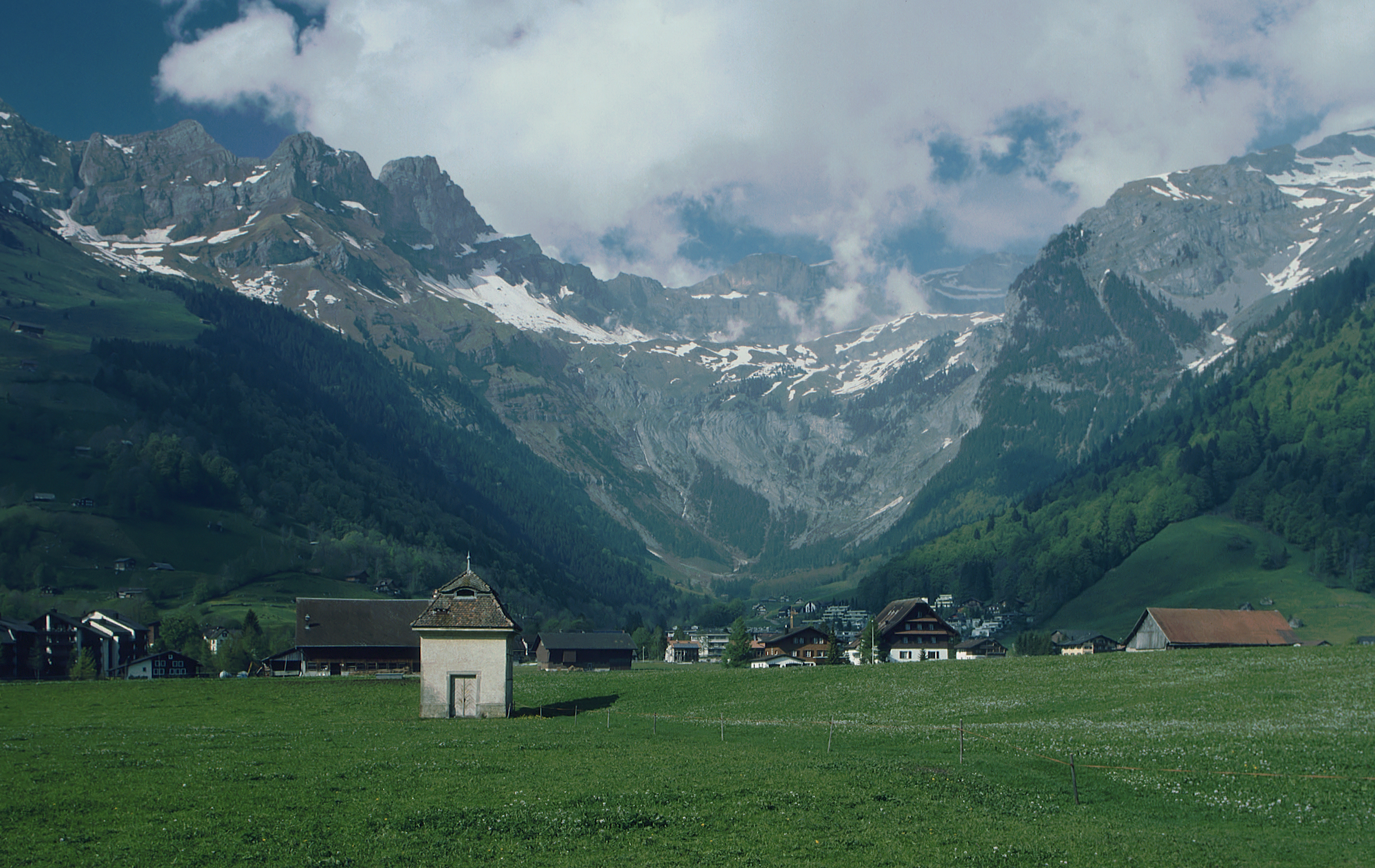
- The Gross Sättelistock (centre left) from Engelberg

Highest point
- Elevation: 2,637 m (8,652 ft)
- Prominence: 272 m (892 ft)
- Parent peak: Brunnistock
- Coordinates: 46°51′09″N 8°26′11″E

Geography
- Location within Switzerland
- Location: Nidwalden/Obwalden, Switzerland
- Parent range: Urner Alps

The Gross Sättelistock is a mountain of the Urner Alps, located on the border between the cantons of Nidwalden and Obwalden in Central Switzerland. It lies north of Engelberg.
