= Rotsandnollen =

Mountain in Switzerland

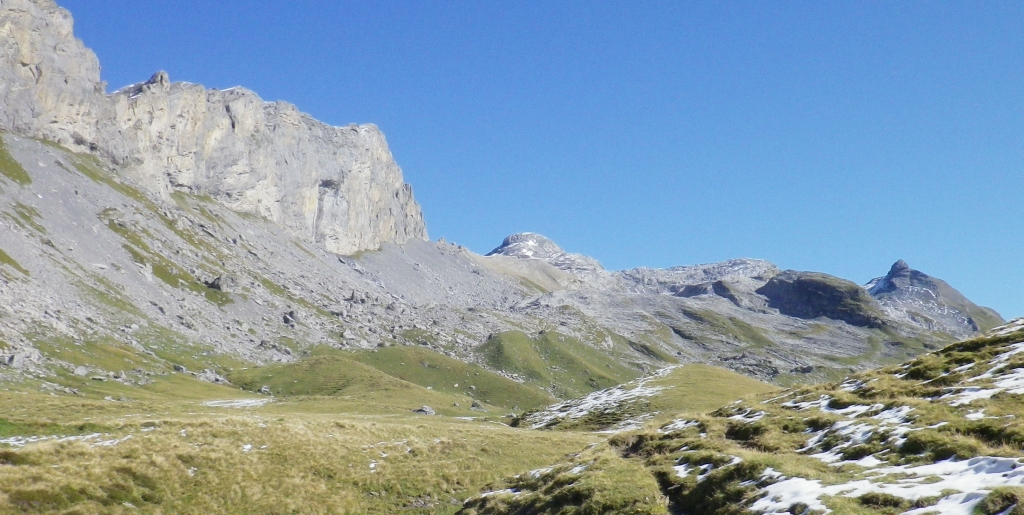
- The Rotsandnollen (left centre)

Highest point
- Elevation: 2,700 m (8,900 ft)
- Prominence: 493 m (1,617 ft)
- Parent peak: Dammastock
- Coordinates: 46°48′2″N 8°20′37″E

Geography
- Location within Switzerland
- Location: Nidwalden/Obwalden, Switzerland
- Parent range: Urner Alps

The Rotsandnollen is a mountain of the Urner Alps, located between Melchsee-Frutt and Engelberg in Central Switzerland. The summit is located on the border between the cantons of Nidwalden and Obwalden.
