= Nature park =

Protected land area

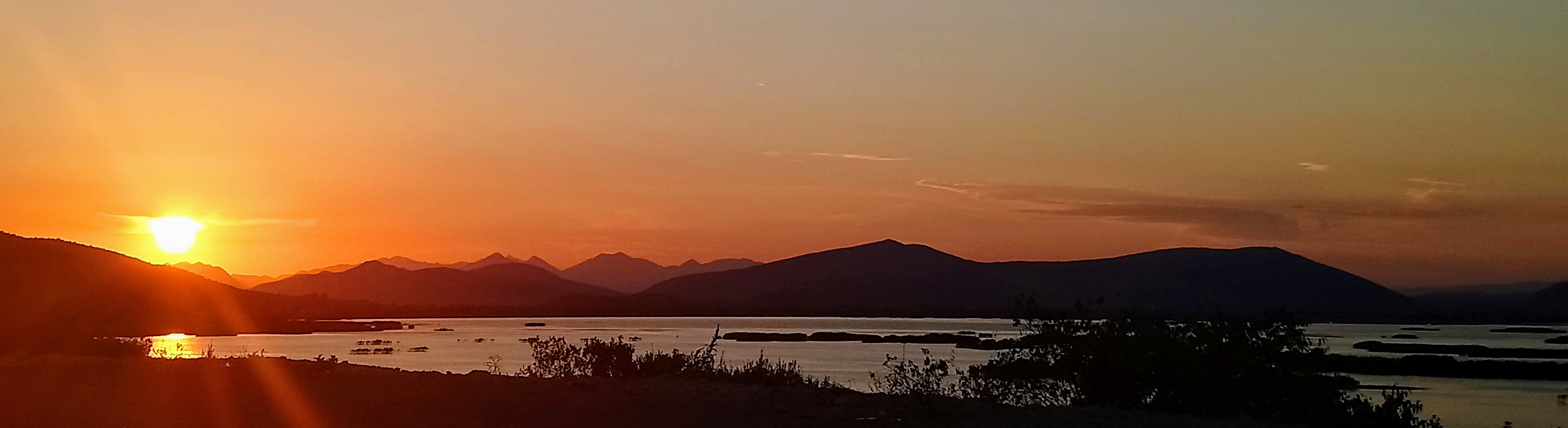
The Hutovo Blato protected marshland and bird reservation in Bosnia and Herzegovina

A nature park, or sometimes natural park, is a designation for a protected area by means of long-term land planning, sustainable resource management and limitation of agricultural and real estate developments. These valuable landscapes are preserved in their present ecological state and promoted for ecotourism purposes.

In most countries nature parks are subject to legally regulated protection, which is part of their conservation laws.

In terms of level of protection, a category "Nature Park" is not the same as a "National Park", which is defined by the IUCN and its World Commission on Protected Areas as a category II protected area. A "Nature Park" designation, depending on local specifics, falls between category III and category VI according to IUCN categorization, in most cases closer to category VI. However some nature parks have later been turned into national parks.

== International nature parks ==
The first international nature park in Europe, the present-day Pieniny National Park was founded jointly by Poland and Slovakia in 1932.

- European Nature Parks: Cross-border plans and projects are carried out under the Europarc umbrella.
- Protected Area Network of Parks (PANPark), certification by the WWF initiated network which are aimed at combining the preservation of wilderness with tourism

== Nature parks by country ==
=== Austria ===
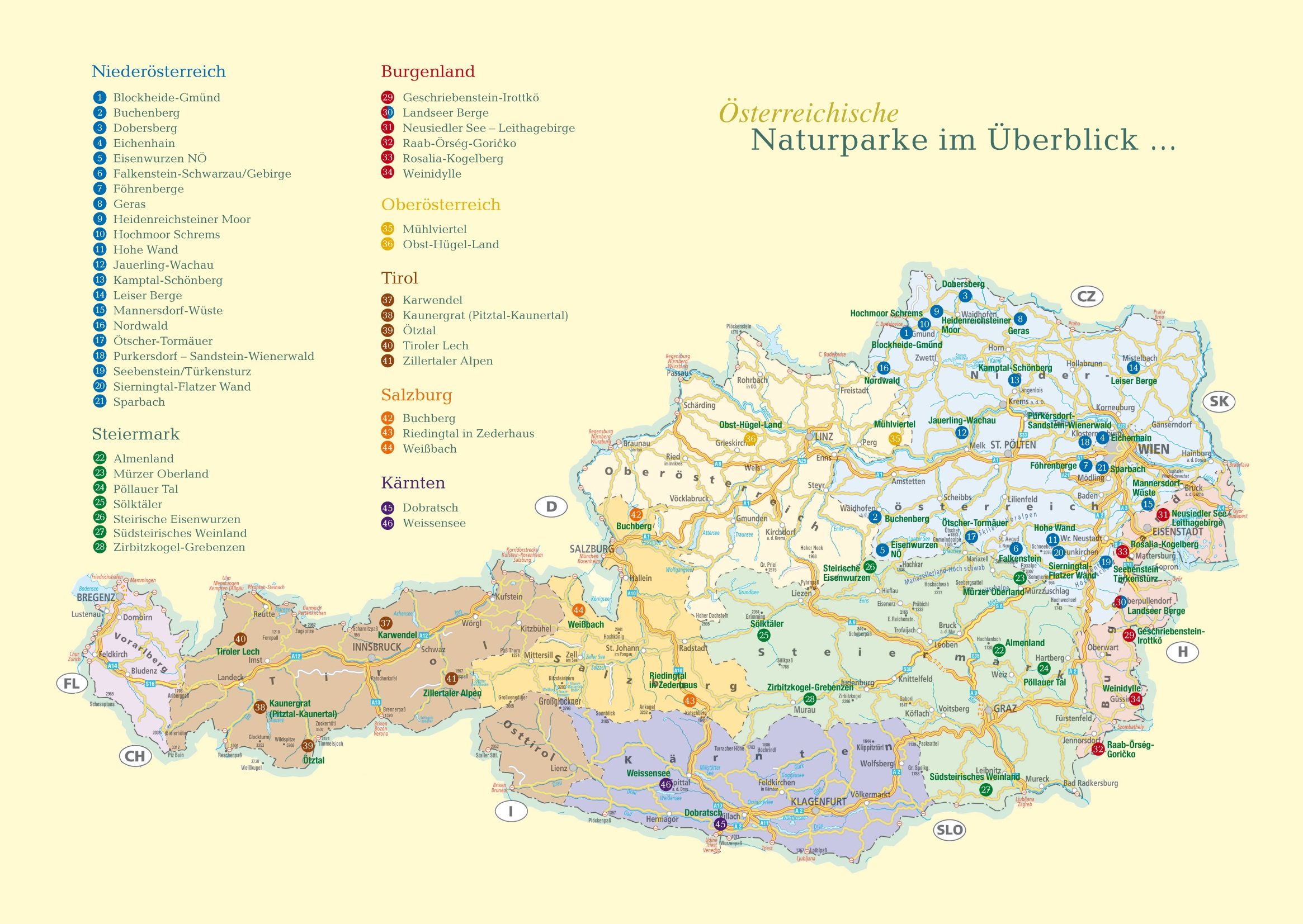
Overview map of Austria's nature parks (image uploaded in 2010)

There are currently 47 nature parks in Austria with a total area of around 500,000 ha (as at April 2010). They are host to nearly 20 million visitors annually. The designation of "nature park" is awarded by the respective state governments. To achieve this award, the 4 pillars of a nature park have to be met: conservation, recreation, education and regional development.

==== Association of Austrian Nature Parks (VNÖ) ====
In 1995 all the Austrian nature parks agreed to be represented by the Association of Austrian Nature Parks (Verband der Naturparke Österreichs) or VNÖ.

Currently there are nature parks in the following states:

- Burgenland:
  - Geschriebenstein-Irottkö
  - Landseer Berge
  - Raab-Örseg-Goricko
  - Weinidylle
  - Neusiedler See-Leithagebirge
  - Rosalia-Kogelberg
- Carinthia
  - Dobratsch
  - Weißensee
- Lower Austria:
  - Blockheide-Eibenstein-Gmünd
  - Buchenberg-Waidhofen an der Ybbs
  - Dobersberg-Thayatal
  - Eichenhain bei Klosterneuburg
  - Eisenwurzen NÖ
  - Falkenstein
  - Föhrenberge-Mödling
  - Geras
  - Heidenreichsteiner Moor
  - Hochmoor Schrems
  - Hohe Wand Nature Park
  - Jauerling-Wachau
  - Kamptal-Schönberg
  - Leiser Berge
  - Mannersdorf-Wüste
  - Nordwald-Bad Großpertholz

- Ötscher-Tormäuer
- Purkersdorf-Sandstein-Wienerwald
- Seebenstein-Türkensturz
- Sierningtal-Flatzer Wand
- Sparbach (ältester Naturpark, seit 1962)
- Upper Austria:
  - Mühlviertel
  - Obst-Hügel-Land
- Salzburg
  - Buchberg
  - Riedingtal in Zederhaus
  - Weißbach bei Lofer
- Styria:
  - Almenland
  - Mürzer Oberland
  - Sölktäler
  - Steirische Eisenwurzen
  - Pöllauer Tal
  - Südsteirisches Weinland
  - Zirbitzkogel-Grebenzen
- Tyrol
  - Alpenpark Karwendel
  - Kaunergrat (Pitztal-Kaunertal)
  - Tyrolean Lechtal
  - Zillertal Alps
  - Ötztal
- Vorarlberg
  - Biosphere park Großes Walsertal
  - Nagelfluhkette
  - Rhine delta (Lake Constance)

=== Belgium ===
In Belgium, there are two different structures. In Flanders, their name is Regionale Landschappen and in Wallonia, the Natural Parks. There are 17 Regionale Landschappen in Flanders and 9 Natural Parks in Wallonia.

- Fédération des Parcs naturels de Wallonie
- Regionale Landschappen

=== Croatia ===
In Croatia there is a total of eight national parks and twelve nature parks. Under nature park protection are the following regions:

- Biokovo
- Kopački rit
- Lonjsko polje
- Medvednica
- Papuk
- Telašćica
- Učka
- Velebit
- Vransko jezero
- Žumberak-Samoborsko gorje
- Lastovo
- Dinara

=== Czech Republic ===
In the Czech Republic a Nature Park (Přírodní Park) is defined as a large area serving the protection of a landscape against activities that could decrease its natural and esthetic value. They can be established by any State Environment Protection body.

=== Germany ===
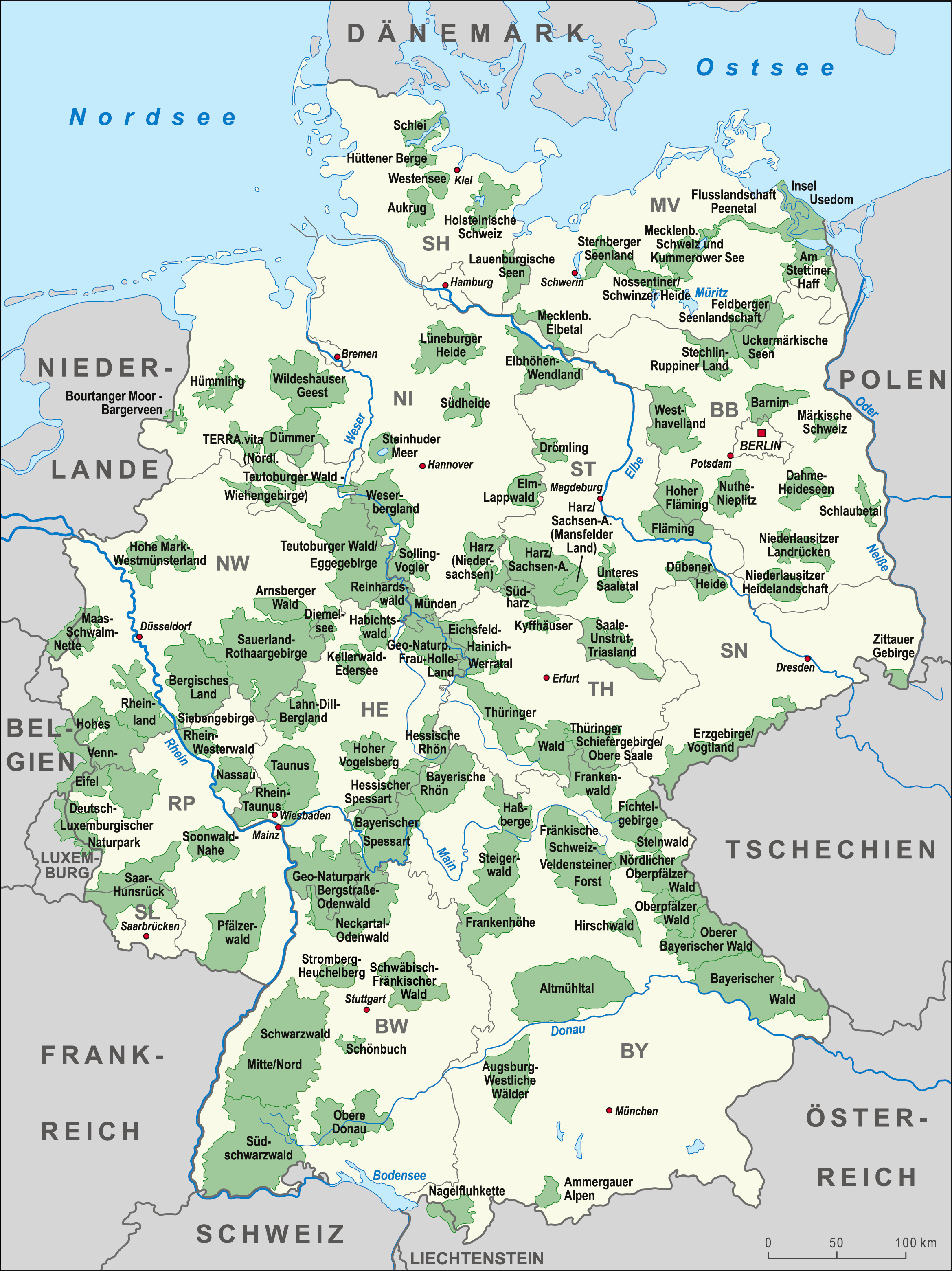
Nature parks in Germany (image created 2010)

The Nature park is one of the options for area-based nature conservation provided for under the Federal Nature Conservation Act (the BNatSchG). On 6 June 1956 in the former capital city of Bonn at the annual meeting of the Nature Reserve Association (in the presence of President Theodor Heuss and Minister Heinrich Lübke)., the environmentalist and entrepreneur, Alfred Toepfer, presented a programme developed jointly with the Central Office for Nature Conservation and Landscape Management and other institutions to set up (initially) 25 nature parks in West Germany. Five percent of the area of the old Federal Republic of Germany was to be spared from major environmental damage as a result.

==== Definition of nature parks in Germany ====
The definition of the category of nature park is laid down in federal law (§ 27 of the BNatSchG). Details, especially with regard to the identification, investigation or recognition as a nature park vary in each state depending on the provisions of local conservation law.

§ 27 of the BnatSchG determines that natural parks are large areas that are to be developed and managed as a single unit, that consist mainly of protected landscapes or nature reserves, that have a large variety of species and habitats and that have a landscape that exhibits a variety of uses.

In nature parks, the aim is to strive for environmentally sustainable land use and they should be especially suitable for recreation and for sustainable tourism because of their topographical features.

The underlying idea is a "protection through usage", so the acceptance and participation of the population in the protection of the cultural landscape and nature is very important. In doing so the nature conservation and the needs of recreation users should be linked so that both sides benefit: sustainable tourism with respect for the value of nature and landscape is paramount.

Basically all actions, interventions and projects that would be contrary to the purpose of conservation are prohibited.

Nature parks are to be considered in zoning and must be represented and considered in local development plans. This is called an acquisition memorandum. They are binding and cannot be waived because of a higher common good.

The sponsors of nature parks are usually clubs or local special purpose associations.

The German nature parks come together in the Association of German Nature Parks.

In Germany today there are 101 nature parks (as at: March 2009), that occupy some 25% of the land area. They are an important building block for nature conservation and help to preserve the sites of natural beauty, cultural landscapes, rare species and biotopes and to make them accessible to later generations.

=== Hungary ===
- Geschriebenstein-Írottkő (cross-border park with Burgenland in Austria)
- Raab-Örseg-Goricko (cross-border park with Burgenland in Austria and Goričko in Slovenia)

=== Italy ===
South Tyrol has 8 nature parks and part of a national park

- Schlern-Rosengarten
- Texelgruppe
- Puez-Geisler
- Fanes-Sennes-Prags
- Trudner Horn
- Sexten Dolomites
- Rieserferner-Ahrn
- Sarntal Alps
- Stelvio

=== Philippines ===
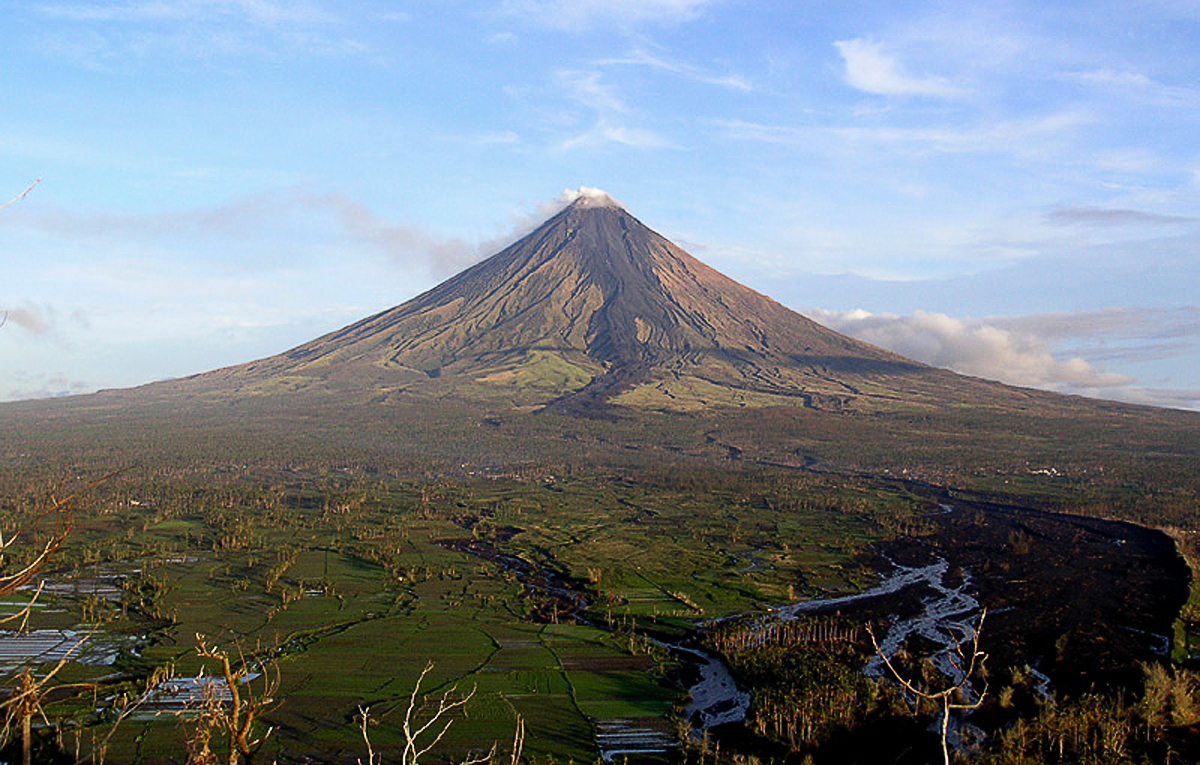
The Mayon Volcano Natural Park

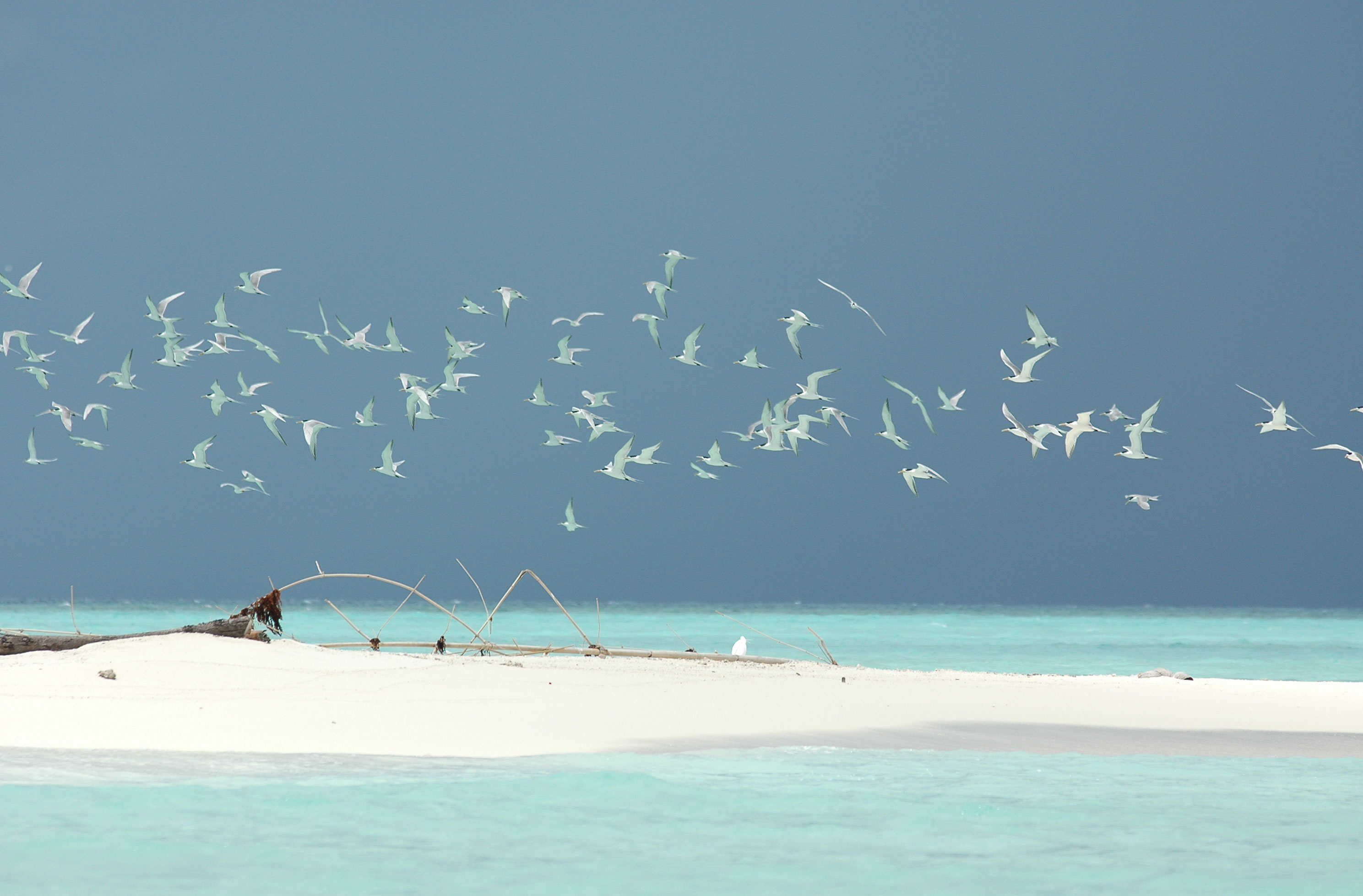
Tubbataha Reef

In the Philippines, Natural Parks are a type of protected area. They are defined by Republic Act No. 7586 as: "relatively large areas not materially altered by human activity where extractive resource uses are not allowed and maintained to protect outstanding natural and scenic areas of national or international significance for scientific, educational and recreational use".

They include:

- Apo Reef
- Balinsasayao Twin Lakes Natural Park
- Bicol Natural Park
- Bongsanglay Natural Park
- Bulusan Volcano Natural Park
- Kalbario-Patapat Natural Park
- Lake Danao (Leyte)
- Mahagnao Volcano
- Mayon Volcano Natural Park
- Mount Apo
- Mount Balatukan
- Mount Guiting-Guiting
- Mount Inayawan Range Natural Park
- Mount Isarog
- Kalatungan Mountain Range
- Kanlaon
- Kitanglad Mountain Range
- Mount Malindang
- Northern Negros Natural Park
- Northern Sierra Madre Natural Park
- Northwest Panay Peninsula Natural Park
- Pasonanca Natural Park
- Samar Island Natural Park
- Sibalom Natural Park
- Tubbataha Reef (also a World Heritage Site)

=== Switzerland ===
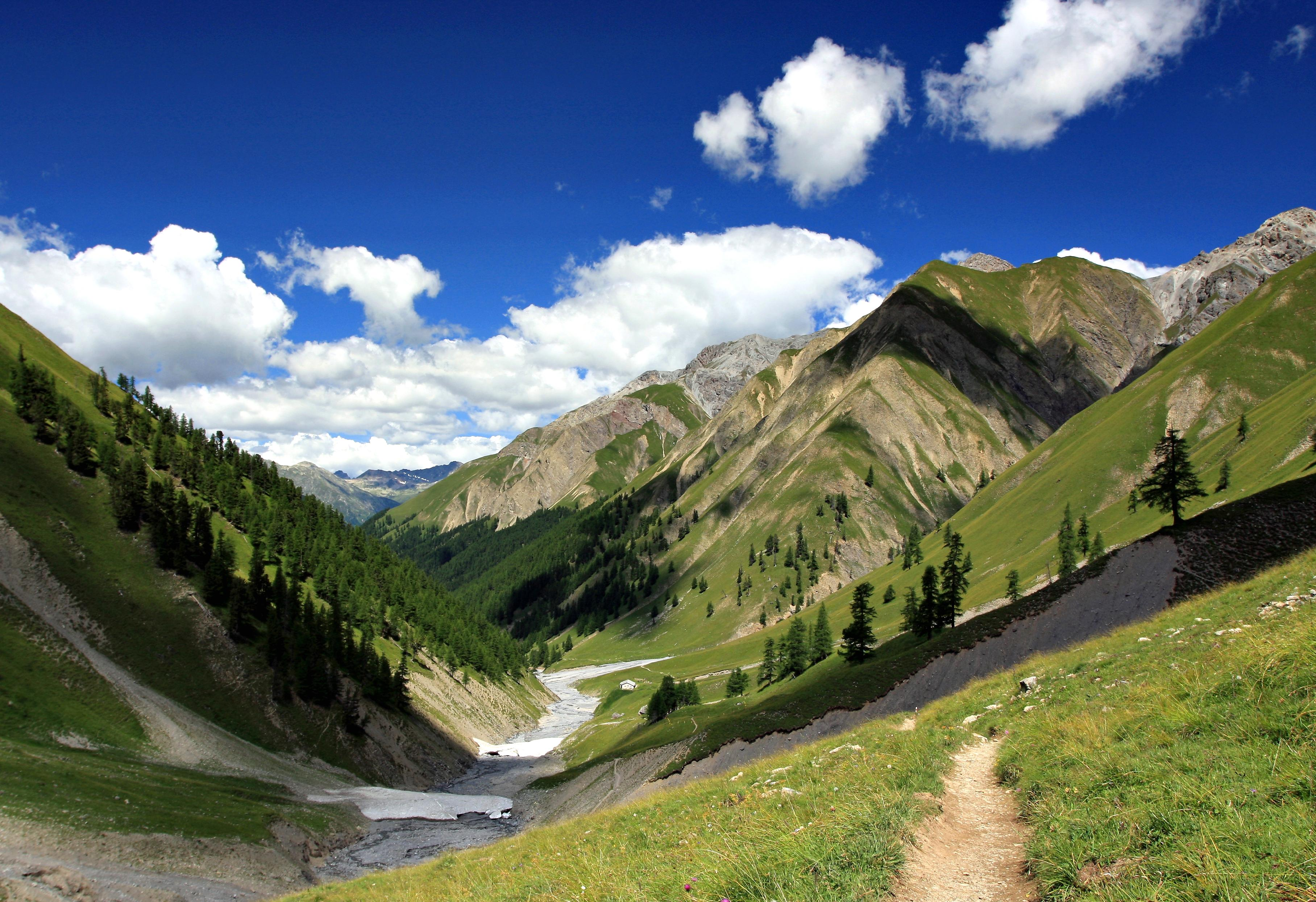
A view in the Swiss National Park.

In Switzerland the establishment of regional nature parks is regulated by the Federal Act on the Protection of Nature and Cultural Heritage. The three categories are:

- National parks (the Swiss National Park)
- Regional nature parks (sixteen parks)
  - Aargau Jura Park
  - Parc Ela
  - Thal Nature Park
  - Entlebuch Biosphere
  - Val Müstair Biosphere
  - Etc.
- Nature experience parks (the Wildnispark Zurich Sihlwald)

National parks and nature experience parks have very strict protected areas, something which does not exist in regional nature parks. The latter focus much more on striking a balance in the level of support between nature conservation and the regional economy.

=== Spain ===
In Spain, a natural park (Spanish: parque natural) is a natural space protected for its biology, geology, or landscape, with ecological, aesthetic, educational, or scientific value whose preservation merits preferential attention on the part of public administration. The regulation of the activities that may occur there attempts to assure its protection. Natural parks focus their attention on the conservation and maintenance of flora, fauna, and terrain. Natural parks may be maritime or terrestrial and can be in the mountains, along the coasts, in the desert, or any other geographically defined space.

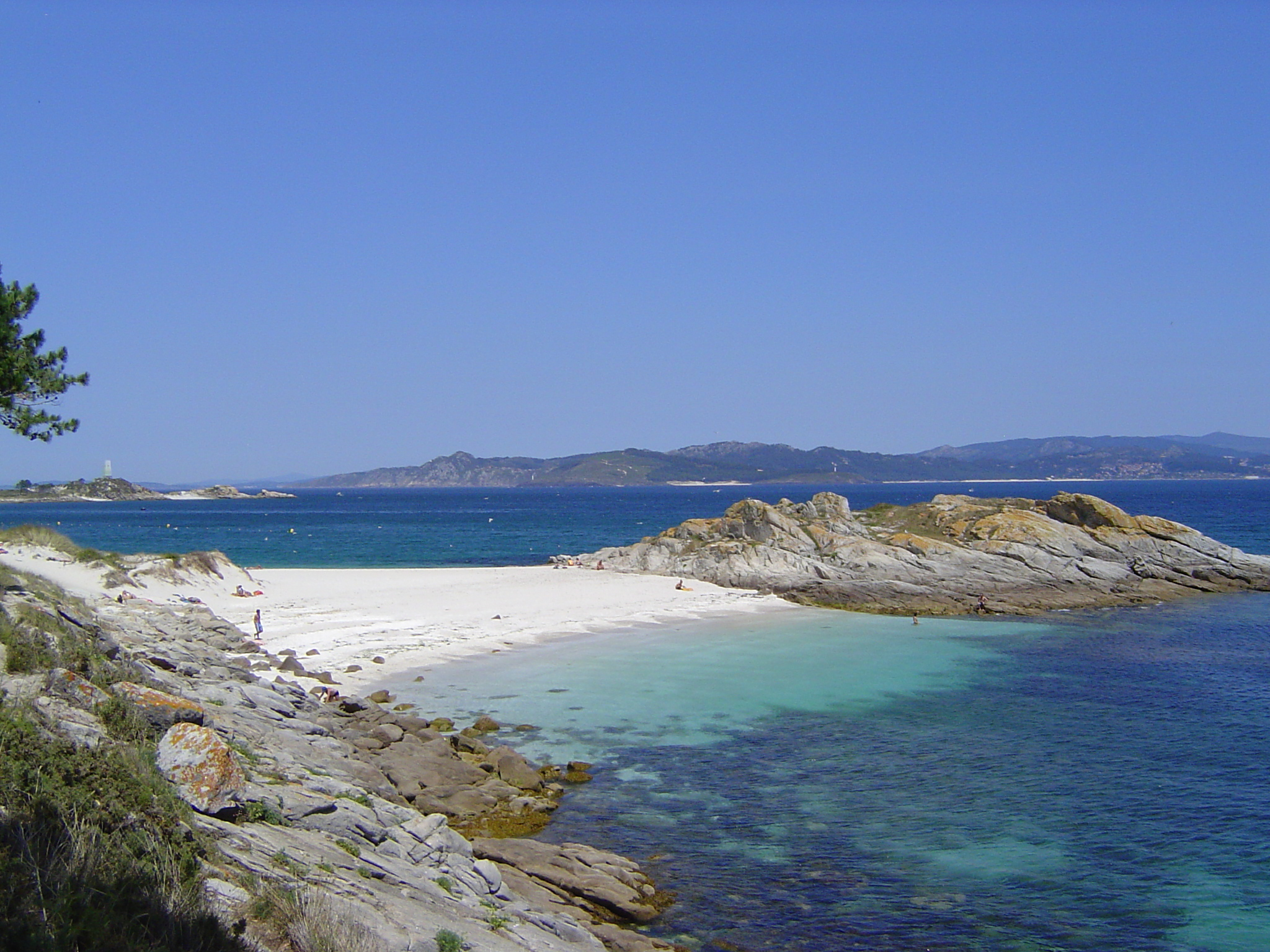
Islas Cíes in Pontevedra.

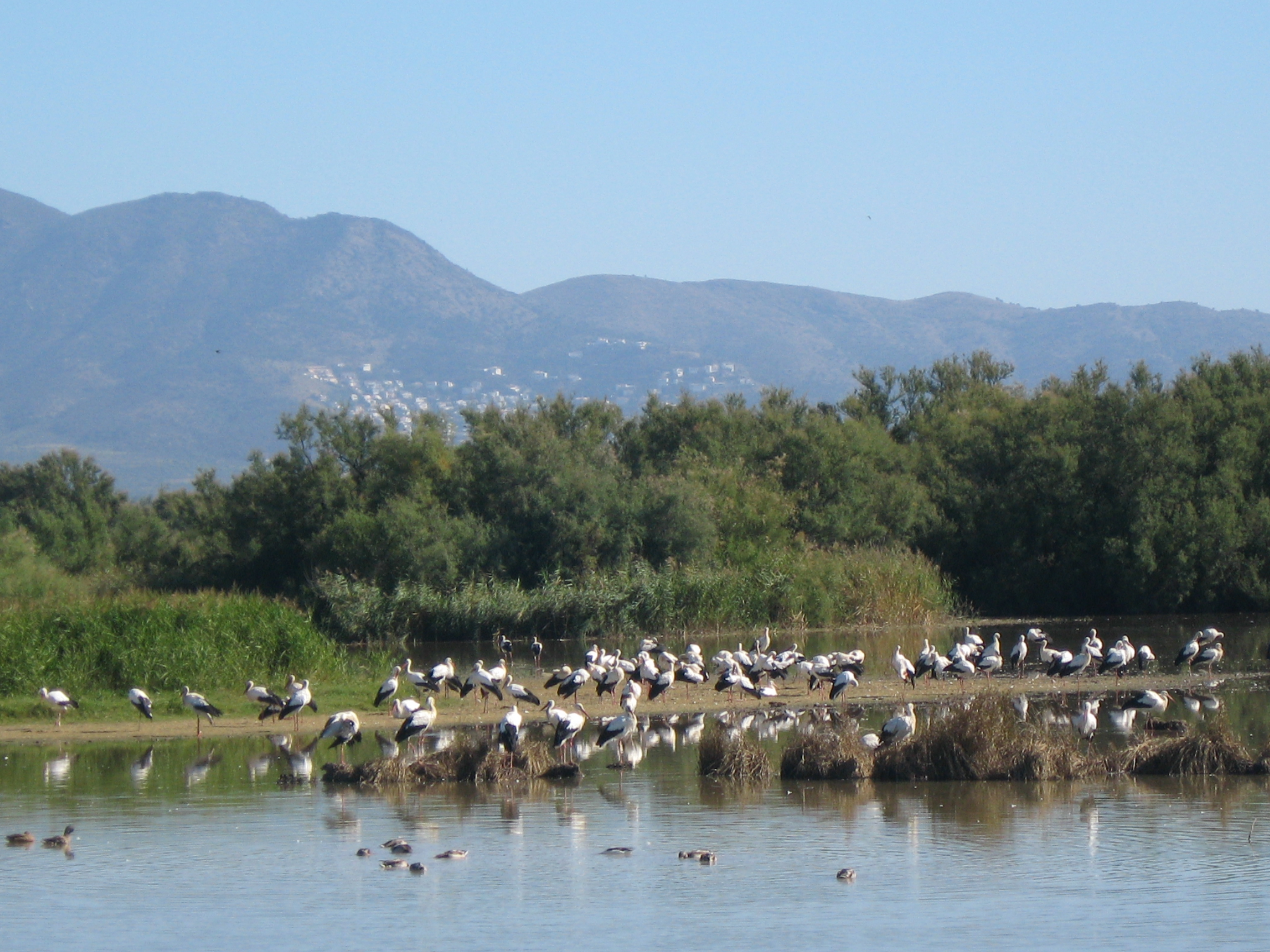
Storks in Aiguamolls de l'Empordà.

Spain distinguishes natural parks from national parks. The categories of protected areas in Spain under Law 4/1989 are not based on higher or lower levels of protection, but on functions and characteristics:

- Parks: "natural areas, little transformed by human exploitation and occupation, that, for reason of the beauty of their landscapes, the representativeness of their ecosystems or their flora, fauna or geomorphological formations, possesses ecological, aesthetic, educational and scientific value, whose conservation merits preferential attention".
  - National parks: "those spaces that, being able to be declared as Parks by Law of the General Courts, are declared their conservation of general interest of the Nation with the attribution to the State of its management and the corresponding allocation of budgetary resources".
- Nature reserves: "natural spaces whose creation has as its end the protection of ecosystems, communities or biological elements that, because of their rarity, fragility, importance or singularity merit a special valuation".
- Natural monuments: "natural spaces or elements constituted basically by formations of notably singularity, rarity or beauty, that merit being the object of special protection".
- Protected Landscapes: "concrete places in the natural environment that, because of their aesthetic and cultural valuer, merit special protection".

The largest protected space in Spain, and also its largest natural park, is the Sierras de Cazorla, Segura y Las Villas Natural Park in the province of Jaén, at the headwaters of the Guadalquivir. 9.1 percent of the surface area of Spain is protected, including 42 percent of the Canary Islands, 30.5 percent of Andalusia, and 21.51 percent of Catalonia, with lesser percentages in the other autonomous communities. Andalusia, being far larger than the Canary Islands or Catalonia, has 36 percent of the total protected areas in the country.

== See also ==
- Animal sanctuary
- Zoo
