= Nature parks in Switzerland =

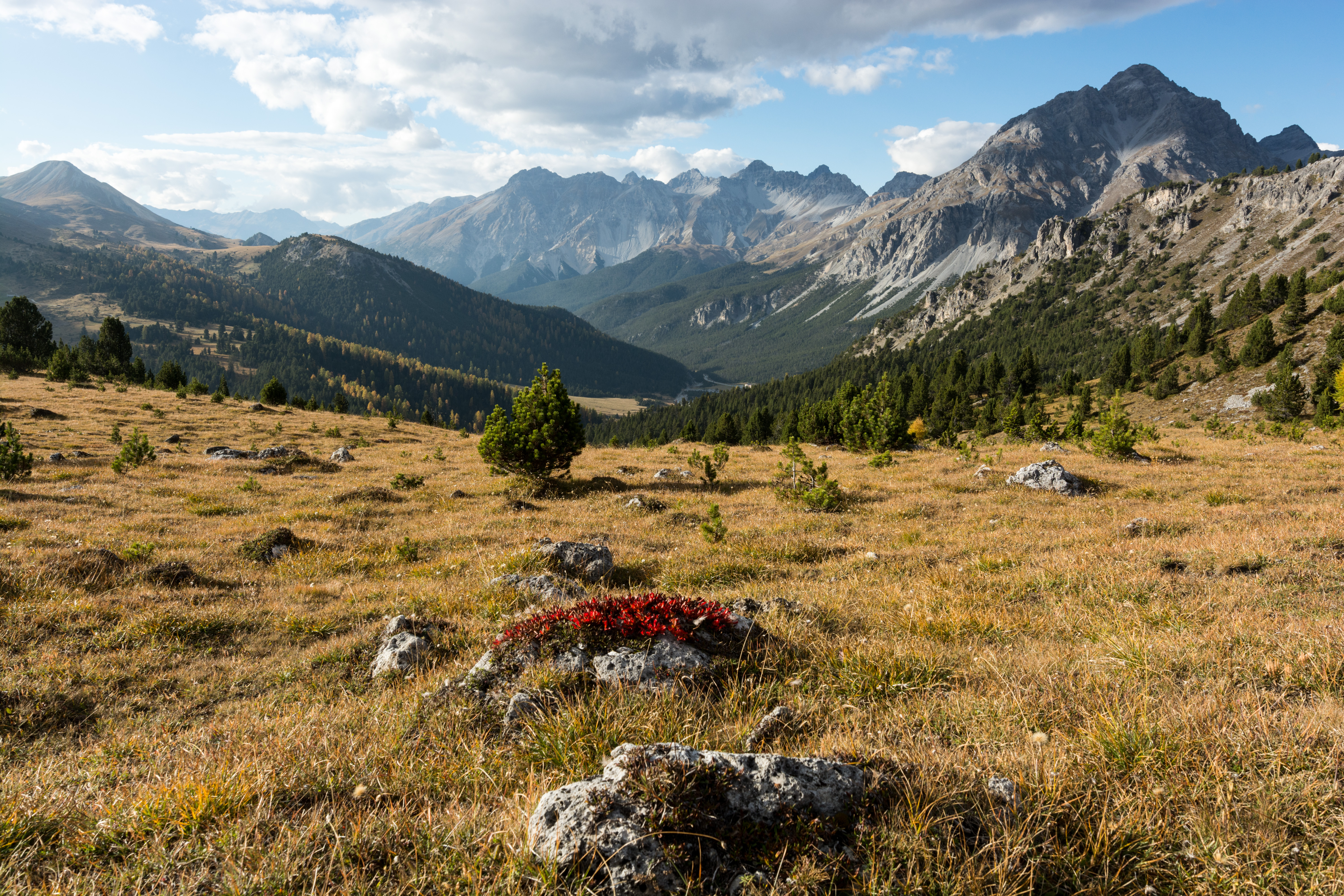
A view in the Swiss National Park.

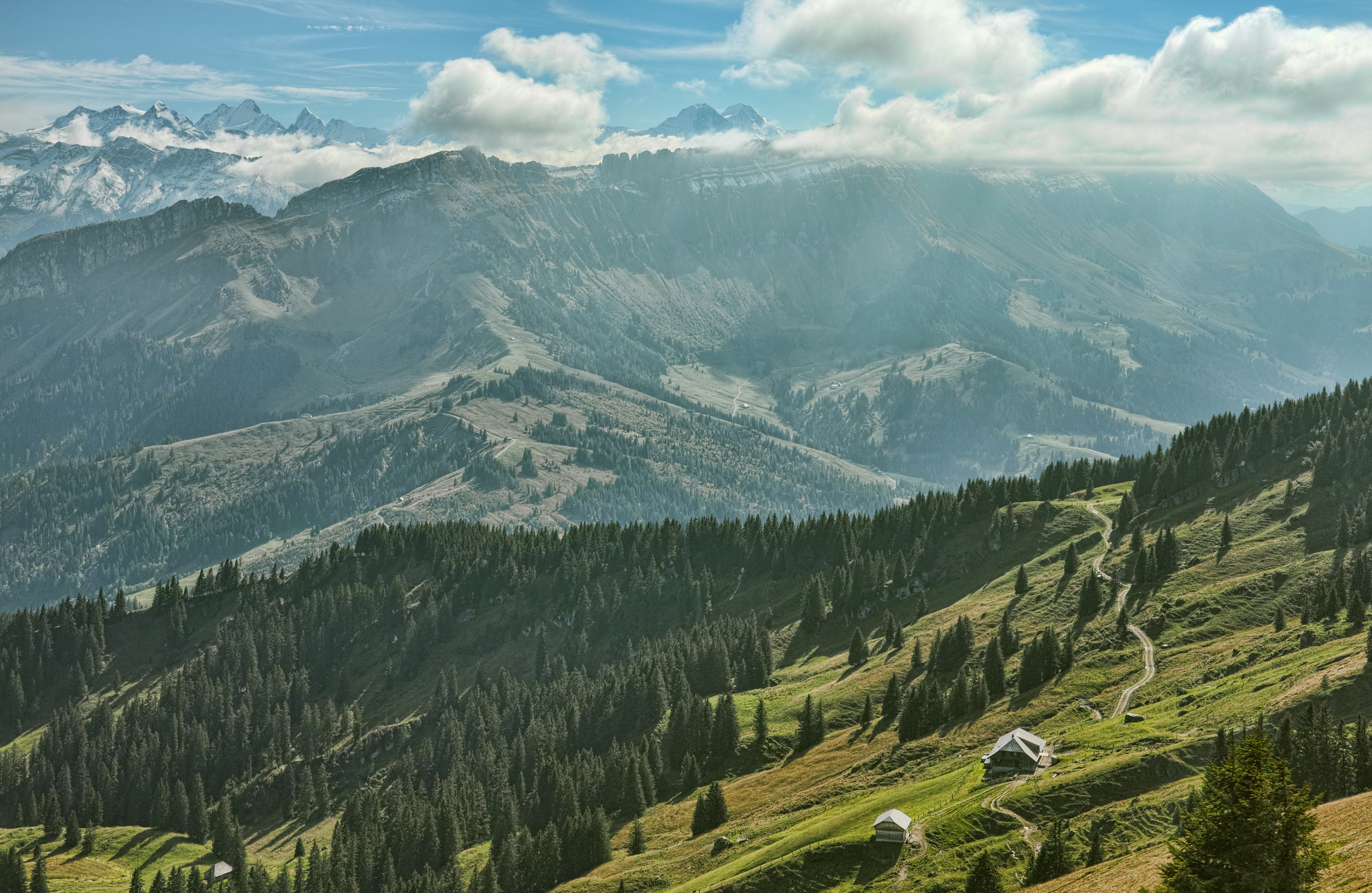
In the UNESCO Entlebuch Biosphere reserve.

Switzerland has eighteen official natural parks (and three candidate parks) classified in three categories (national parks, regional nature parks and nature experience parks).

== Categories ==
The three categories of natural "parks of national importance" established by the Federal Act on the Protection of Nature and Cultural Heritage (section 3b) are national parks, regional nature parks and nature experience parks.

National parks and nature experience parks have very strict protected areas, something which does not exist in regional nature parks. The latter focus much more on striking a balance in the level of support between nature conservation and the regional economy.

== List of nature parks in Switzerland ==
As of 2016, the eighteen official nature "parks of national importance" in Switzerland are:

- National parks (1)
  - Swiss National Park
- Regional nature parks (16)
  - Aargau Jura Park
  - Beverin Nature Park
  - Binntal Nature Park
  - Chasseral Nature Park
  - Diemtigtal Nature Park
  - Doubs Nature Park
  - Parc Ela
  - UNESCO Entlebuch Biosphere
  - Gantrisch Nature Park
  - Gruyère Pays-d'Enhaut Nature Park
  - Jura vaudois Nature Park
  - Pfyn-Finges Nature Park
  - Thal Nature Park
  - Val Müstair Biosphere
- Nature experience parks (1)
  - Wildnispark Zurich Sihlwald
- Candidate national parks
  - Parc Adula
  - Locarnese National Park Project
- Candidate regional nature park
  - Schaffhausen Regional Nature Park

== Nature reserves ==
The environmental organisation Pro Natura takes care of about 650 nature reserves of various sizes throughout Switzerland (250 square kilometres).

== See also ==
- Environmental movement in Switzerland
- Federal Inventory of Landscapes and Natural Monuments
- Federal Office for the Environment
- World Network of Biosphere Reserves in Europe and North America
- List of nature parks in Germany
