= Sihlwald =

Forest in Zurich, Switzerland

Coordinates: 47.254°N 8.556°E

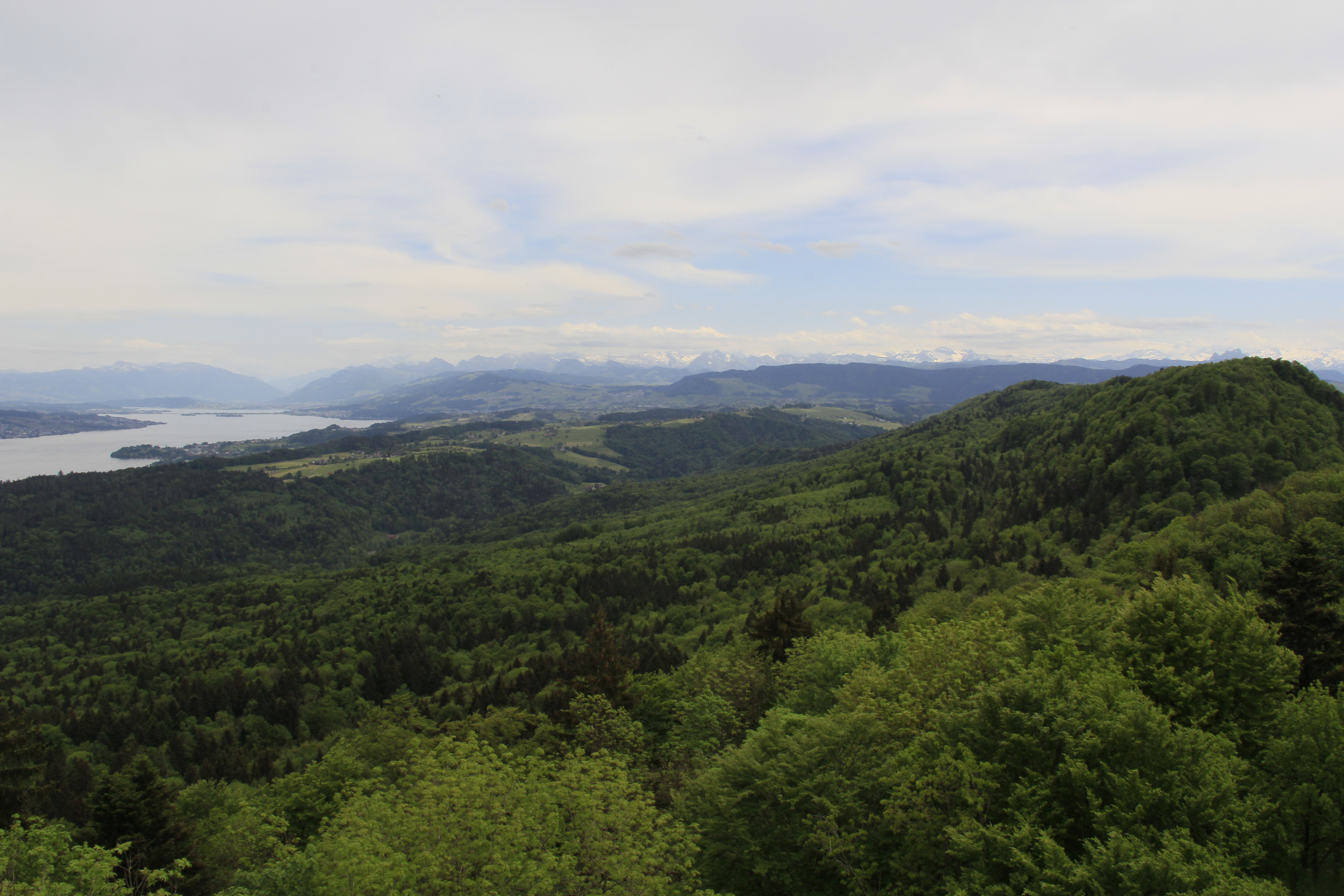
The Sihlwald seen from the Hochwach lookout-tower with Sihl valley, Zimmerberg hills, Lake Zürich and the Alps beyond

The Sihlwald is a forest and nature reserve in the Sihl Valley of the Swiss canton of Zürich. It is a rare example of a large-scale and original forest, situated on the eastern slopes of the Albis hills to the west side of the Sihl river. Although the forest is owned by the city of Zürich, it is situated outside the city boundary, within the municipality of Horgen and several adjoining municipalities. The Sihlwald now forms part of the Zürich Wilderness Park.

The city of Zürich received the Sihl forest, or Sihlwald, as a gift in 1309 from the Hapsburgers and again in 1524 through the dissolution of the Fraumünster convent. Over the following centuries, the forest provided Zürich with timber and firewood. From 1876 on, there was even a forest railway which facilitated the work in the forest. However, the trees have not been felled since the 1990s; this is due to the actions of forest director Andreas Speich, in order to preserve the forest's unique composition. On August 28, 2009, the Federal Office for the Environment declared the Sihl forest a "regional nature park of national importance". The protection of Sihl forest was established through a forest reserve agreement in 2007 and a cantonal Protection Ordinance in 2008. In 2009, the management of the Sihlwald was combined with that of the nearby Langenberg Wildlife Park, to form the Zürich Wilderness Park.

The forest can be reached via the Sihlwald railway station, served by service S4 of the Zurich S-Bahn.

== Picture gallery ==
Spherical panoramic in Sihlwald in autumn (view as a 360° interactive panorama)

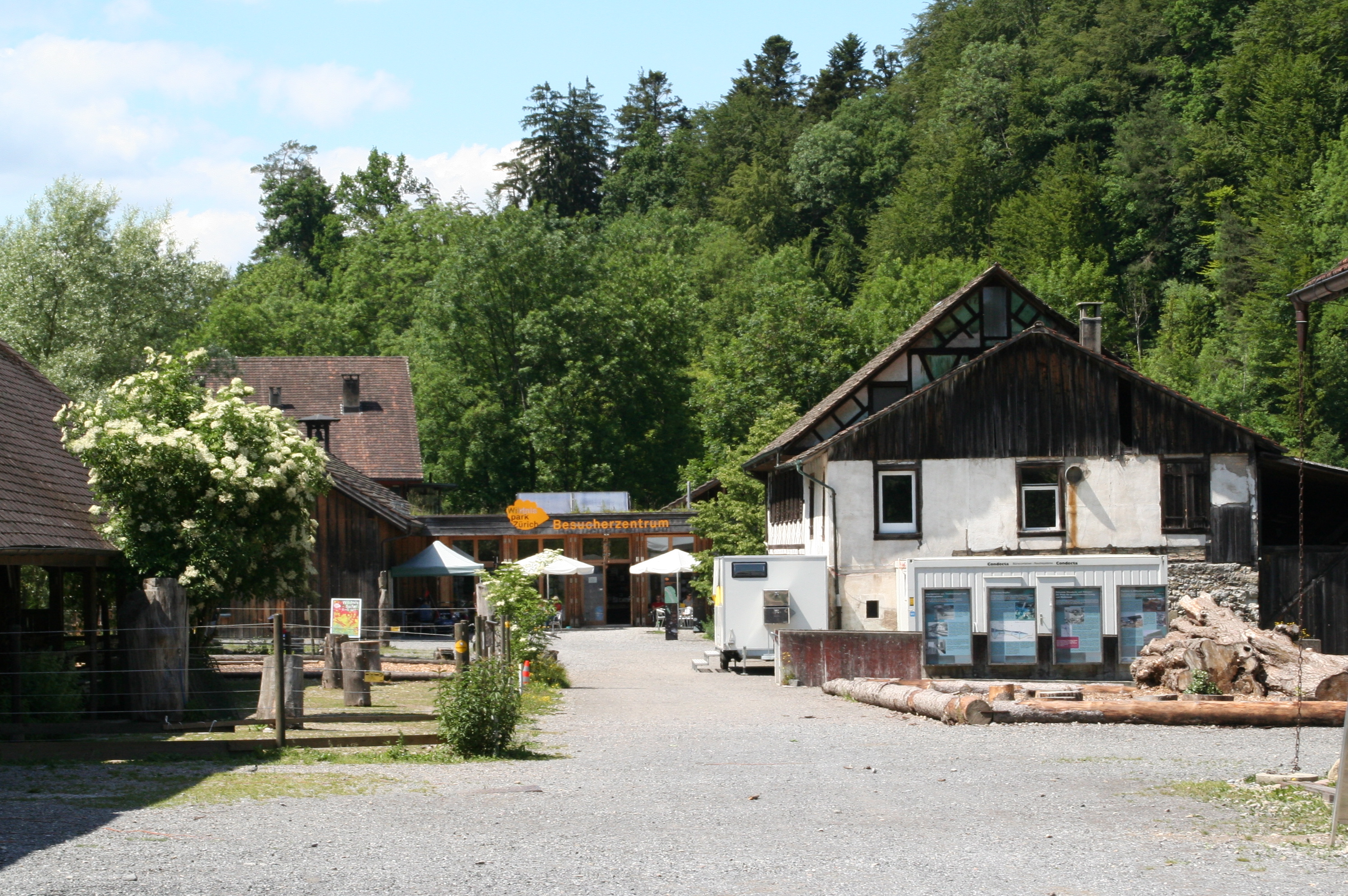
The Sihlwald visitors centre

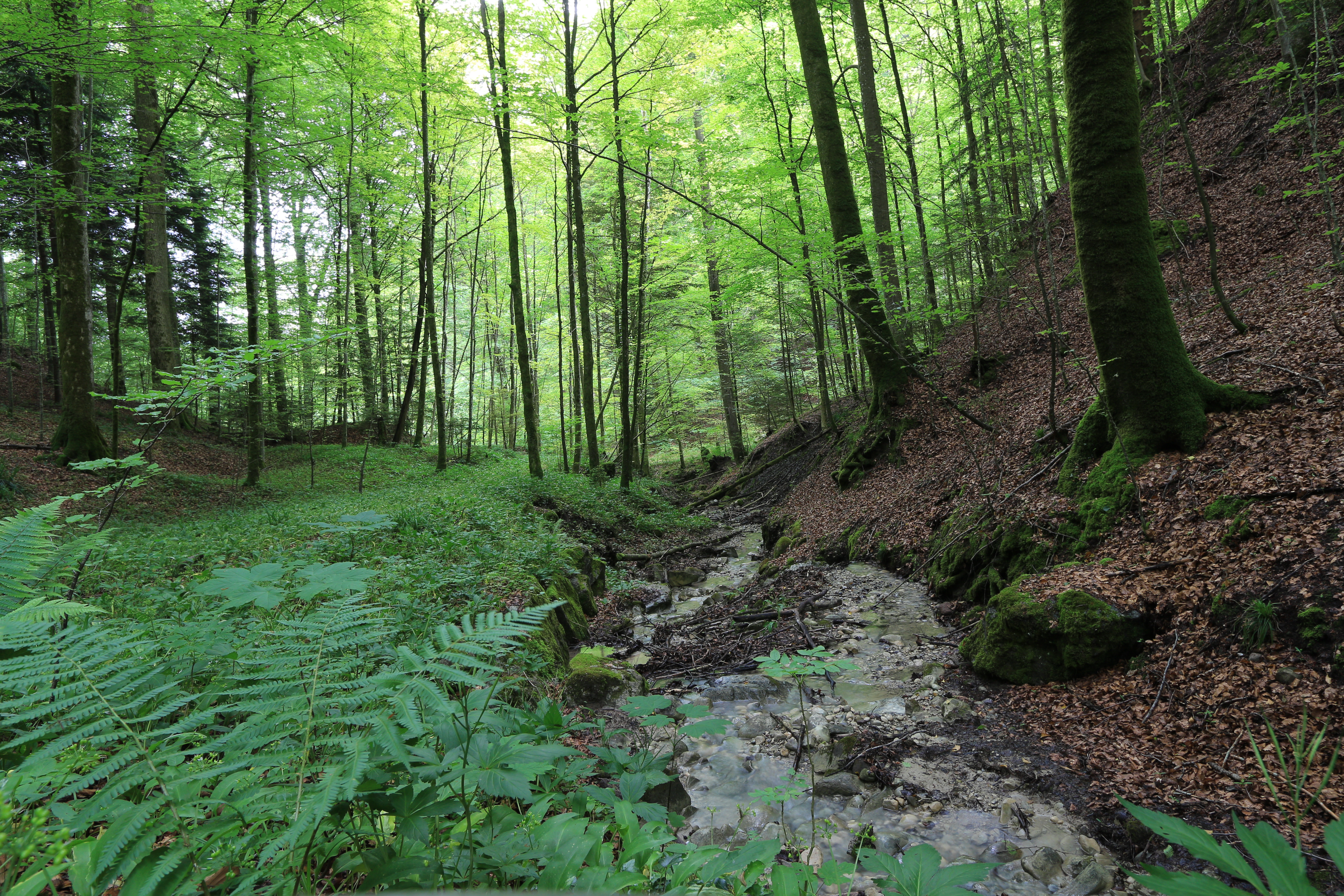
A stream in the forest

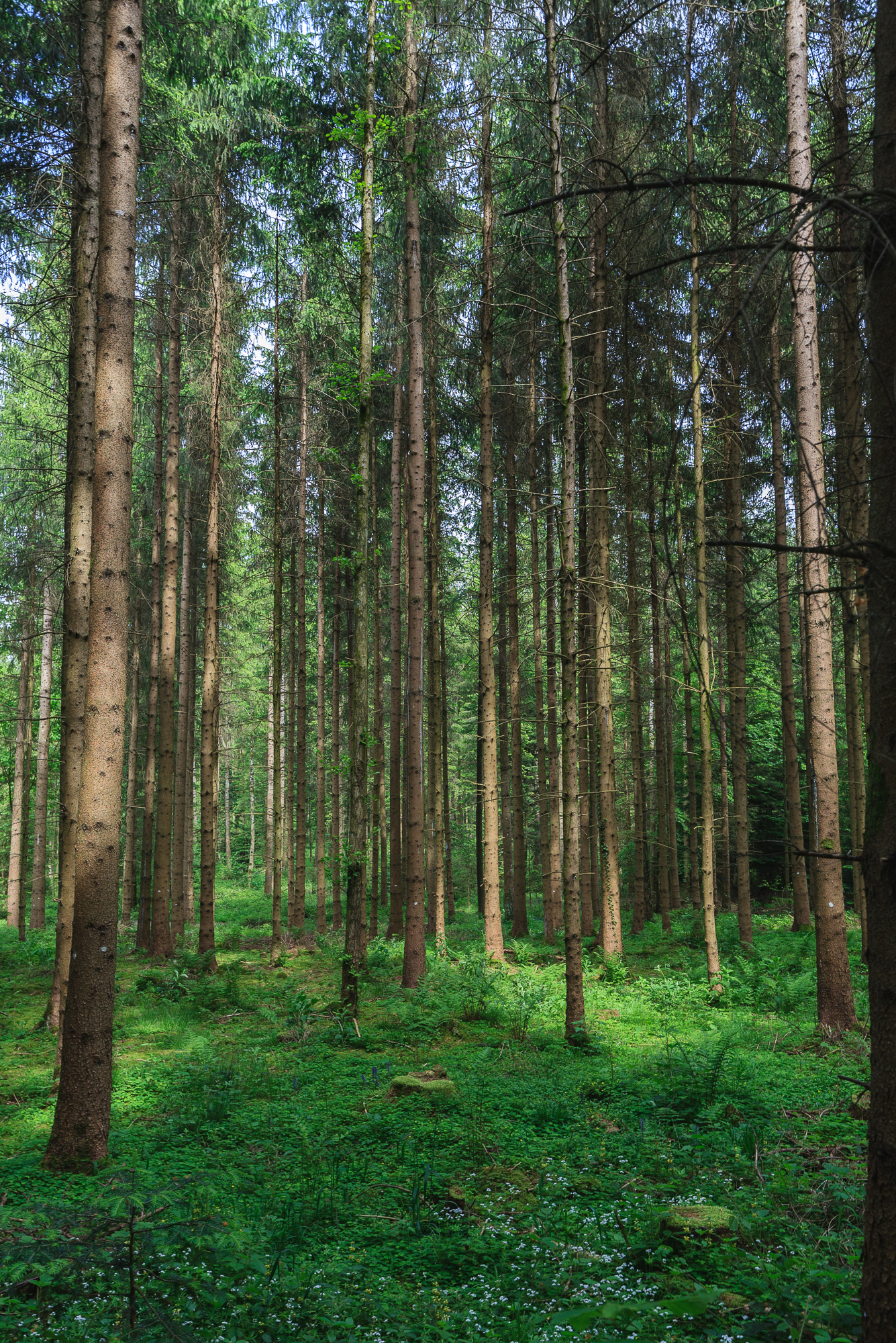
View from Forest Nature Trail

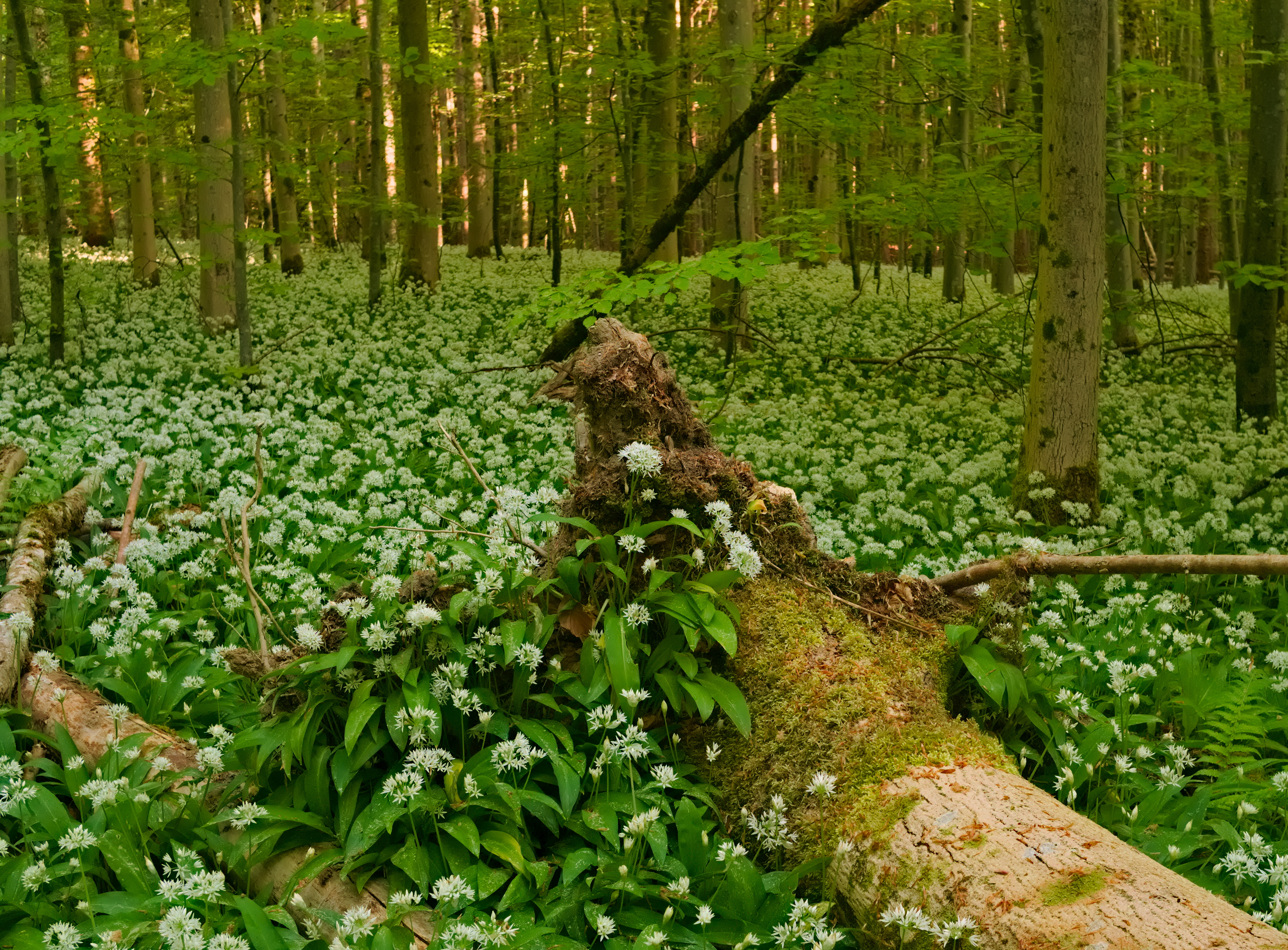
Ramson (allium ursinum) blooming
