= Piz Ela =

Mountain in Switzerland

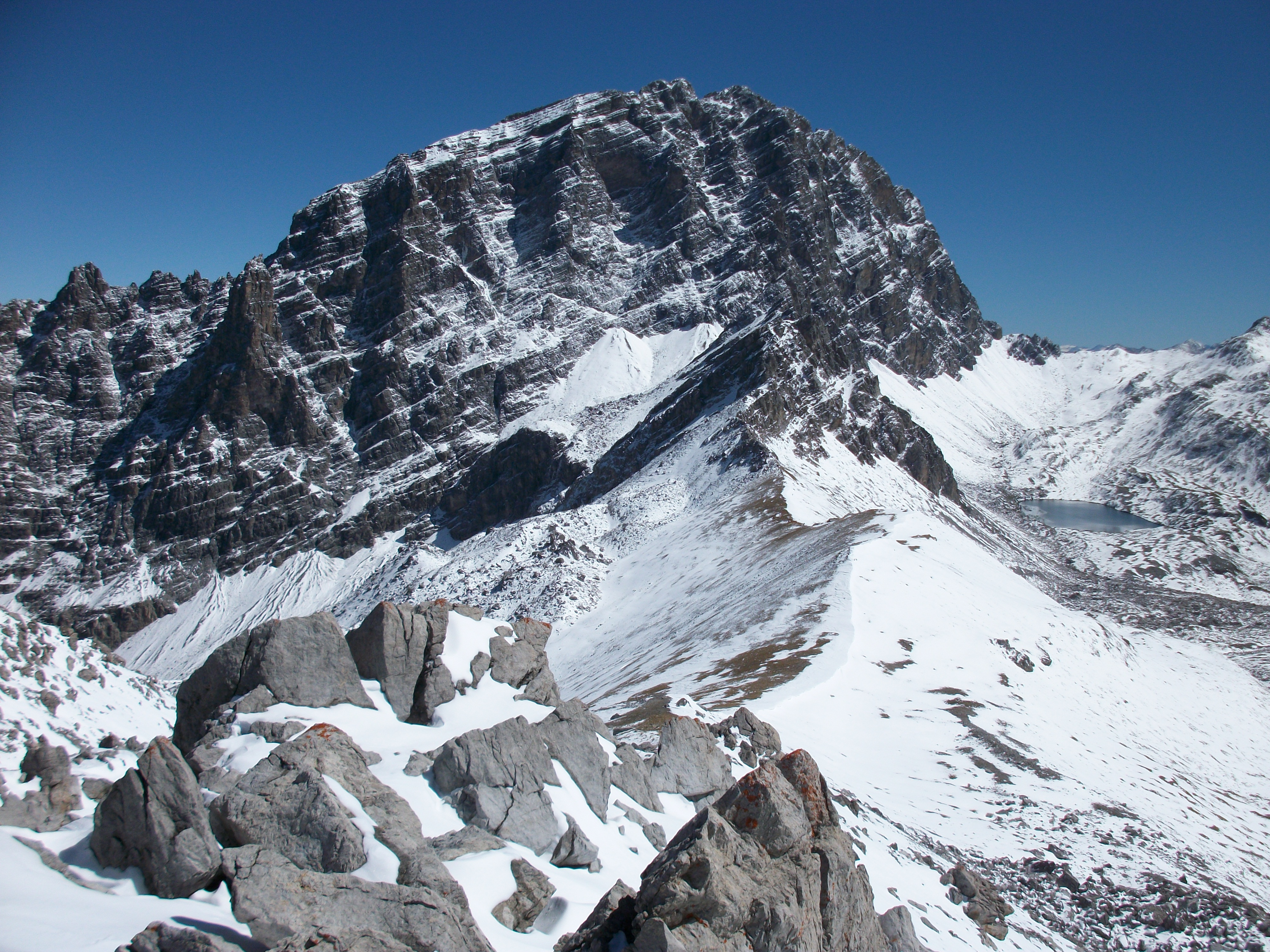
- Piz Ela from the west side

Highest point
- Elevation: 3,339 m (10,955 ft)
- Prominence: 515 m (1,690 ft)
- Parent peak: Piz Calderas
- Isolation: 6.3 km (3.9 mi)
- Listing: Alpine mountains above 3000 m
- Coordinates: 46°36′07″N 9°42′28″E

Geography
- Location within Switzerland
- Location: Graubünden, Switzerland
- Parent range: Albula Range

Piz Ela is a mountain in the Albula Alps, overlooking Bergün, in the Swiss canton of Graubünden. It is located in the center of the nature park Parc Ela.

There is a lake called Lai Grond to the south of Piz Ela.

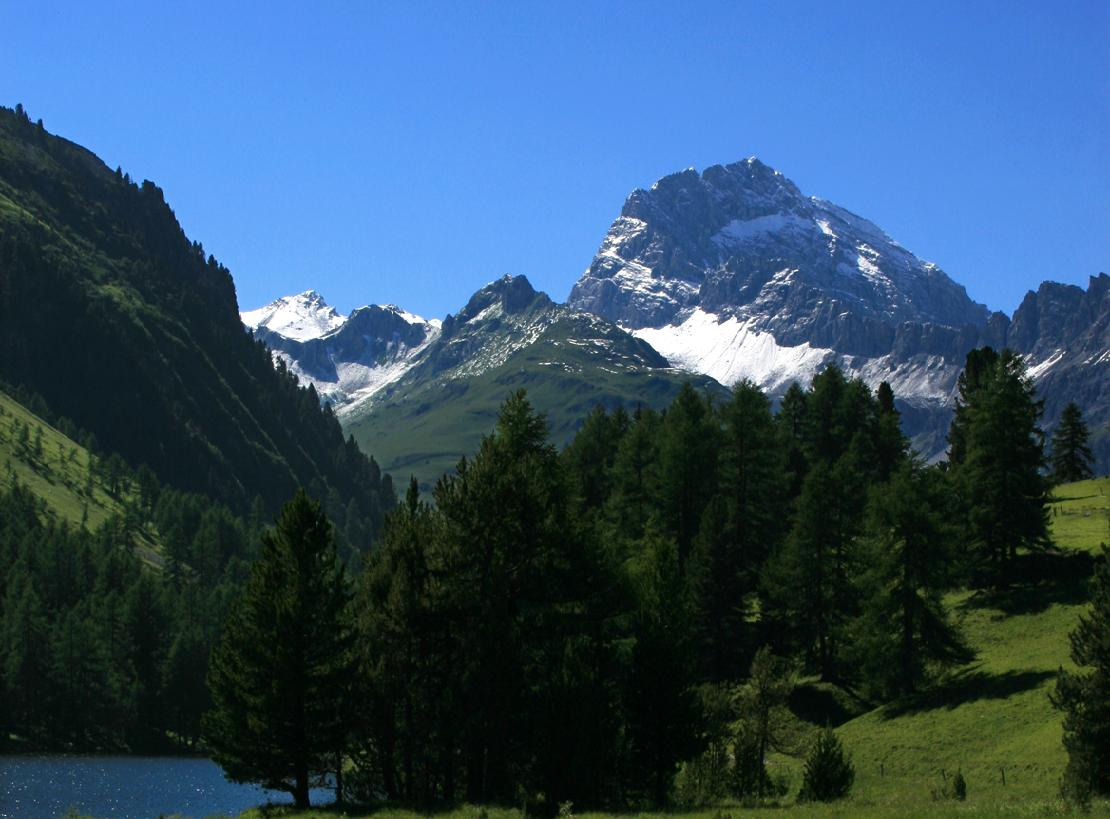
View from near the Albula Pass (east side)
