= Lai da Marmorera =

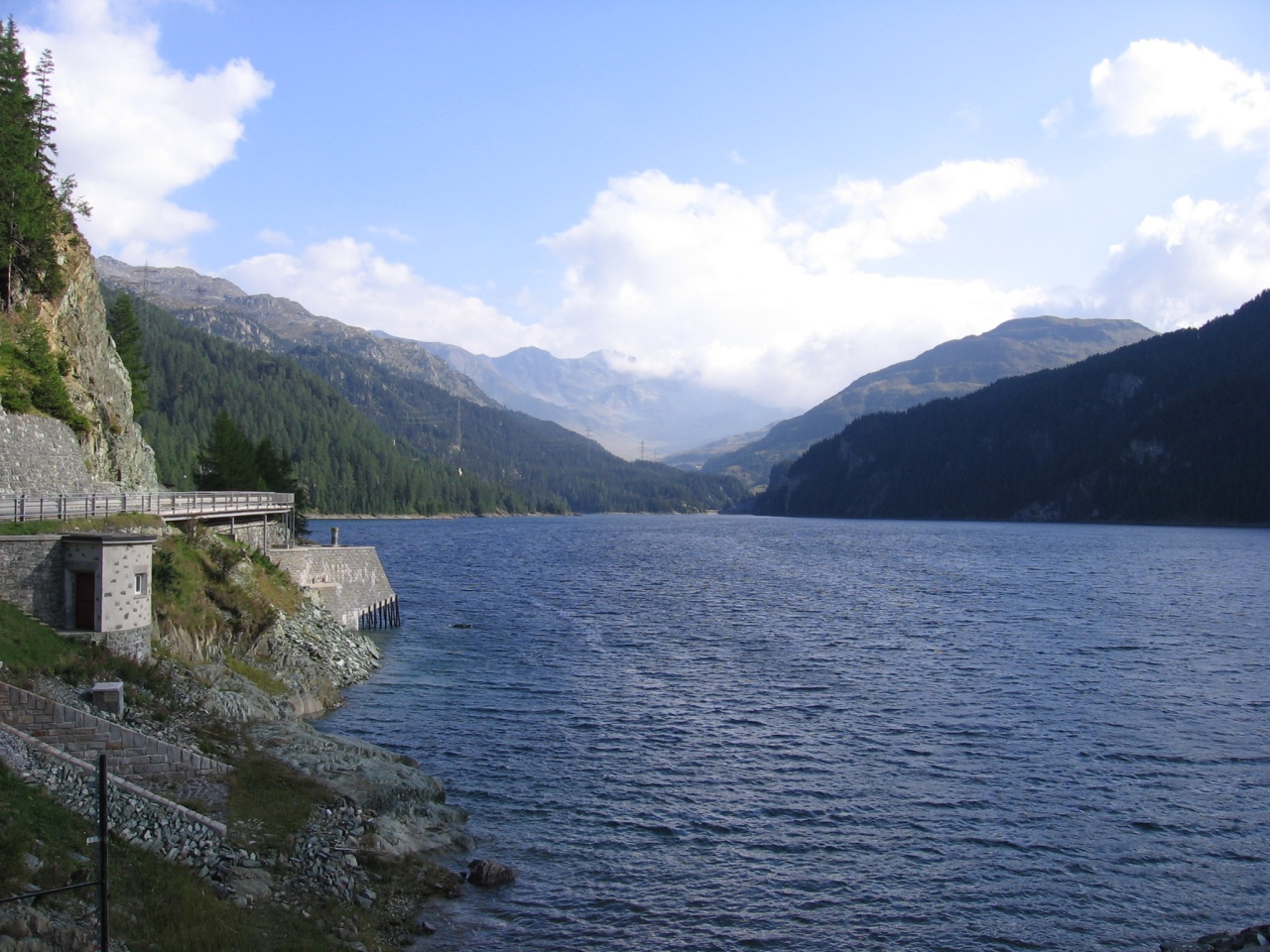

- Location within Canton of Graubünden Location within Switzerland Location within Italy Location within Alps
- Interactive map of Lai da Marmorera
- Location: Grisons
- Coordinates: 46°29′59″N 9°38′13″E
- Type: reservoir
- Primary inflows: Gelgia
- Primary outflows: Gelgia
- Catchment area: 89.0 km^{2} (34.4 sq mi)
- Basin countries: Switzerland
- Max. length: 2.6 km (1.6 mi)
- Surface area: 1.41 km^{2} (0.54 sq mi)
- Max. depth: 65 m (213 ft)
- Surface elevation: 1,680 m (5,510 ft)
- Settlements: Marmorera

Lai da Marmorera is a reservoir in the Grisons, Switzerland. It is part of the Parc Ela nature park.

The lake with a surface area of 1.41 km^{2} (0.54 sq mi) formed after the completion of the Marmorera dam in 1954 when the old village of Marmorera was flooded. The village was rebuilt above the lake. The 2007 Swiss mystery film Marmorera was filmed in Marmorera and at the dam reservoir.

The lake is flanked on one side by the route of the Julier Pass.

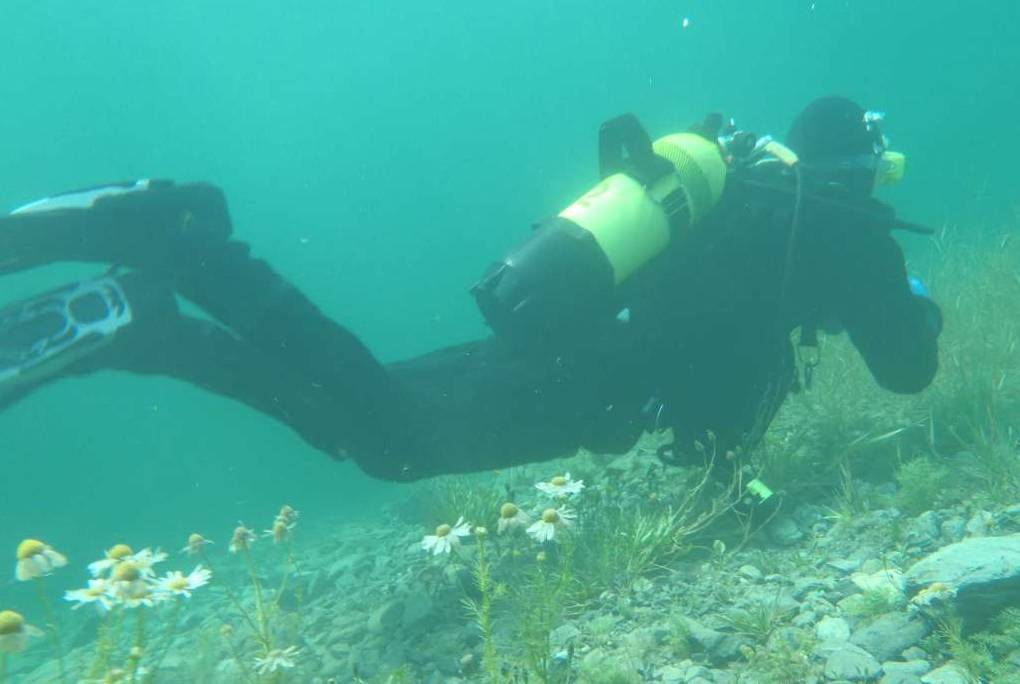
SCUBA diver in the lake Lai da Marmorera

== See also ==
- List of lakes of Switzerland
- List of mountain lakes of Switzerland
