= Mayon Volcano Natural Park =

Natural park in Bicol Region, Philippines

- Mayon Volcano
- IUCN category III (natural monument or feature)
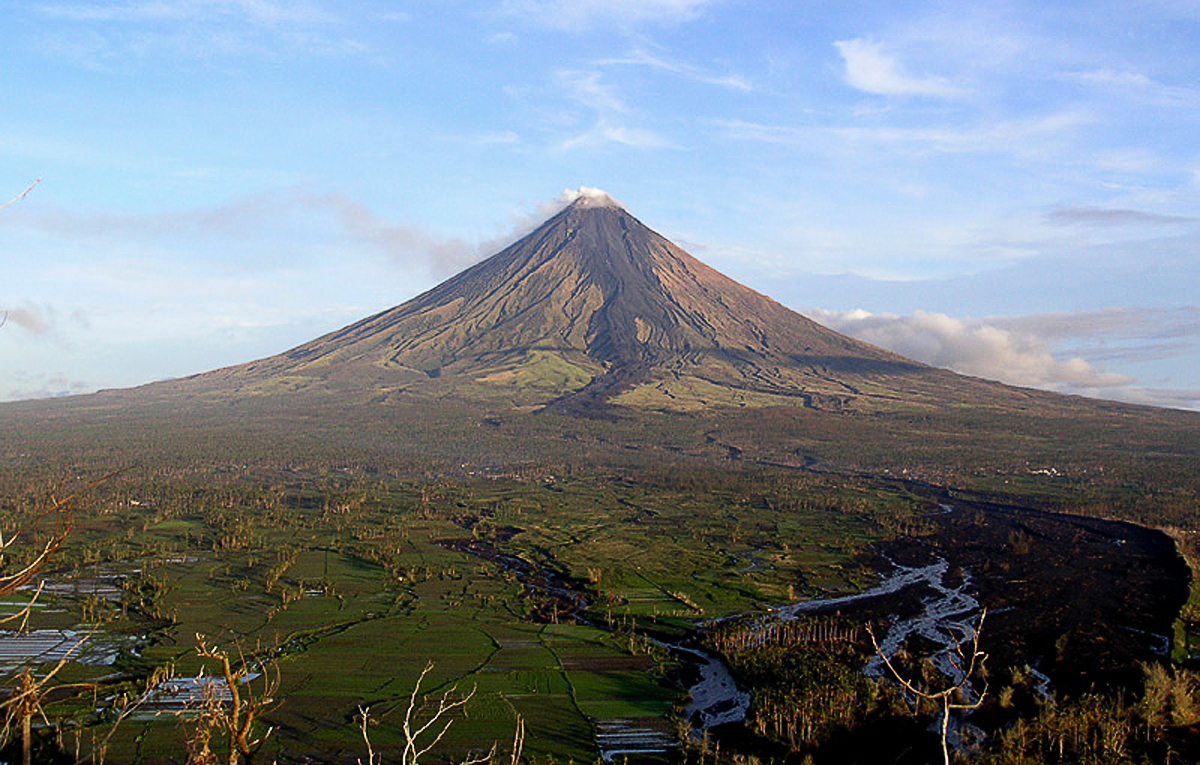
- The centerpiece of the natural park, the almost perfect cone of Mayon Volcano

- Location within Albay Location within Luzon Location within Philippines
- Location: Albay
- Nearest city: Legazpi, Ligao, Tabaco
- Coordinates: 13°15′24″N 123°41′6″E
- Area: 5,775.7 hectares (14,272 acres)
- Established: July 20, 1938 (National park); November 21, 2000 (Natural park)
- Governing body: Protected Areas and Wildlife Bureau of the Department of Environment and Natural Resources

The Mayon Volcano Natural Park is a protected area of the Philippines located in the Bicol Region (Region 5) on southeast Luzon Island, the largest island of the country. The natural park covers an area of 5,775.7 hectares (14,272 acres), which includes its centerpiece Mayon Volcano, the most active volcano in the Philippines, and its adjacent surroundings. The volcano is also renowned for having an almost perfect cone. First protected as a National Park in 1938, it was reclassified as a Natural Park in the year 2000.

== Geography ==
Mayon Volcano Natural Park encompasses an area of 5,775.7 hectares (14,272 acres) located in the eight cities and municipalities that has jurisdiction of the volcano. These communities are Camalig, Daraga, Guinobatan, Legazpi, Ligao, Tabaco, Malilipot, and Santo Domingo, all in the province of Albay. The peak of the volcano is the highest elevation in the Bicol Region at 2,462 metres (8,077 ft).

== History ==
The protected area was first declared as Mayon Volcano National Park, with an initial area of 5,458.65 hectares (13,488.6 acres), on July 20, 1938, by Proclamation no. 292 during the Commonwealth presidency of Manuel L. Quezon. In 1992, the Republic Act No. 7586 or the National Integrated Protected Areas System (NIPAS) Act was established to create, designate, classify and administered by the Department of Environment and Natural Resources, all the protected areas of the country for the present and future generations of the Filipino people. Under NIPAS, the Mayon Volcano National Park was reclassified and renamed as Mayon Volcano Natural Park with the signing of Proclamation No. 412 on November 21, 2000. The natural park was ultimately declared a national park under Republic Act No. 11038 (Expanded National Integrated Protected Areas System Act of 2018) signed by President Rodrigo Duterte in July 2018.

== Image gallery ==
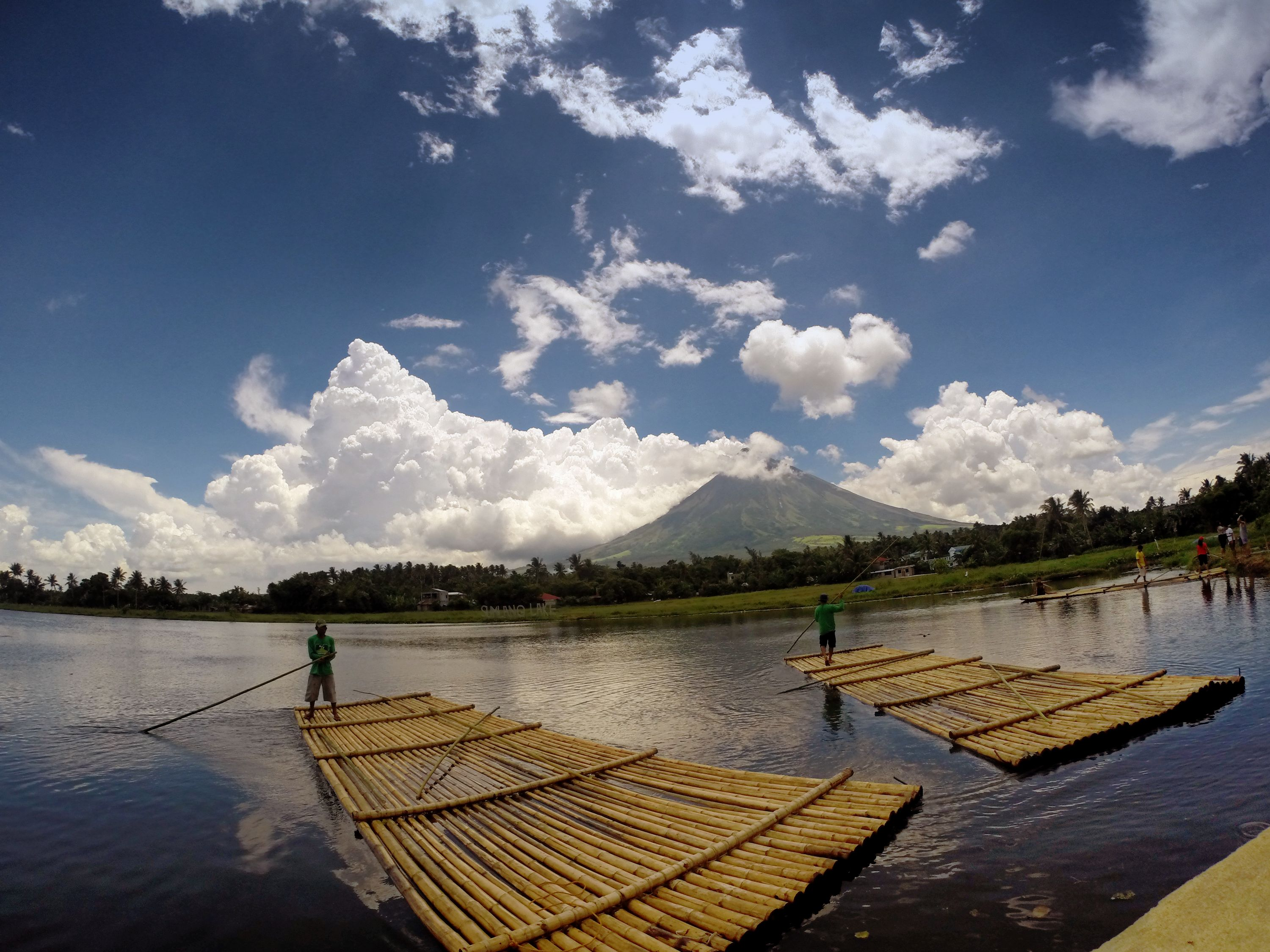
View of Mt. Mayon via Sumlang Lake in Albay

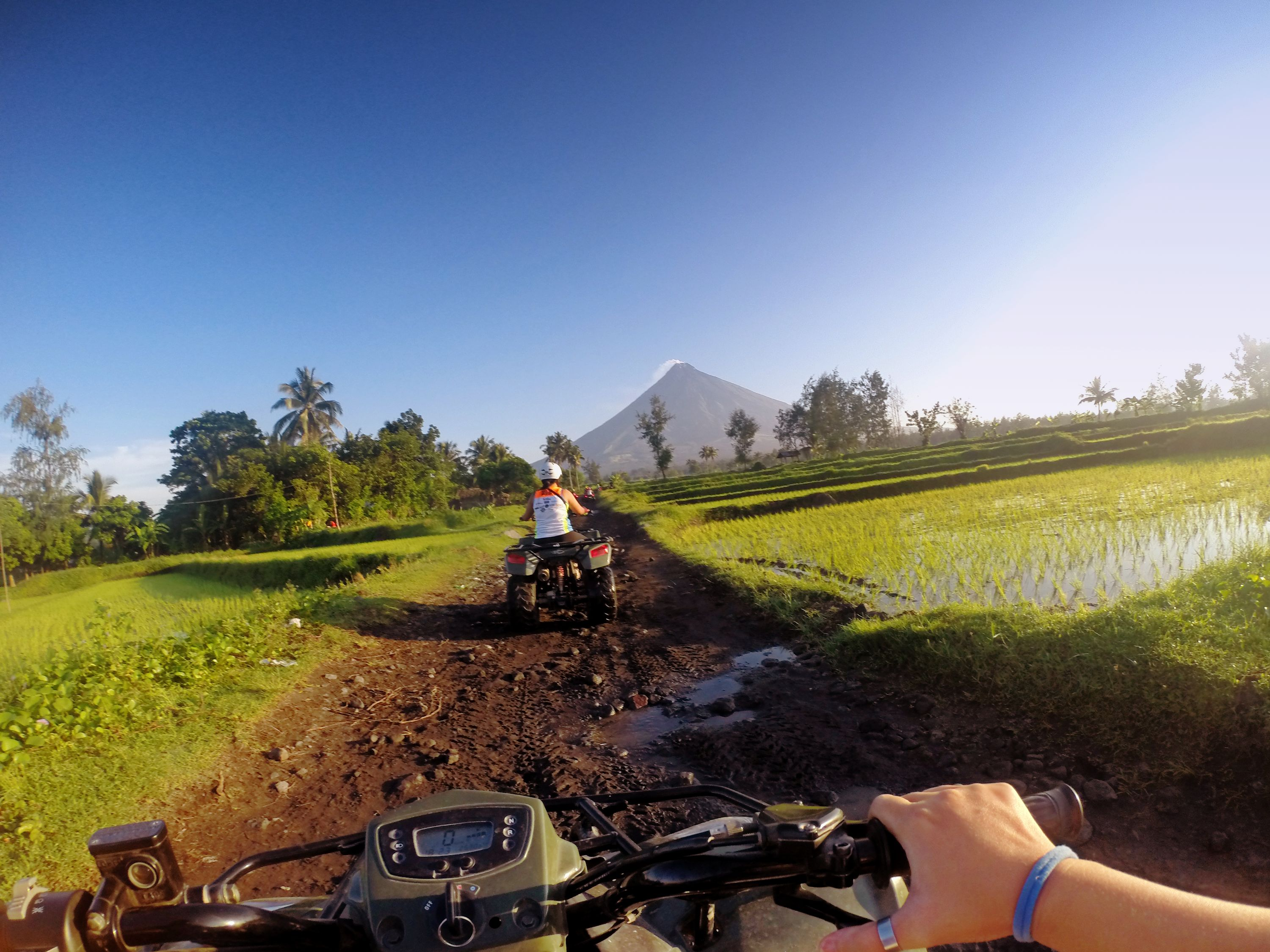
ATV adventure at Mt. Mayon

== See also ==
- List of protected areas of the Philippines
