= Carl Anton Ludwig von Orelli =

Swiss forester and zoologist

- Born: 28 September 1808; Zurich, Switzerland
- Died: 28 January 1890 (aged 81); Langnau am Albis, Switzerland
- Occupation: Forester
- Known for: Founder of Langenberg Wildlife Park
- Spouse: Adelheid Grab (divorced 1852)
- Parent(s): Ludwig von Orelli; Esther von Grebel

Carl Anton Ludwig von Orelli (28 September 1808 – 28 January 1890) was a Swiss forester and the founder of the Langenberg Wildlife Park.

== Early life and military career ==
Orelli was born in Zurich on 28 September 1808, the son of Lieutenant-Colonel Ludwig von Orelli and Esther von Grebel. He attended the Federal Central School in Thun. In 1826, he became a lieutenant in Zurich and subsequently served in the French military from 1826 to 1830, followed by service in Württemberg in 1831.

== Forestry career ==
From 1832 to 1834, Orelli studied at the forestry academy in Hohenheim, Württemberg. In 1835, he was appointed inspector of forests for the city of Zurich, a position he held until 1875. During his tenure, Orelli rationalized the management of Zurich's forest holdings and established collaboration between the city and the forestry school of the Swiss Federal Institute of Technology.

== Political activities and later life ==
Orelli served as a deputy in the Grand Council of Zurich from 1875 to 1881. He was also a member of the noble society of the Schildner zum Schneggen from 1873.

In 1869, Orelli founded the Langenberg Wildlife Park, which became an important zoological facility near Zurich.

Orelli married Adelheid Grab, daughter of Gottlob Grab of Pforzheim. The couple divorced in 1852. He died in Langnau am Albis on 28 January 1890.

== See also ==
- Orelli family

== Bibliography ==
- Meister, U. (1890). Karl Anton Ludwig von Orelli, alt Stadtforstmeister, von Zürich.
- "200 Jahre Carl Anton Ludwig von O.". Grünzeit, 27 (2008), pp. 6–10.
