= Langenberg Wildlife Park =

Coordinates: 47.293°N 8.529°E

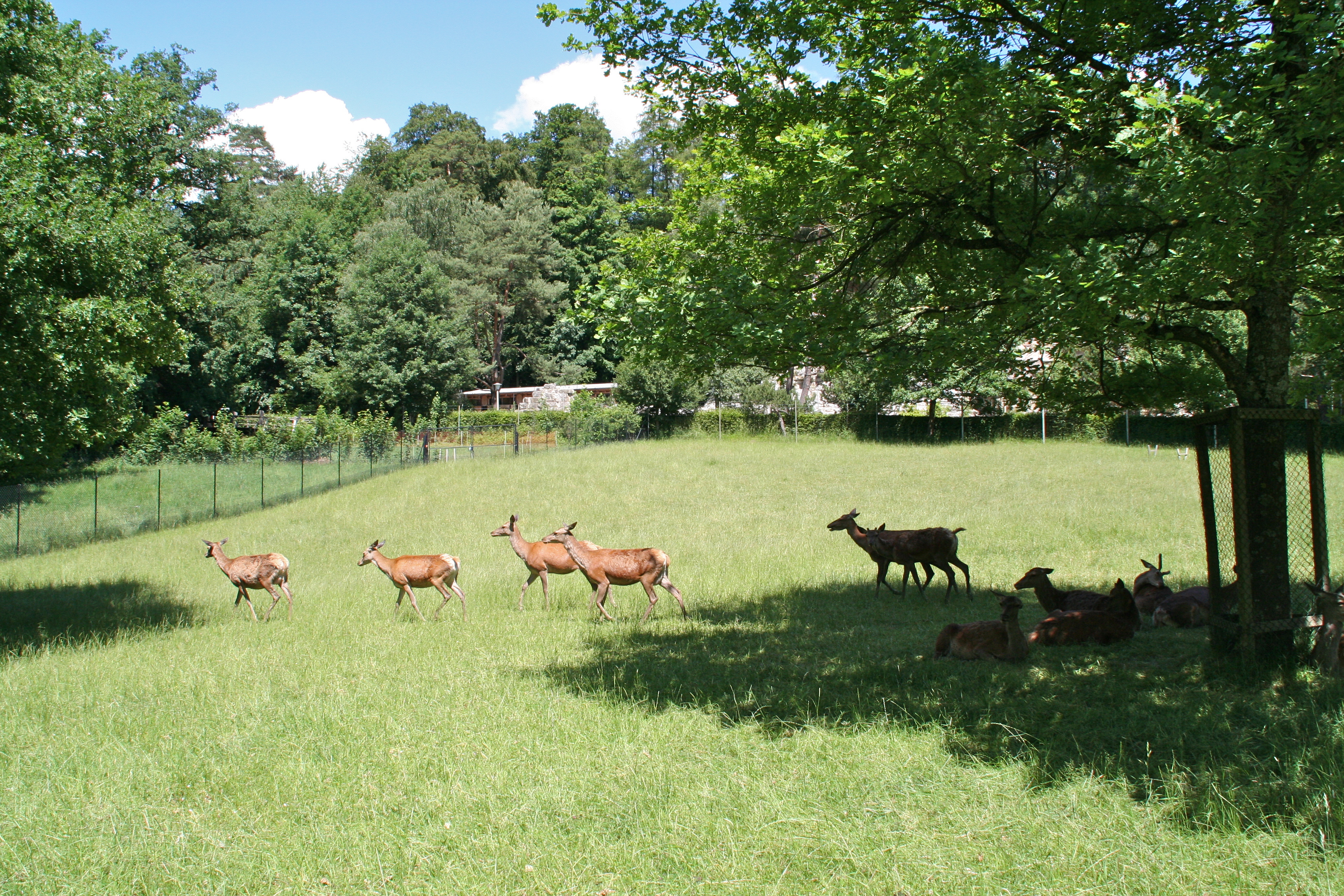
- Red deer in the park
- Interactive map of Langenberg Wildlife Park
- Date opened: 1869
- Location: municipality of Langnau am Albis, Sihl Valley, south of Zürich, Switzerland
- No. of animals: 16
- Public transit: Wildpark-Höfli railway station, service S4 of Zurich S-Bahn

Langenberg Wildlife Park (German: Tierpark Langenberg) is a zoo situated in the municipality of Langnau am Albis in the Sihl Valley to the south of the city of Zürich in Switzerland. The wildlife park now forms part of the Zürich Wilderness Park.

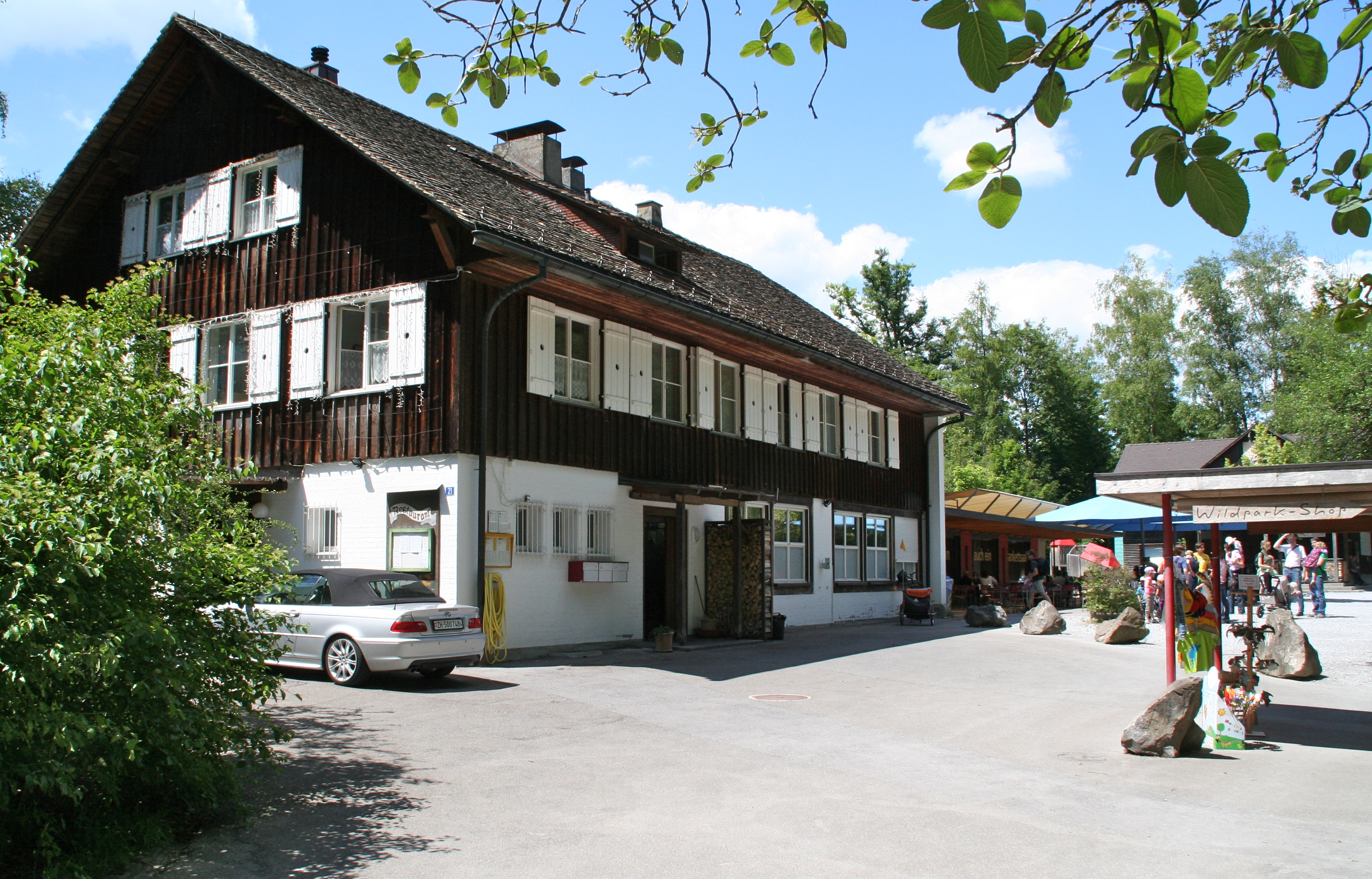
The wildlife park's restaurant

The park was founded in 1869 by the Zürich city forester Carl Anton Ludwig von Orelli, making it the oldest Swiss wildlife park. In 2009, the management of the Langenberg Wildlife Park was combined with that of the nearby Sihlwald forest, to form the Zürich Wilderness Park.

Langenberg is home to around 20 native or formerly native animals such as bears, beavers, elk, hare, lynxes, wild boar, and wolves. In 2012, European bison and Przewalski’s horse were introduced to the park.

The wildlife park can be reached via the Wildpark-Höfli railway station, served by service S4 of the Zurich S-Bahn or by bus (Stop Langnau am Albis, Schwerzi-Wildpark or Langnau am Albis, Altersheim).
