= Parc Ela =

Protected area in Switzerland

Coordinates: 46°35′39″N 9°41′35″E

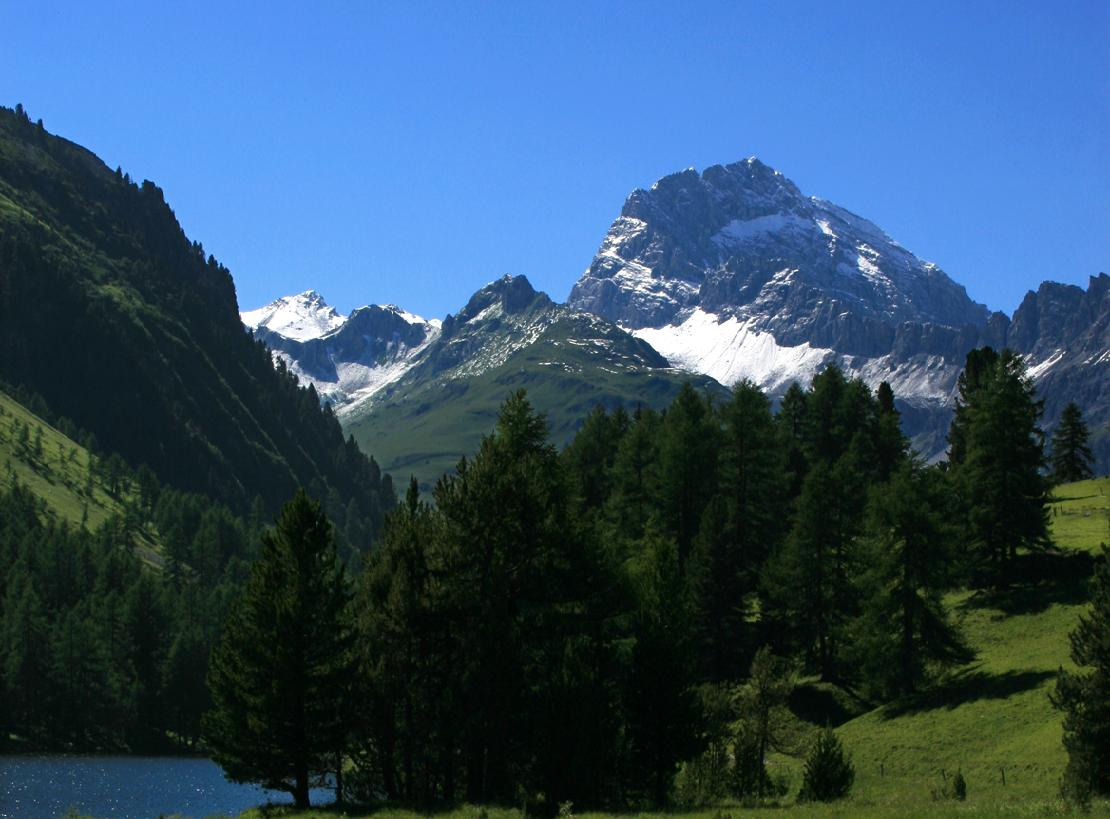
- Piz Ela
- Interactive map of Parc Ela
- Location: Switzerland
- Nearest city: Tiefencastel
- Area: 600 km^{2} (230 sq mi)
- Established: June 3, 2006

Parc Ela (Rumantsch: Ela Park) is a nature park in the canton of Graubünden, Switzerland. It is intended to protect the regional biotope, help to promote its sustainable use and give a boost to an area rich in scenery and national cultural assets, but weak economically.

Unlike Switzerland's only national park, which is reserved to nature alone, the Parc Ela covers the settled and cultivated territory of around 21 municipalities, notably Tiefencastel, Bergün, Savognin and Bivio. The park takes its name from Piz Ela, the 3,338-metre mountain peak at its center.

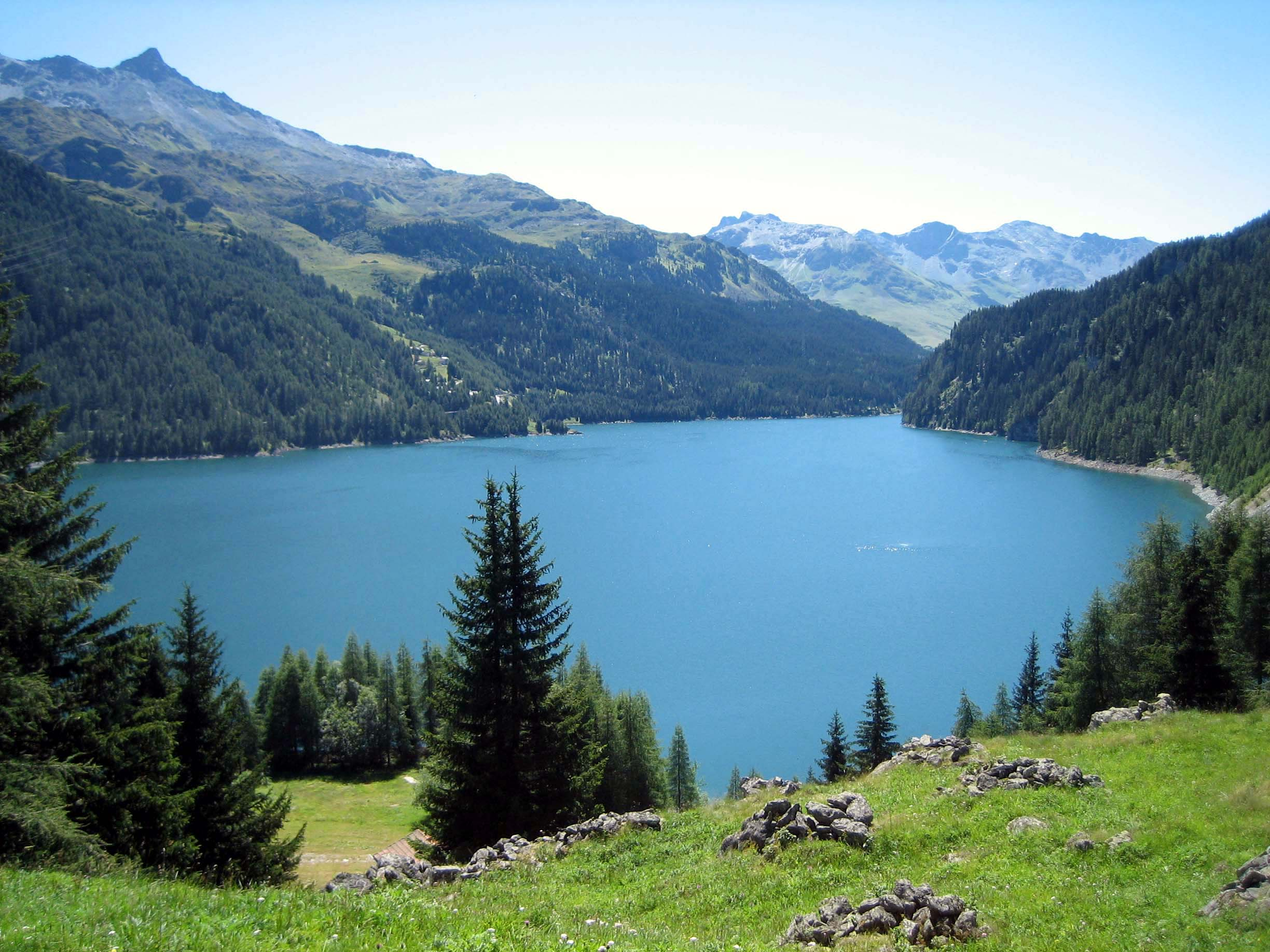
Lake Marmorera in the park

The park is organised as a private association of local activists, supported financially by contributions from the local municipalities, the cantons of Graubünden and Zürich and the conservation group Pro Natura, as well as by the goodwill of the Swiss federal government. Apart from road signs, visitors can see few actual indications that they are entering a protected area, as the park's activities focus on ecological, cultural, tourist and economical development and cooperation.

The park's legal recognition depends on a change in the Swiss law on the protection of nature and the countryside, which as of 2006 remained tied up in parliament due to disputes over whether federal financial support should be mandatory.

== See also ==
- Nature parks in Switzerland
