= Thal Nature Park =

Swiss nature reserve

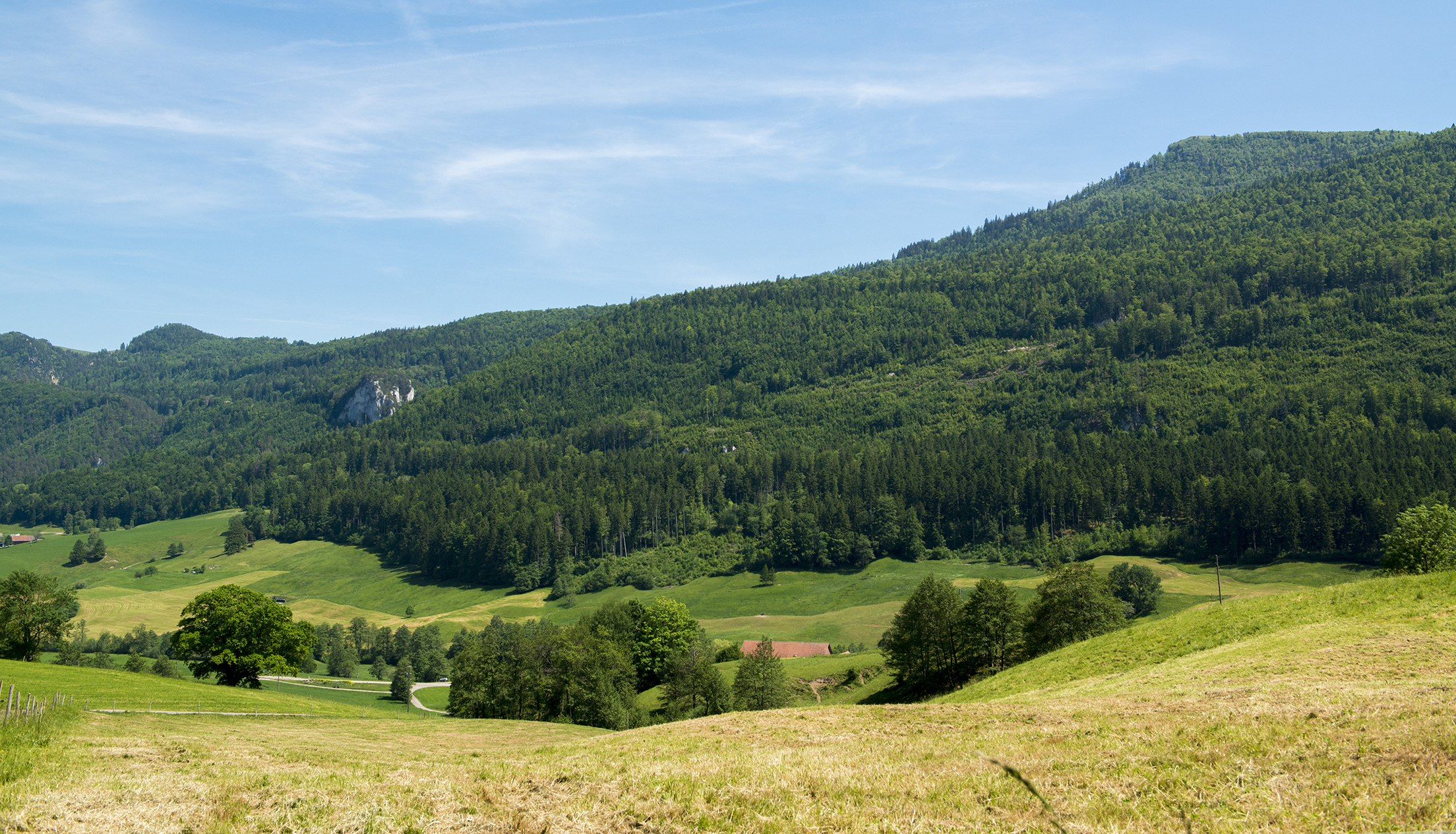
Thal Nature Park

Thal Nature Park (Naturpark Thal in German) is a nature reserve located in the Swiss Canton of Solothurn, bordering the cantons of Bern and Basel-Landschaft. The largest municipality in Thal Nature Park is Balsthal. It features the wide valley of the river Dünnern behind the Weissenstein mountain range. In 2012, the FOEN deemed the reserve a "park of national importance," a label that is effective for ten years from its instatement on January 1, 2010.

Fortress ruins point to its former history as a pack route through the small town of Klus, however, today the surrounding land serves mostly agricultural purposes.

The "Haar und Kamm" (hair and comb) Museum, a former comb factory, is also located in the park.

== See also ==
- Nature parks in Switzerland
