= Entlebuch Biosphere =

Protected area in Switzerland

Coordinates: 46°53′59″N 7°58′46″E

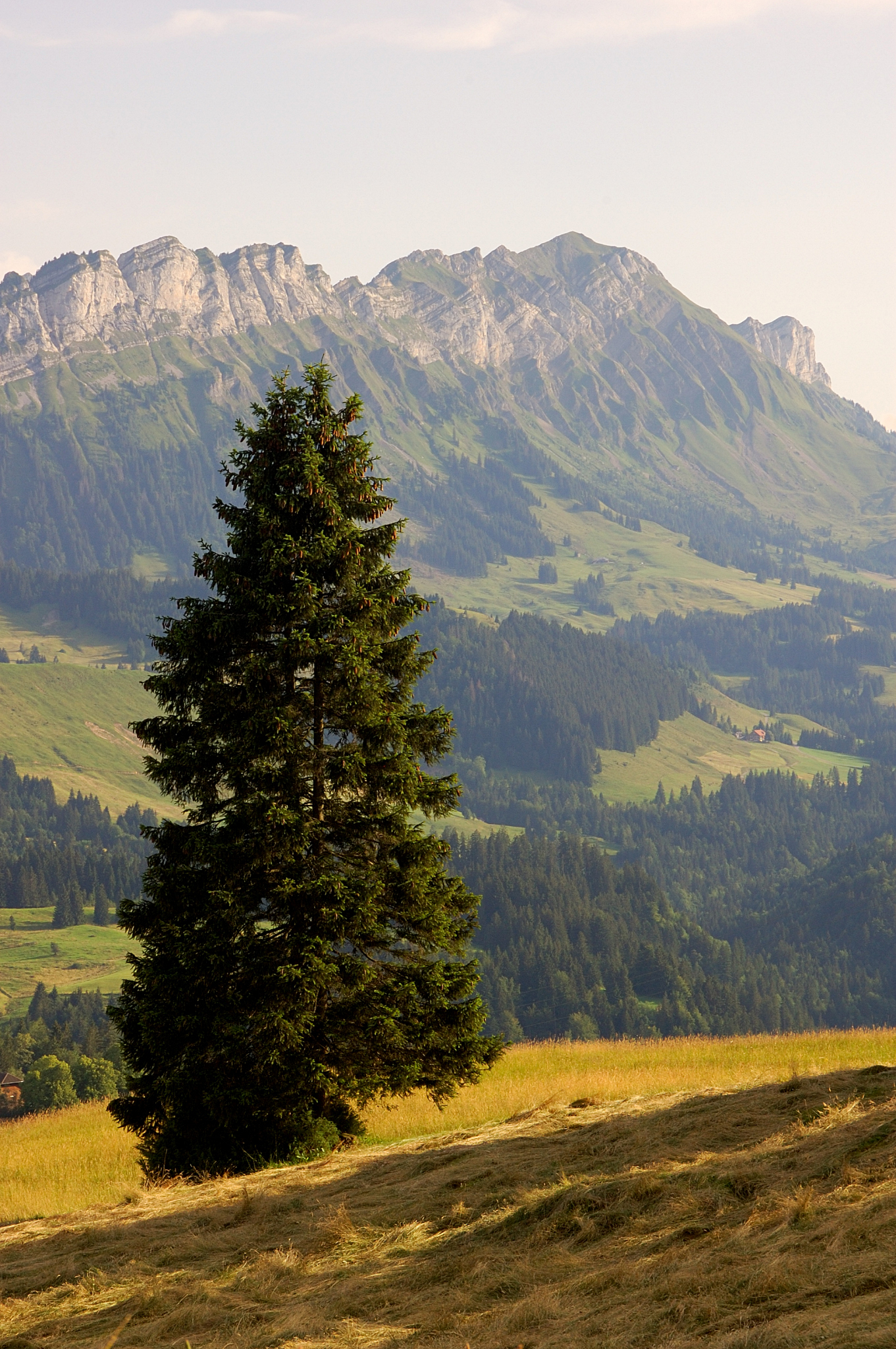
View from Finsterwald

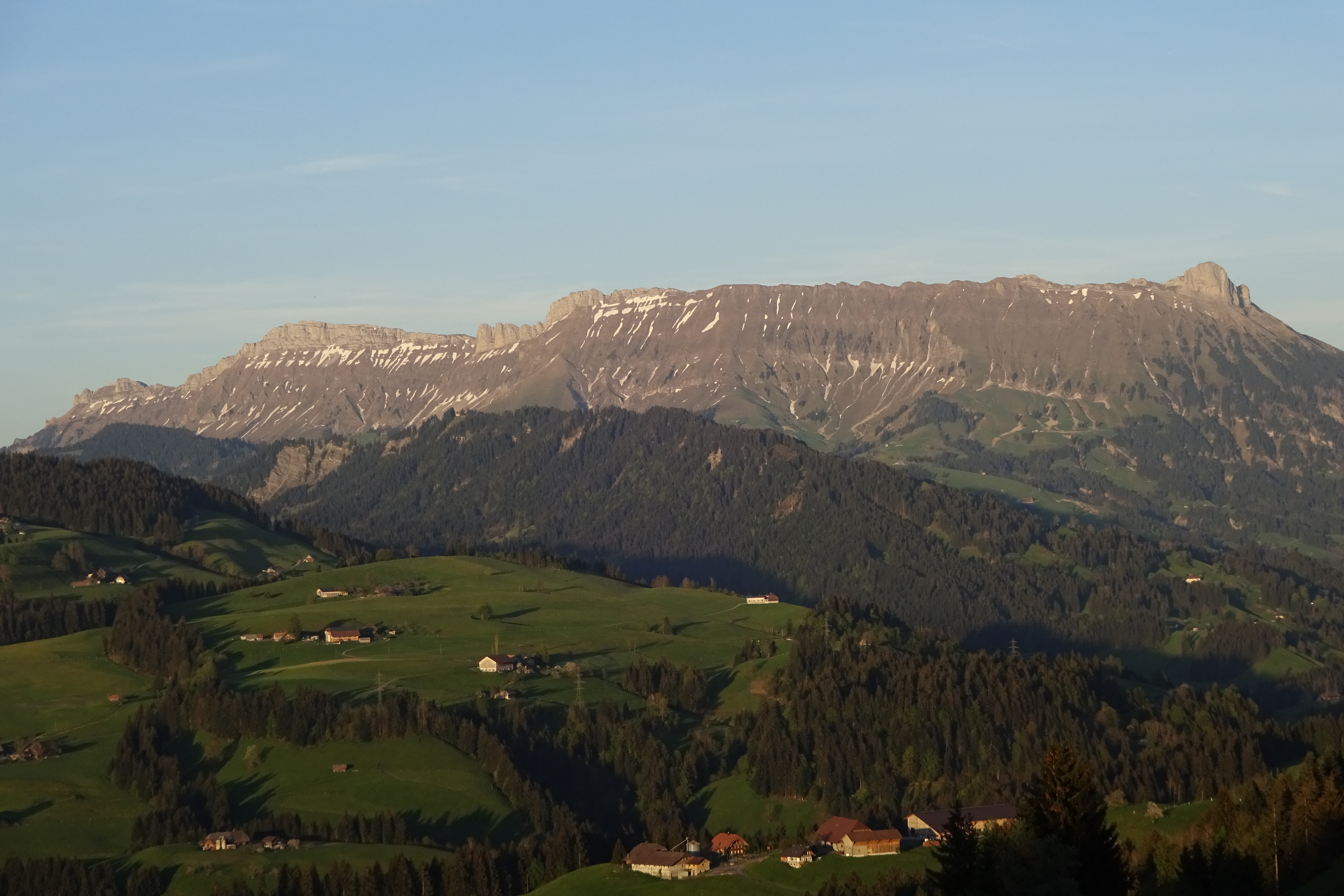
UNESCO Biosphere Entlebuch : Schrattenfluh (Hächlen, Hengst, Schybengütsch)

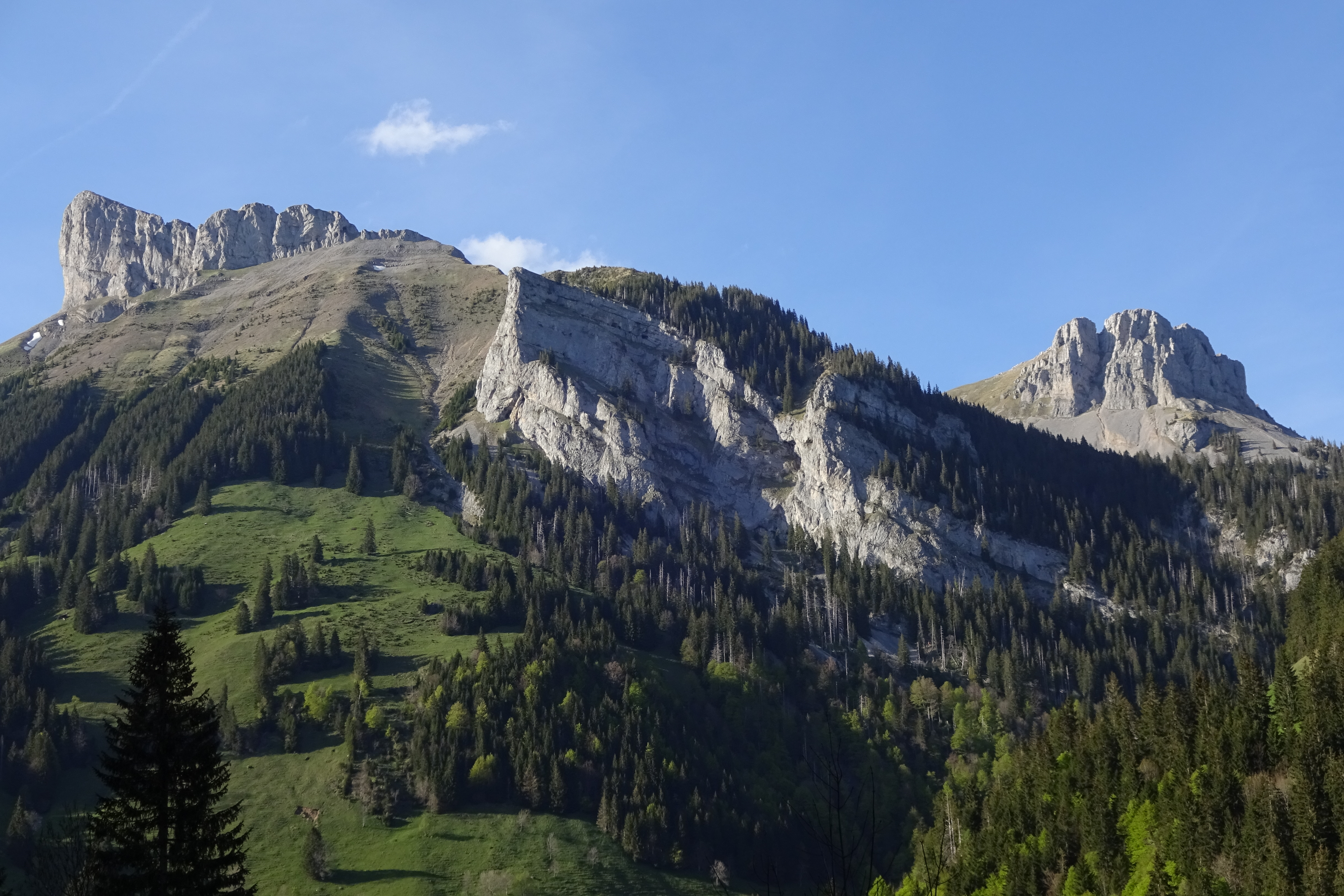
UNESCO Biosphere Entlebuch : Schrattenfluh (Schybengütsch)

The Entlebuch Biosphere is a UNESCO-designated biosphere reserve in the Swiss canton of Lucerne. Covering an area of approximately 395 square kilometres, it was designated in September 2001 as Switzerland’s first biosphere reserve under UNESCO’s updated criteria, which require both ecological conservation and sustainable human development. Nearly a third of the area is protected moorland, and the mountainous karst region of Schrattenfluh forms part of the core zone of the reserve.

The roots of the biosphere project trace back to 1987, when the Swiss public approved the Rothenthurm Initiative, establishing legal protections for moorland landscapes across the country. In response to new land-use restrictions, local authorities in Entlebuch began implementing the UNESCO biosphere model prior to receiving official recognition, using it as a framework for integrating conservation with rural development. The biosphere reserve includes a core zone of protected moorlands, a buffer zone for alpine pastureland, and a transition zone supporting environmentally sustainable activity in the inhabited valley floor.

== Geology ==
The Schrattenfluh, located in the core zone of the Entlebuch Biosphere, is a limestone karst massif characterized by fissured rock surfaces, dolines, and underground caves. These formations developed through the dissolution of calcium carbonate by mildly acidic rainwater. The area includes features such as the Silwängenhöhle, a cave accessible only with a guide.

== See also ==
- Entlebuch (district)
- Nature parks in Switzerland
- Tourism in Switzerland
