= Zürich Wilderness Park =

Protected area in Switzerland

- Wildnispark Zurich
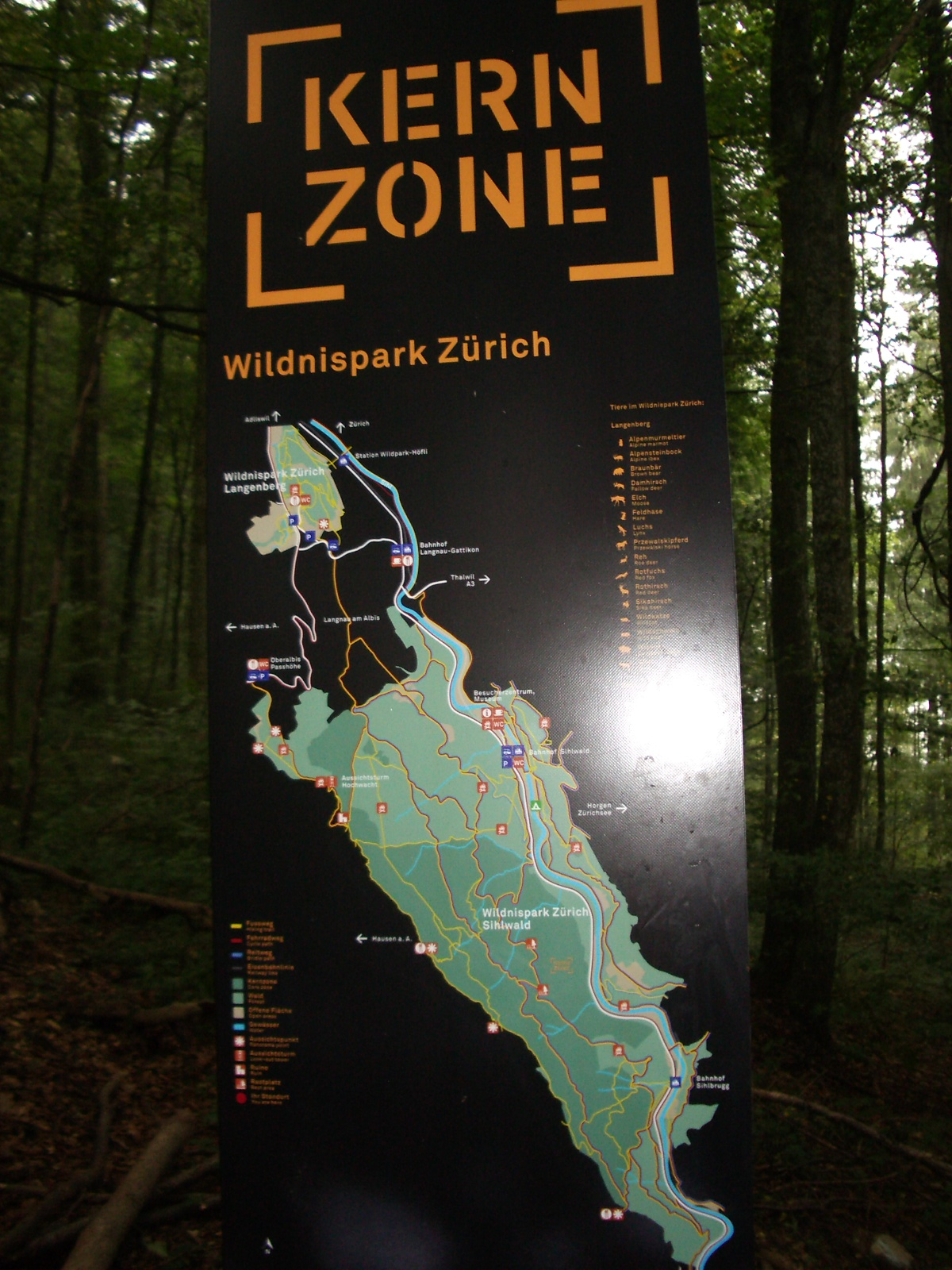
- Map showing the two sites of the Zürich Wilderness Park, with the Langenberg Wildlife Park to the north and the larger Sihlwald to the south
- Interactive map of Zürich Wilderness Park
- Nearest city: Zurich
- Coordinates: 47.26°N 8.55°E
- Website: www.wildnispark.ch

Zürich Wilderness Park (German: Wildnispark Zürich) is a wilderness park near the city of Zürich in Switzerland. It includes the Sihlwald forest, the largest mixed deciduous and coniferous forest in the Swiss Plateau (Swiss Mittelland), and the Langenberg Wildlife Park, the oldest Swiss wildlife park. Both sites are situated in the Sihl Valley to the south of Zürich, but are separated from each other by the town of Langnau am Albis.

== History ==
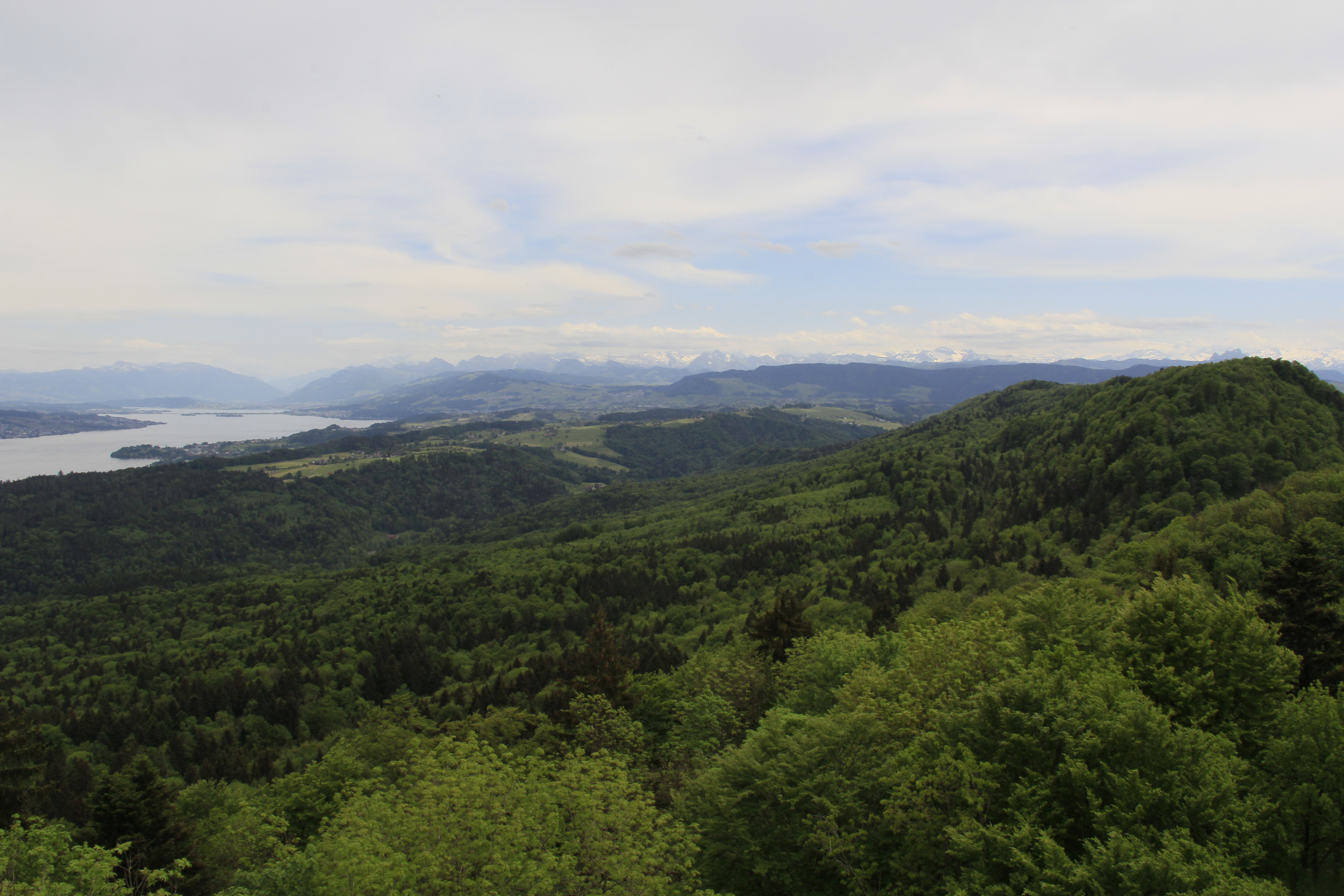
The Sihlwald

The city of Zürich received the Sihl forest, or Sihlwald, as a gift in 1309 from the Hapsburgers and again in 1524 through the dissolution of the Fraumünster convent. Over the following centuries, the forest provided Zürich with timber and firewood. However, the trees have not been felled since the 1990s; this is due to the actions of forest director Andreas Speich, in order to preserve the forest's unique composition.

In 1869, Langenberg Wildlife Park was founded by the city forester Carl Anton Ludwig von Orelli.

On August 28, 2009, the Federal Office for the Environment (FOEN) declared the Sihl forest a "regional nature park of national importance". The protection of Sihl forest was established through a forest reserve agreement in 2007 and a cantonal Protection Ordinance in 2008.

The Zürich Wilderness Park was formed in 2009, by the merger of the Langenberg Wildlife Park and the Sihlwald forest. Today, the park welcomes more than half a million yearly visitors, who are encouraged to barbecue, hike, cycle, and even ride horseback through the park, as well as visit its museum and attend various outdoor events.

== Sites ==
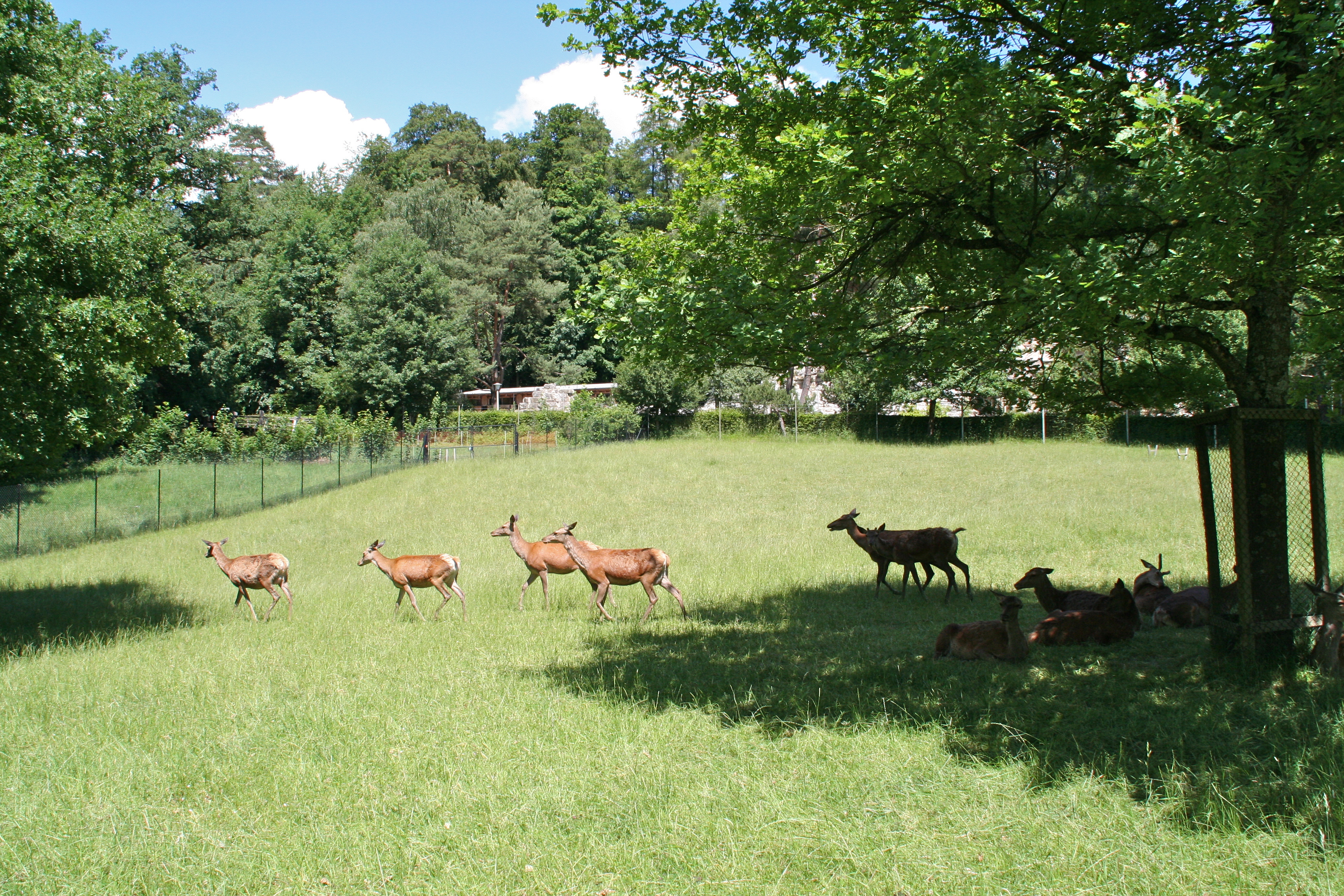
The Langenberg Wildlife Park

The Zürich Wilderness Park comprises two disconnected sites:

- The Langenberg Wildlife Park, a zoo situated in the municipality of Langnau am Albis some 12 km (7.5 mi) south of Zürich. Langenberg is home to a zoo with 16 native or formerly native animals such as bears, beavers, elk, hare, lynxes, wild boar, wolves, European bison and Przewalski’s horse.
- The Sihlwald forest, largely situated in the municipality of Horgen but also spreading into several adjoining municipalities. It is situated on both banks of the Sihl river, although mostly on the western slopes rising up to the Albis hills. The forest covers approximately 12 square kilometres (4.6 sq mi) and is between 14 km (8.7 mi) and 21 km (13 mi) south of Zürich. It is the only Swiss peri-urban nature reserve, and consists of mostly beech trees, some of which are up to 250 years old. The majority of the trees are about 120 years old.

Both sites can be reached via rail service S4 of the Zurich S-Bahn, using Wildpark-Höfli station for the Langenberg Wildlife Park and Sihlwald station for the Sihlwald forest.

== See also ==
- Nature parks in Switzerland
