= Rheintaler Höhenweg =

Hiking trail along the Rhine valley, Switzerland

The Rheintaler Höhenweg, lit. 'Rhine valley high path', is a hiking trail along the western side of the Alpine Rhine Valley in the cantons of Appenzell Ausserrhoden, Appenzell Innerrhoden and St. Gallen, Switzerland.

== Route ==
It starts in Rorschach (395 m [1,296 ft]) on the southern shore of Lake Constance (Bodensee), and follows the Alpine Rhine river southwards (upstream) through wine fields, fruit orchards and cheese-making countryside to finish in Sargans. The total route covers 110 km (68 mi), and reaches a maximum elevation of 1,440 metres (4,720 ft) above sea level.

The route can be split up into several stages, for example:

- From Rorschach to St. Margrethen
- St. Margrethen to Altstätten
- Altstätten to Sennwald
- Sennwald to Wildhaus
- Wildhaus to Malbun
- Malbun to Sargans

== See also ==
- Hiking in Switzerland
- Swiss hiking network
- Via Jacobi
