= Balfrin Höhenweg =

Hiking trail in Switzerland

Coordinates: 46.1352°N 7.8803°E

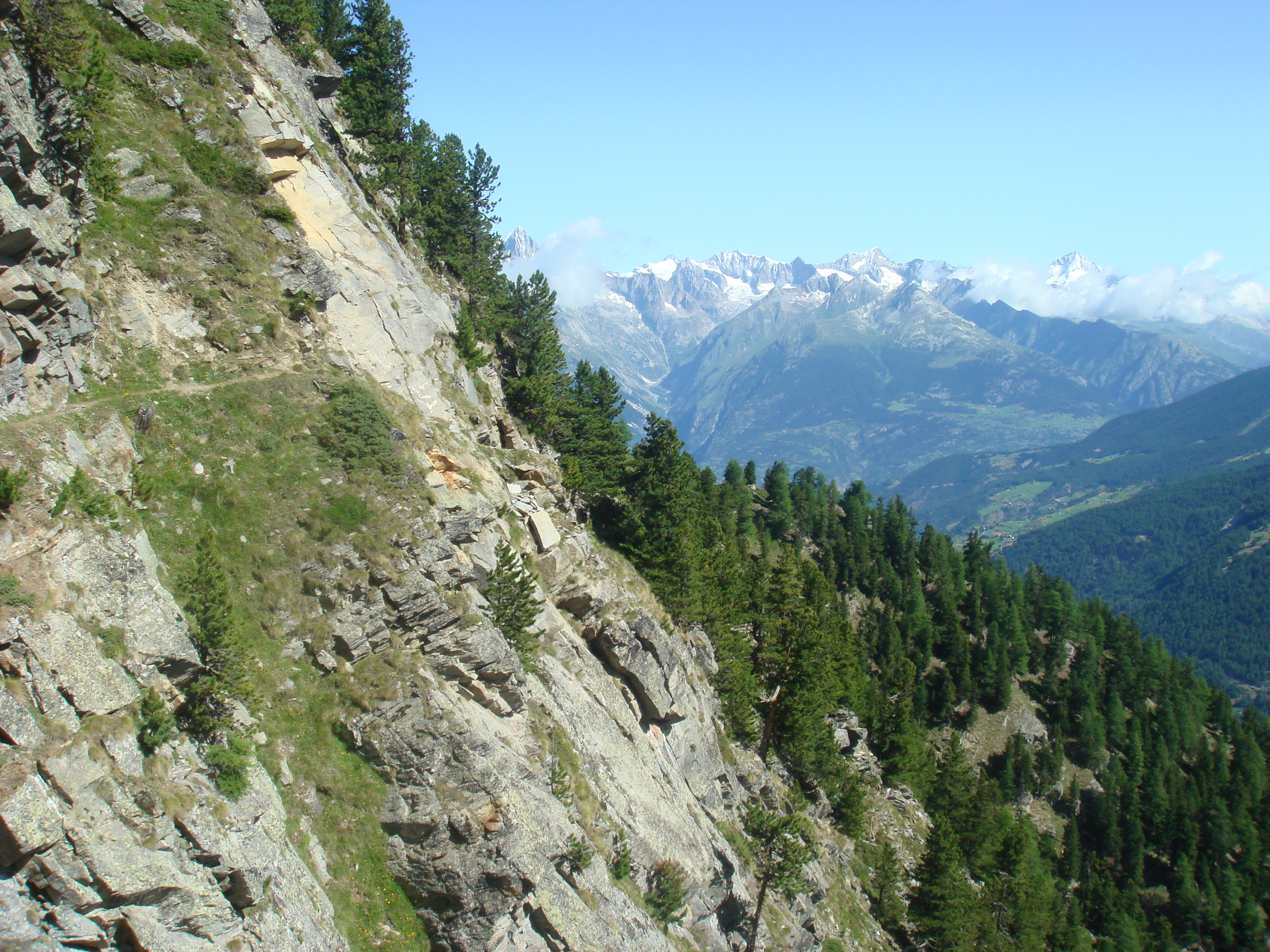
Höhenweg from near Grachen

The Balfrin Höhenweg is a high level footpath in Switzerland between Grächen and Saas-Fee and is part of the Monte Rosa tour. It is also known as Grächen–Saas Fee Höhenweg.

== See also ==
- Hiking in Switzerland
- Swiss hiking network
