= Swiss Path =

Hiking trail in central Switzerland

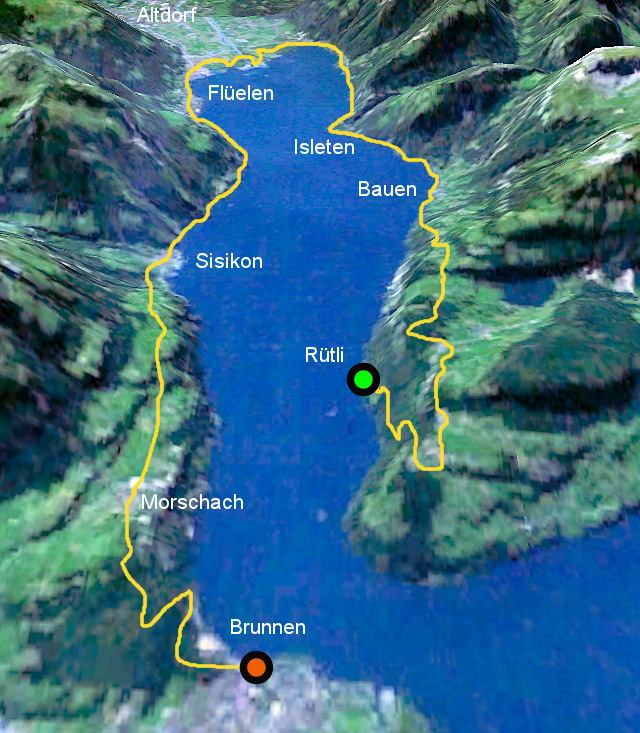
The Swiss Path. North is at bottom.

Swiss Path (German: Weg der Schweiz) is a 35-kilometre commemorative hiking trail in central Switzerland, created in 1991 to mark the 700th anniversary of the Federal Charter of 1291, also known as the Rütli Oath. The trail begins on the Rütli Meadow above Lake Uri, a southern arm of Lake Lucerne, traditionally regarded as the site where three peasant leaders swore a mutual defence pact that laid the foundation for the Swiss Confederation.

All 26 Swiss cantons are represented along the trail, with each canton allotted a section length proportional to its population in 1991, at a ratio of five millimetres per resident. The cantons appear in the order in which they joined the confederation. Between 400,000 and 500,000 people walked at least part of the trail during its inaugural year, and it has attracted about 300,000 visitors annually since.

== Route ==
The Swiss Path begins at the Rütli Meadow, above Lake Uri, where according to tradition, the founding oath of the Swiss Confederation was taken in 1291. From there, the path follows the eastern shoreline of Lake Uri and circles back to Brunnen, covering approximately 35 kilometres (22 mi) in total. The trail is typically divided into four main stages:

- Stage 1: Rütli to Bauen – 9 km (5.6 mi)
- Stage 2: Bauen to Flüelen – 10 km (6.2 mi)
- Stage 3: Flüelen to Sisikon – 7 km (4.3 mi)
- Stage 4: Sisikon to Brunnen – 8 km (5.0 mi)

The path alternates between lakeside and elevated segments, including sections carved into cliffs and others along gentle slopes, with panoramic views of the lake and surrounding Alps. Passenger boats operating on Lake Lucerne and railway station along the eastern lake shore (Sisikon, Flüelen) allow hikers to join or exit the trail at multiple points. Key landmarks along the route include the Tellskapelle (William Tell Chapel) near Sisikon and interpretive signage representing each of Switzerland's 26 cantons.

== See also ==
- Hiking in Switzerland
- Swiss hiking network
- Swiss Alpine Club
