= Tourism in Switzerland =

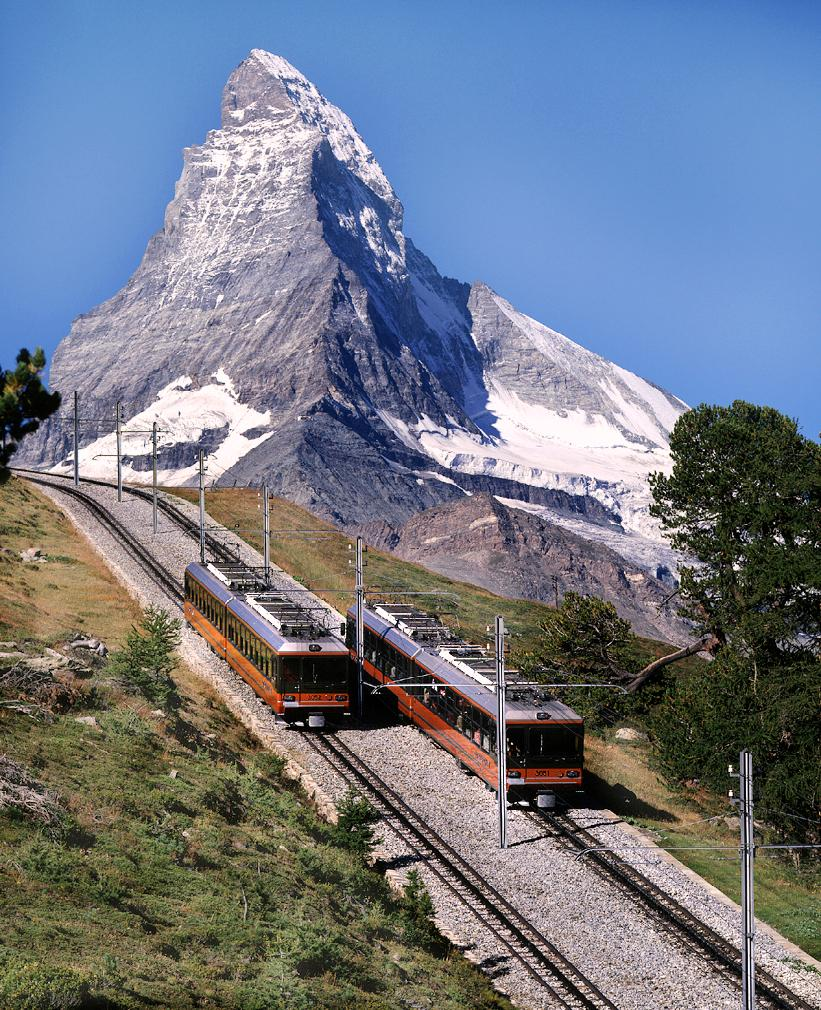
Switzerland is notable for its landscapes and tourism facilities (Matterhorn from the Gornergrat Railway).

Tourists are drawn to Switzerland's diverse landscape as well as the available activities, which take advantage of the Alpine climate and landscapes, in particular skiing and mountaineering, but also due to the many old town centers, with their historic buildings that often preserve parts of their medieval fortifications, and Roman sites. Switzerland is also popular for tourism-oriented railways, as well as for its cheese and chocolate. Tourist activities are rated by the Quality Label for Swiss Tourism.

As of 2016, tourism accounted for an estimated 2.6% (CHF 16.8 billion) of Switzerland's GDP, compared to 2.6% (CHF 12.8 billion) in 2001.

== History ==
Tourism began in Switzerland with British mountaineers climbing the main peaks of the Bernese Alps in the early 19th century.

The Alpine Club in London was founded in 1857. Reconvalescence in the Alpine, in particular from tuberculosis, was another important branch of tourism in the 19th and early 20th centuries: for example in Davos, Graubünden. Due to the prominence of the Bernese Alps in British mountaineering, the Bernese Oberland was long especially known as a tourist destination. Meiringen's Reichenbach Falls achieved literary fame as the site of the fictional death of Sir Arthur Conan Doyle's Sherlock Holmes (1893). The first organised tourist holidays to Switzerland were offered during the 19th century by Thomas Cook and Lunn Travel companies. Tourism in Switzerland had been exclusively for the rich until it became widely popular in the 20th century.

== Notable tourist destinations in Switzerland ==
Infographic map of Switzerland

Large cities

- Basel
- Bern
- Geneva
- Lausanne
- Lucerne
- Zurich

Smaller cities

- Biel/Bienne
- Chur
- Fribourg
- Interlaken
- La Chaux-de-Fonds
- Lugano
- Montreux
- Neuchâtel
- Rapperswil
- Schaffhausen
- Sion
- Solothurn
- St. Gallen
- Thun
- Zug

Small towns and villages

- Arbon
- Ascona
- Baden
- Bremgarten
- Gruyères
- Delémont
- Kaiseraugst
- Le Locle
- Morcote
- Murten
- Quinten (Note: Car-free village)
- Regensberg
- Rheinau
- Romont
- Stein am Rhein

Resorts in the Alps

Bernese Oberland	Central Switzerland	Eastern Switzerland	Grisons	Valais	Vaud	Ticino
Adelboden; Grindelwald; Gstaad; Kandersteg; Lauterbrunnen (Note: Municipality/Region includes car-free village(s)); Lenk	Andermatt; Brunni; Einsiedeln; Engelberg; Hoch-Ybrig; Melchsee-Frutt; Rigi Kaltbad; Sörenberg; Stoos	Appenzell; Braunwald; Flumserberg; Heiden; Wildhaus	Arosa; Calanca; Davos; Flims; Klosters; Samnaun; Scuol; St. Moritz	Aletsch Glacier; Belalp; Crans-Montana; Gspon; Leukerbad; Rosswald; Saas-Fee; Verbier; Zermatt (Note: Limited car traffic)	Les Diablerets; Leysin; Veysonnaz; Villars-sur-Ollon	Airolo; Val Bavona; Verzasca

Natural regions

- Bernese Alps (notably Eiger, Mönch and Jungfrau), with glaciers (notably the Aletsch Glacier), deep valleys (e.g. Aare Gorge, Lauterbrunnental), waterfalls (e.g. Mürrenbach Falls, Staubbach Falls), lakes (e.g. Oeschinen Lake) and caves
- Valais Alps and Chablais Alps (on the left side of the Rhone valley), contain the highest mountains of the Alps (notably Monte Rosa and the Matterhorn on the border with Italy), ski resorts like Zermatt, and a waterfall in a cave
- Gotthard Massif, with the Gotthard Pass at its heart, notable for the historic Gotthard routes (north–south axis), the Matterhorn Gotthard railway (west–east axis) and the many other high road passes (Nufenen, Grimsel, Furka, Susten, Klausen, Oberalp and Lukmanier)
- Grison Alps, with the Engadin Valley or Lake Cauma
- Eastern Switzerland, with Alpstein (Mount Säntis, Ebenalp, Seealpsee) and Churfirsten mountain ranges, Tamina Gorge, Lake Constance, the second largest lake in the country (bordering Austria and Germany) and Lake Walen
- Lake Lucerne, the largest lake in central Switzerland, notable for the many mountain railways in the surrounding mountains, notably the Rigi and Pilatus Railway
- Lake Geneva, the largest lake in the country, notable for the Riviera and the many vineyards
- Seeland, the region of Lake Neuchâtel, Lake Biel and Lake Morat
- Jura Mountains and Table Jura, a moderately elevated mountainous region north of the Swiss Plateau (e.g. Chasseral, Creux du Van, Lägern, Randen)
- Rhine (Alpine Rhine, High Rhine), the largest river in the country, is notable for the Rhine Falls and Ruinaulta
- Italian Lakes, a group of lakes on the Italian border (lakes Maggiore and Lugano), notable for being the warmest place in the country
Emblematic sights
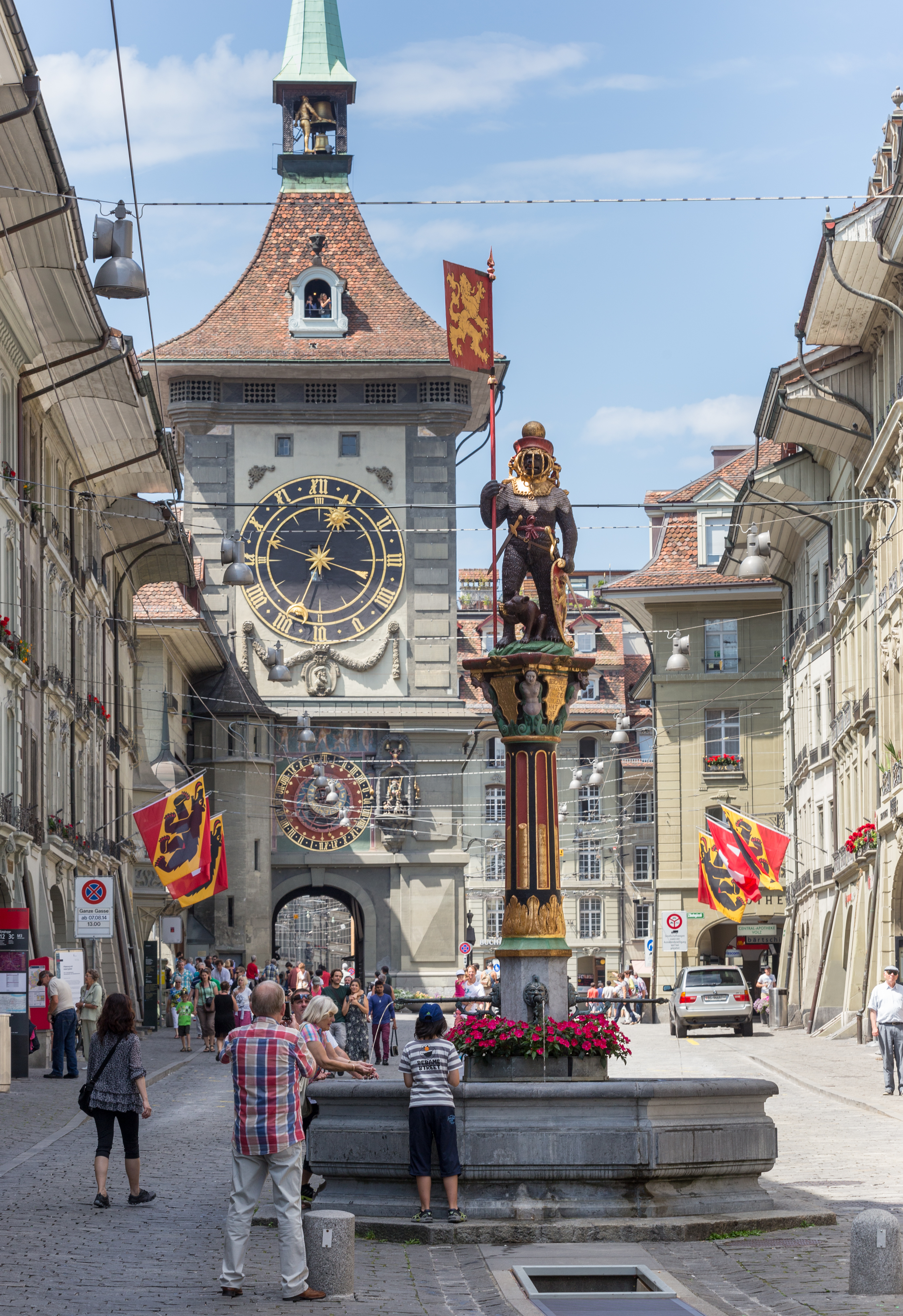
Bern Old City with the Zytglogge

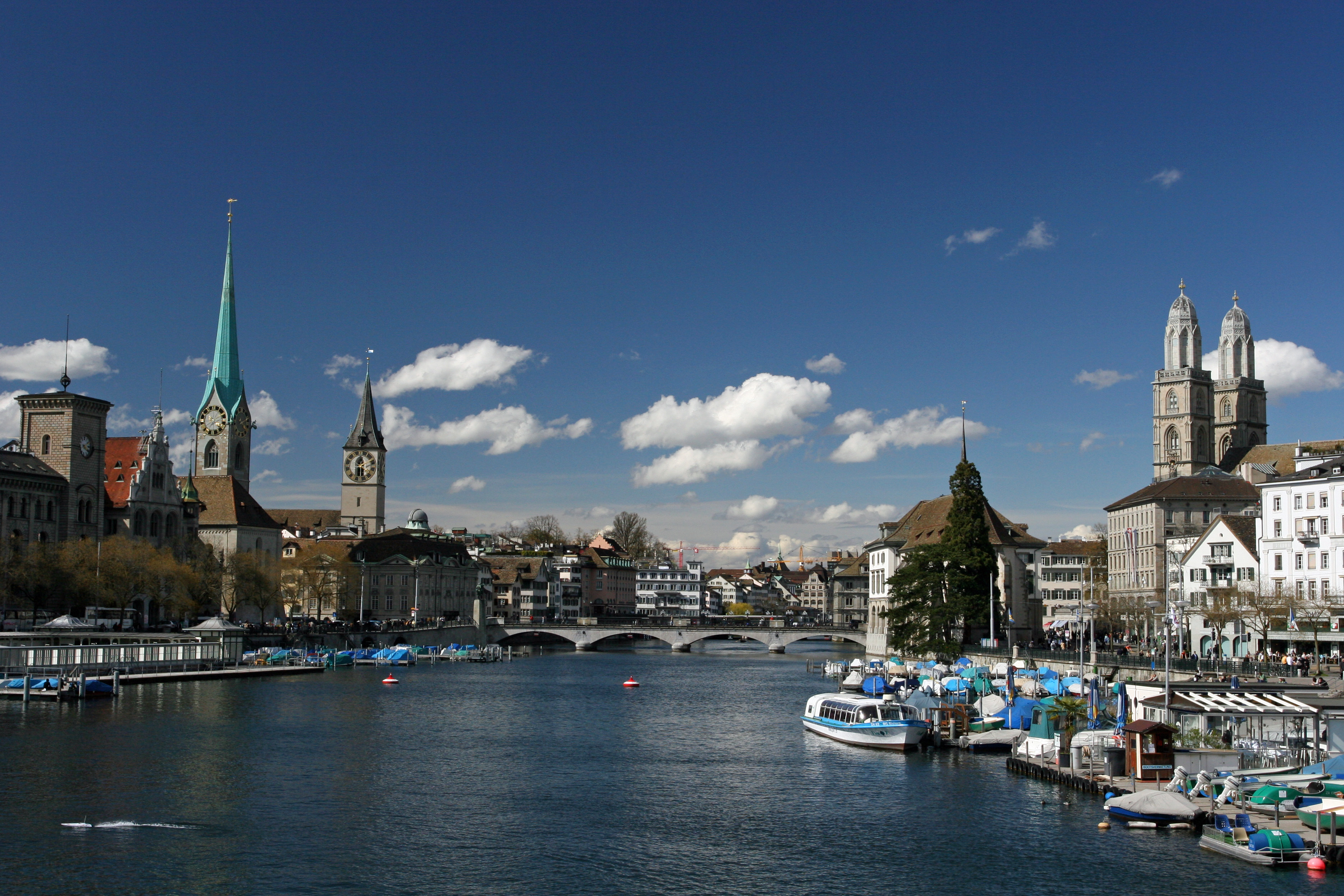
Limmat in Zürich

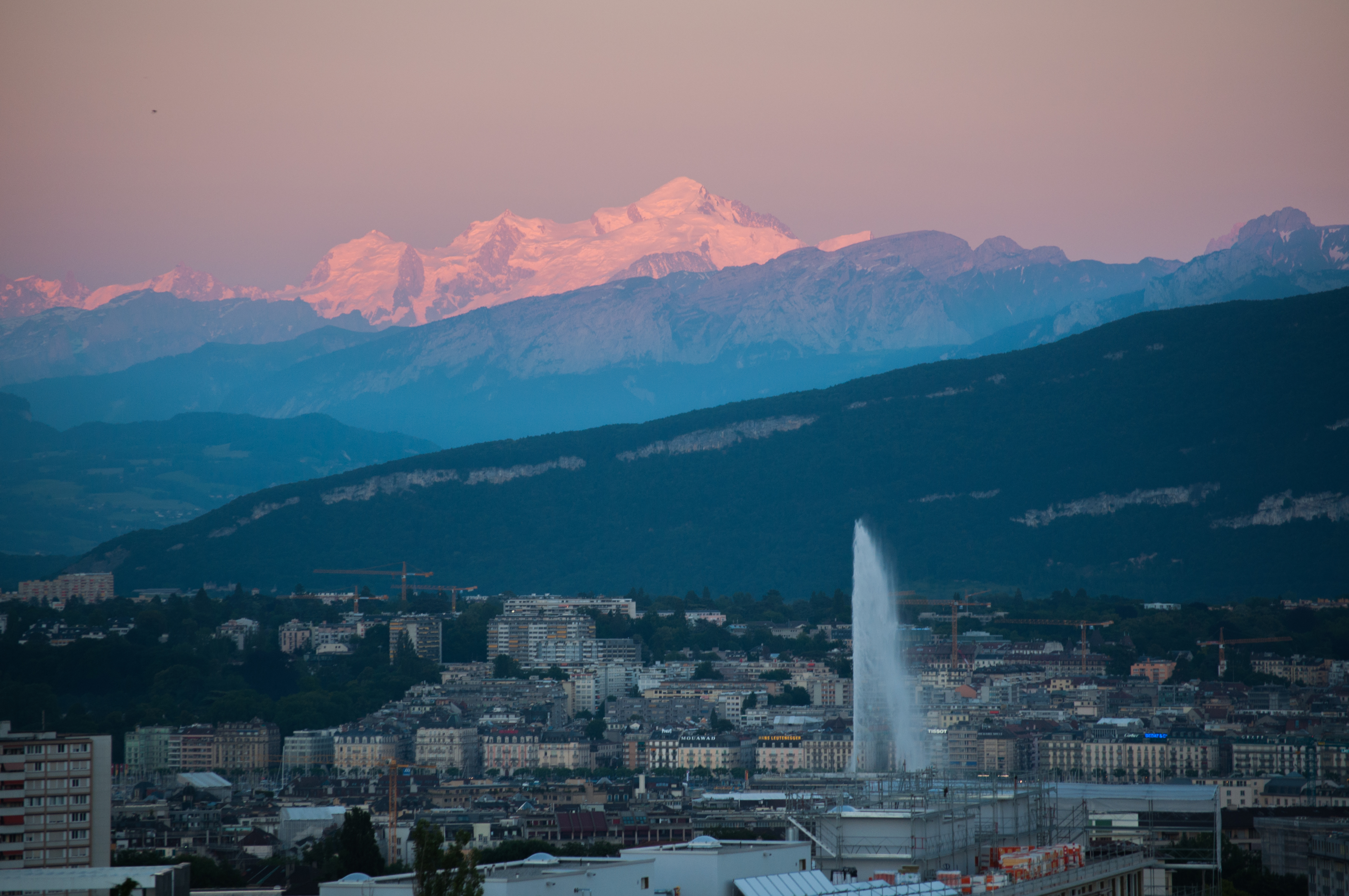
Geneva Jet d'Eau with Mont Blanc

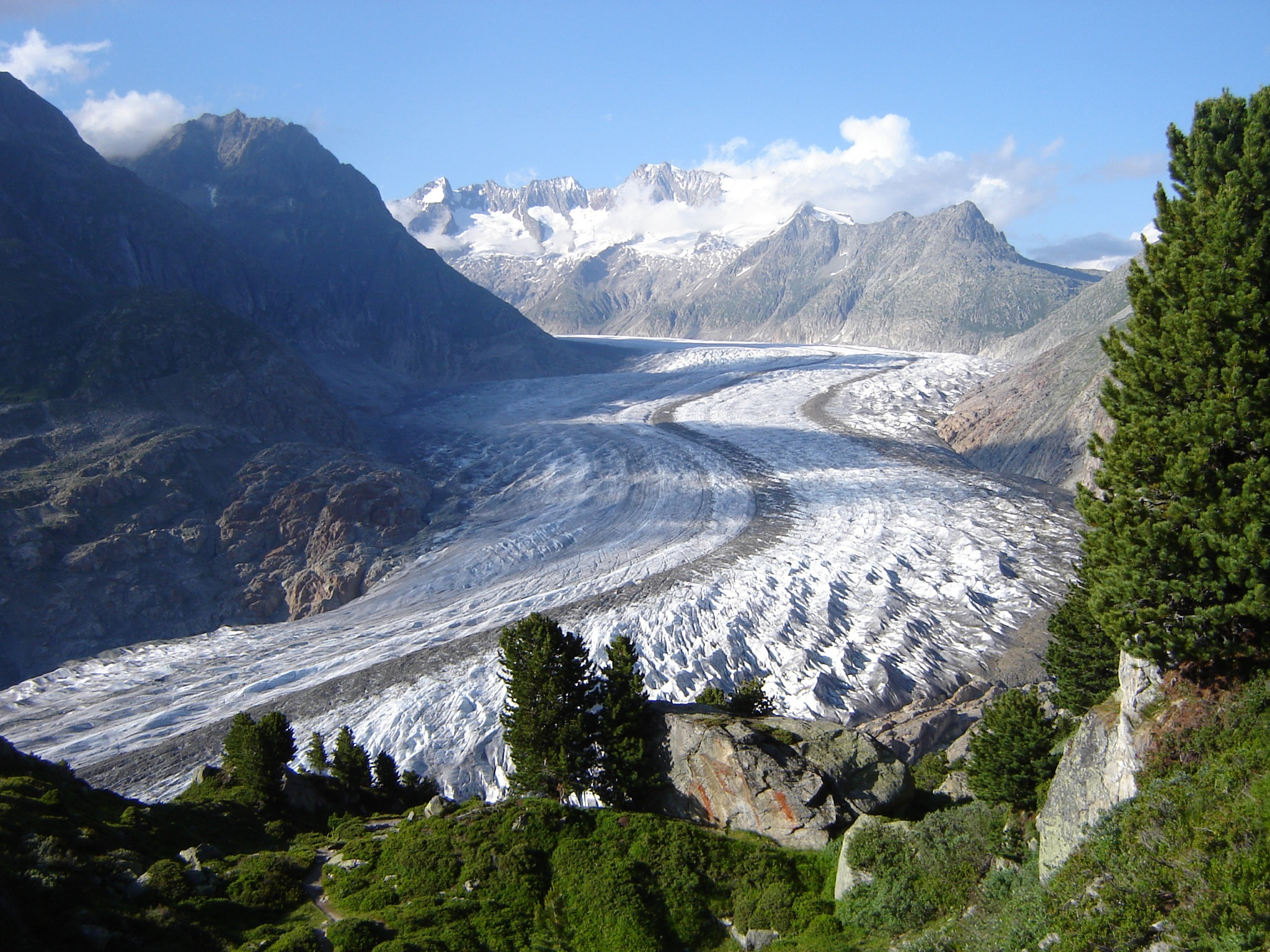
Aletsch Glacier with Aletsch Forest

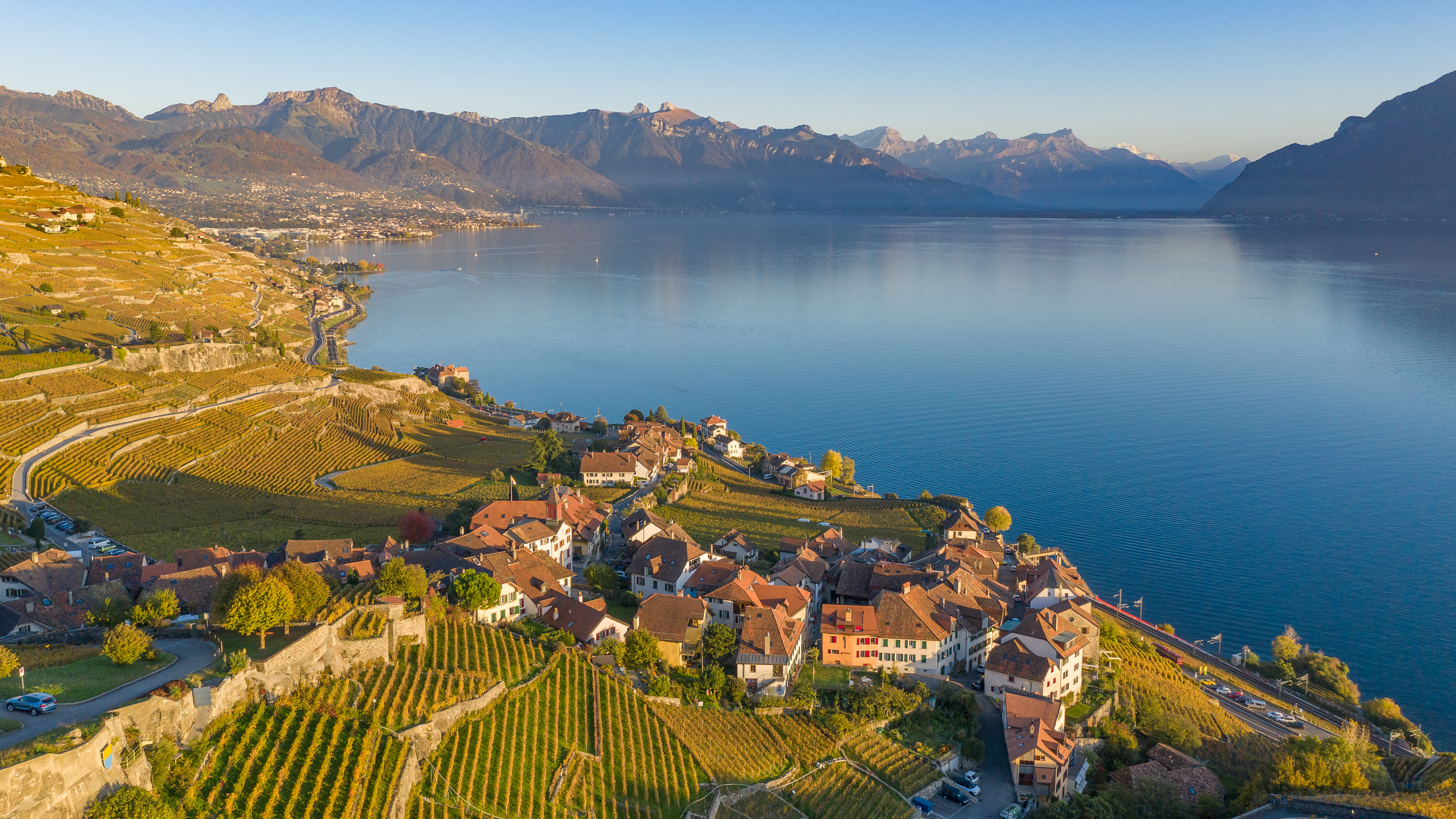
Lake Geneva with the Lavaux vineyards

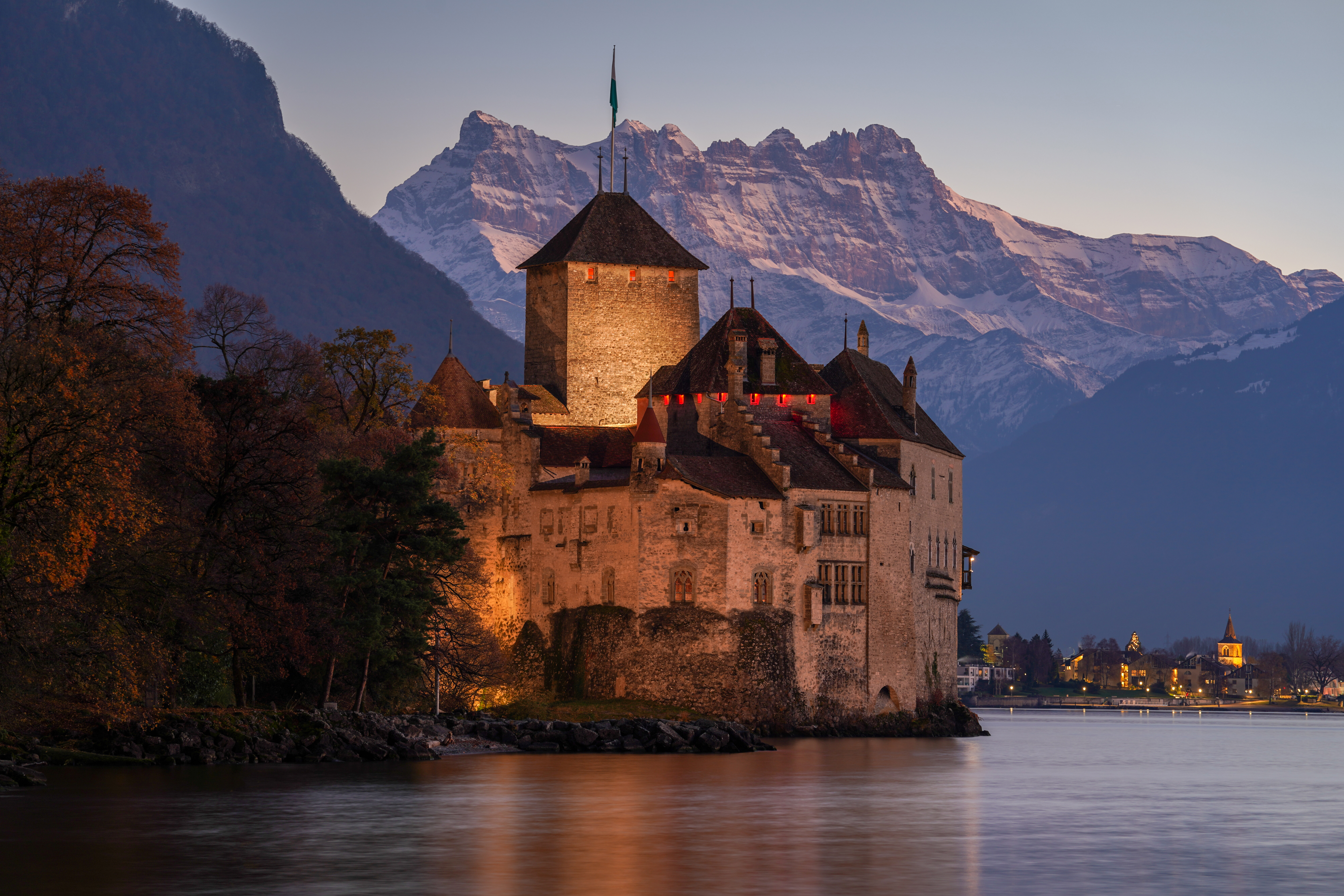
Chillon Castle with the Dents du Midi

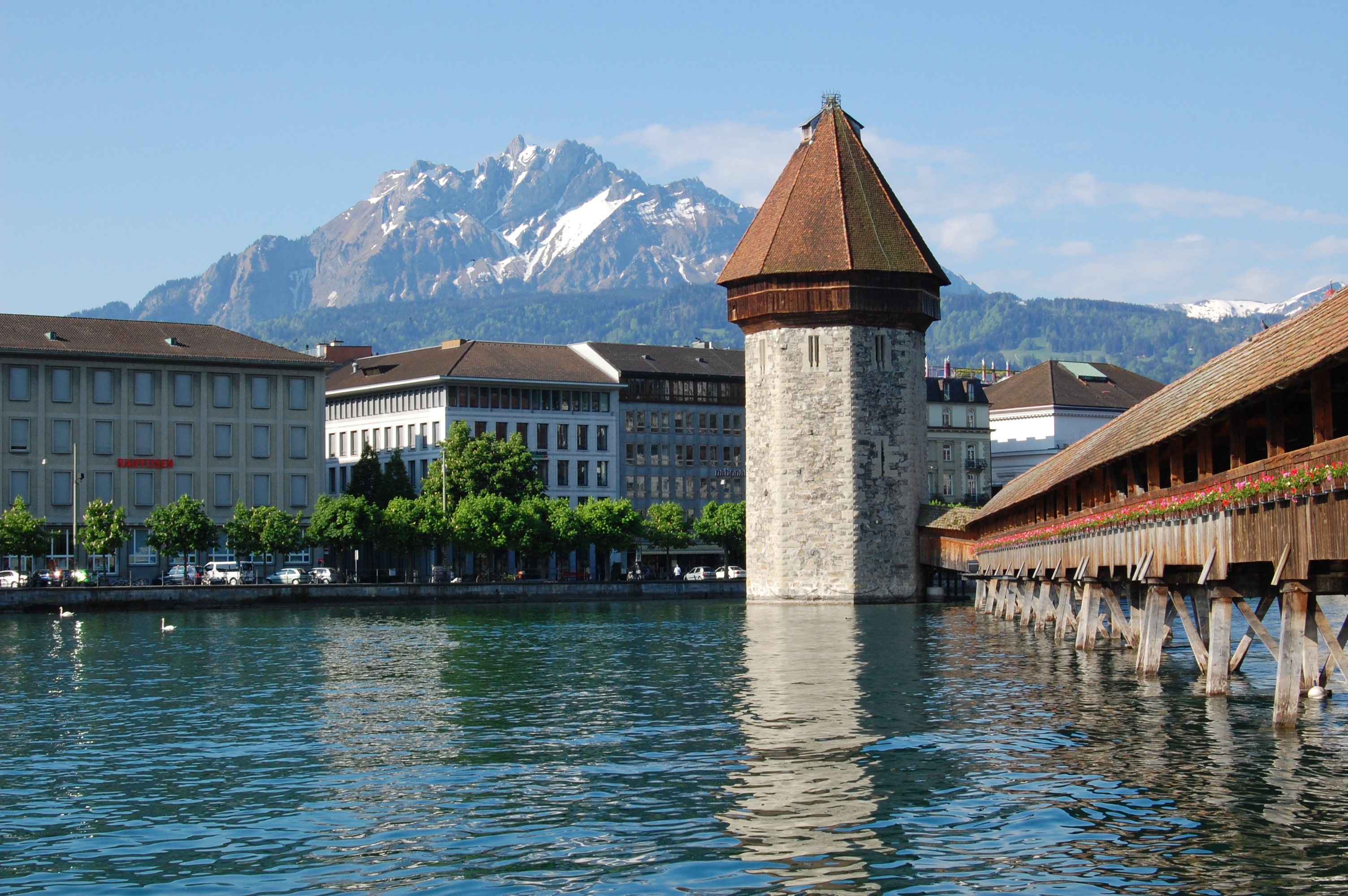
Kapellbrücke with Mount Pilatus

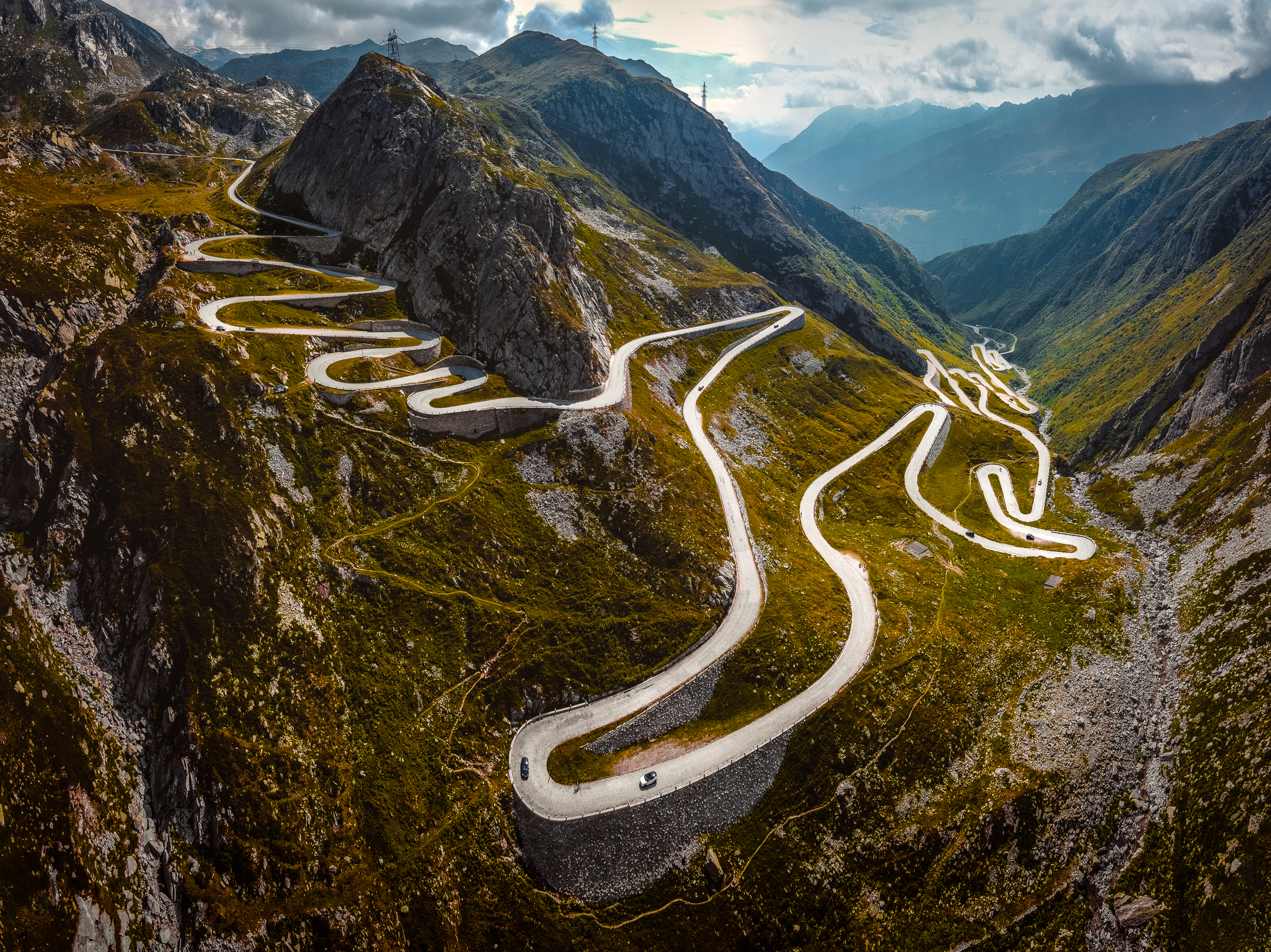
Tremola road of the Gotthard Pass

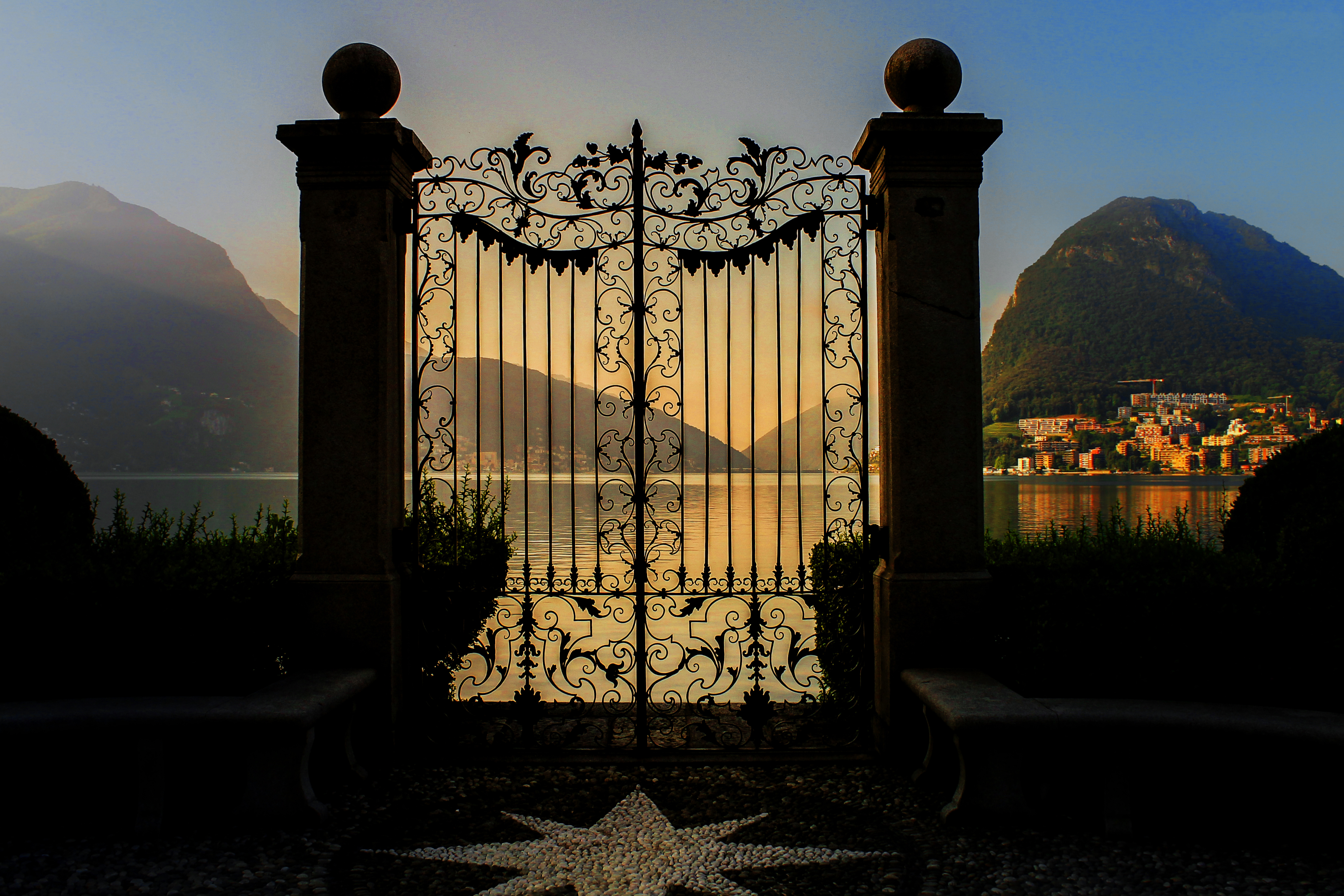
Lake Lugano from Parco Ciani

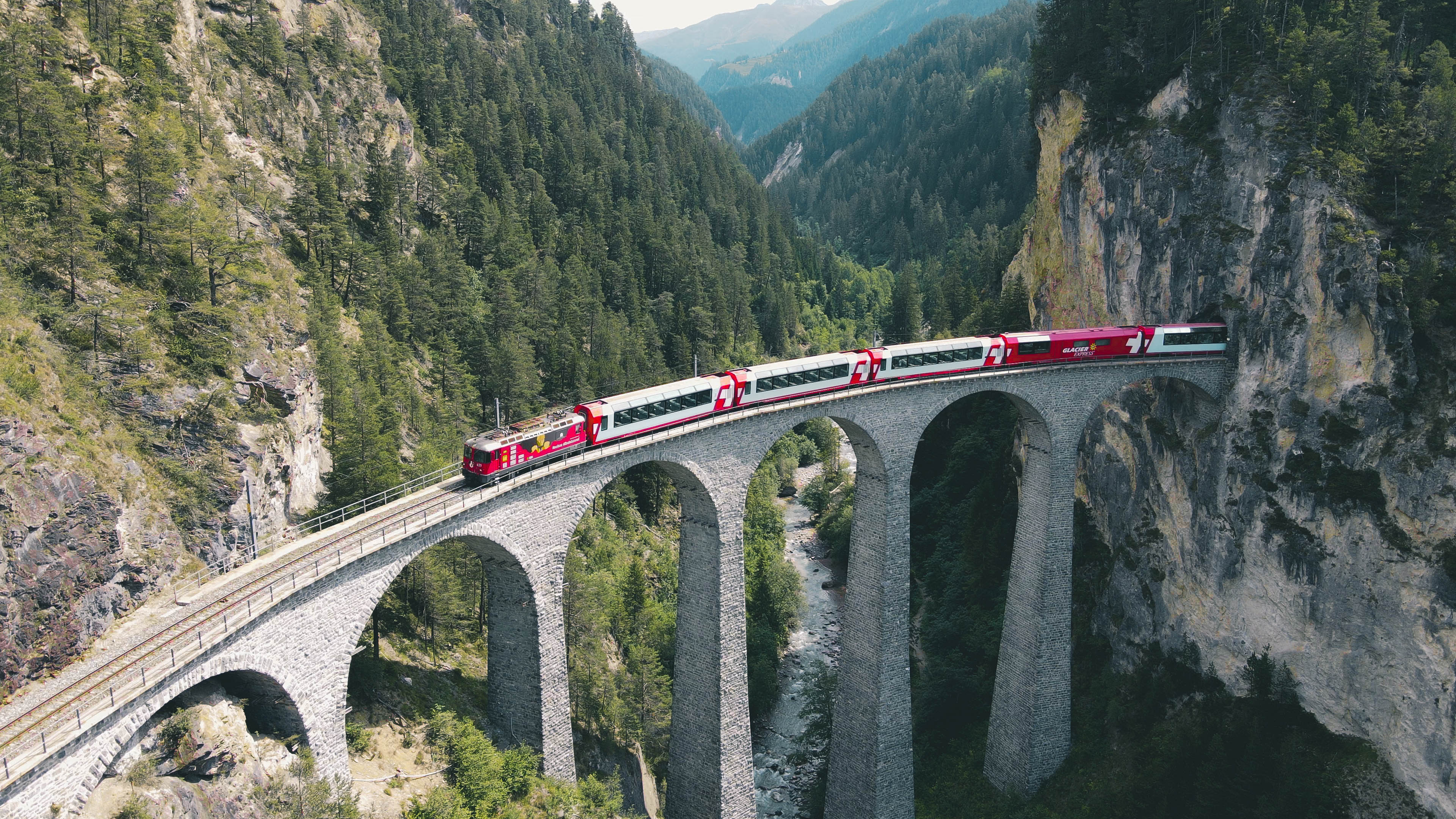
Landwasser Viaduct with Glacier Express

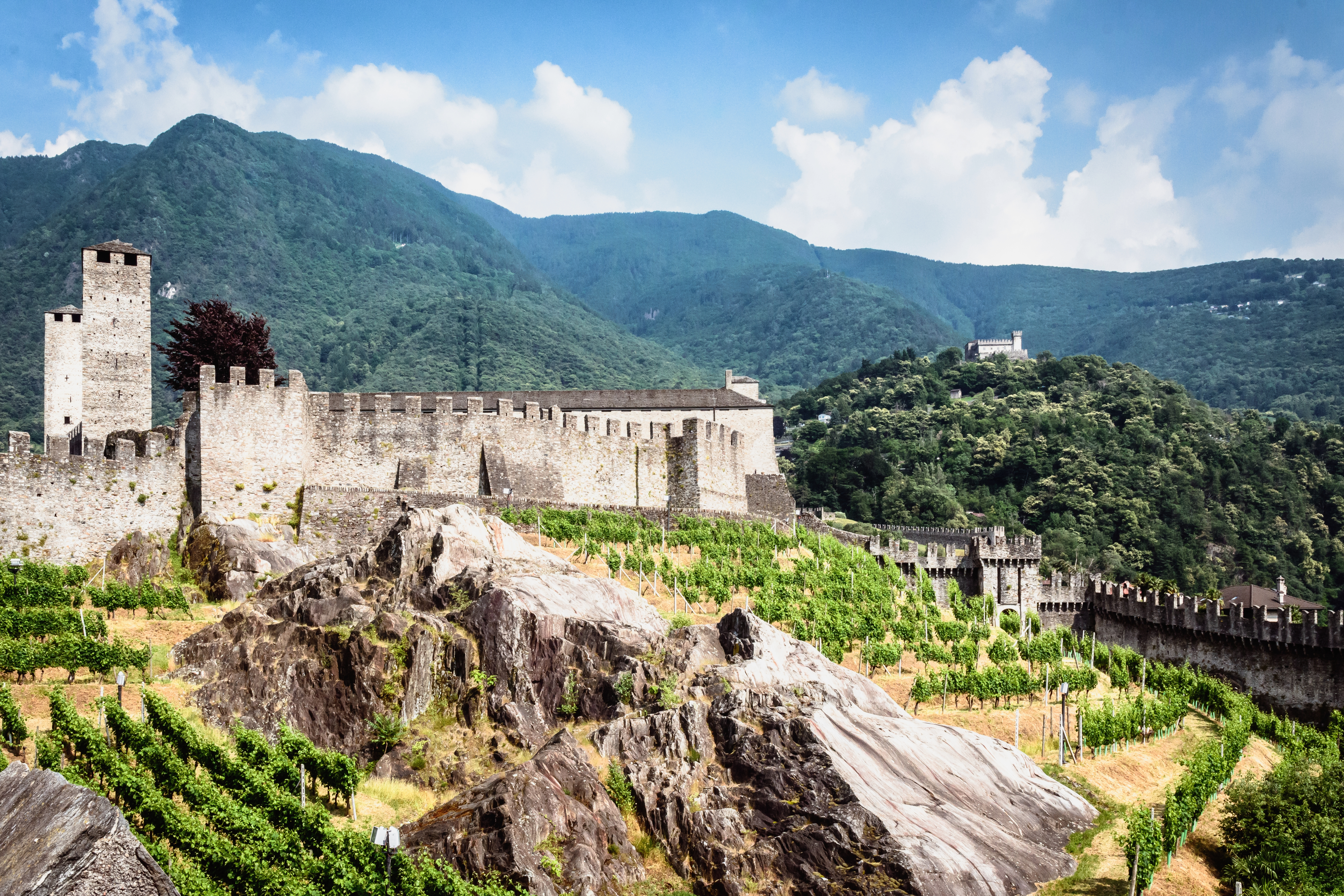
Bellinzona Castles

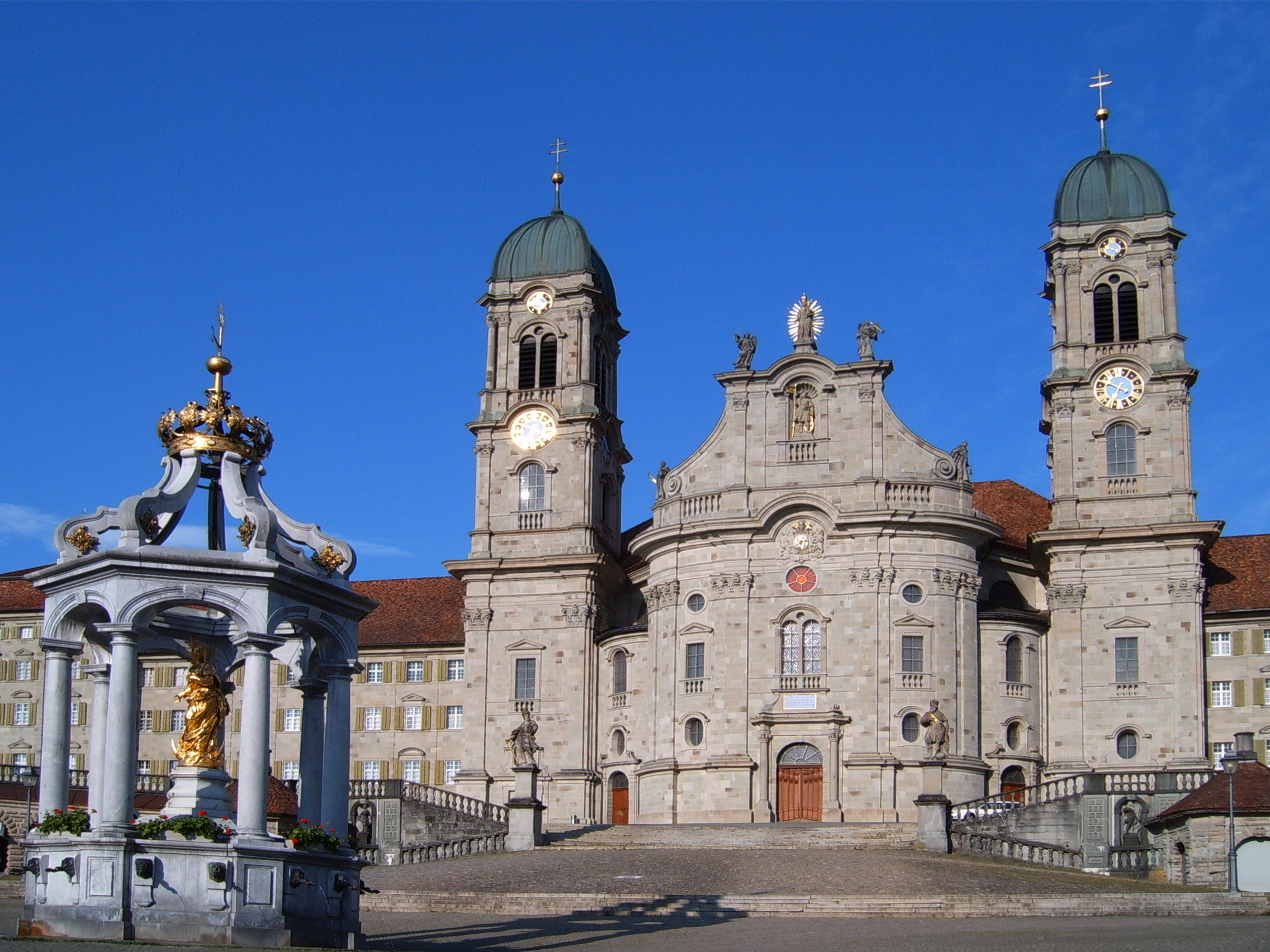
Einsiedeln Abbey

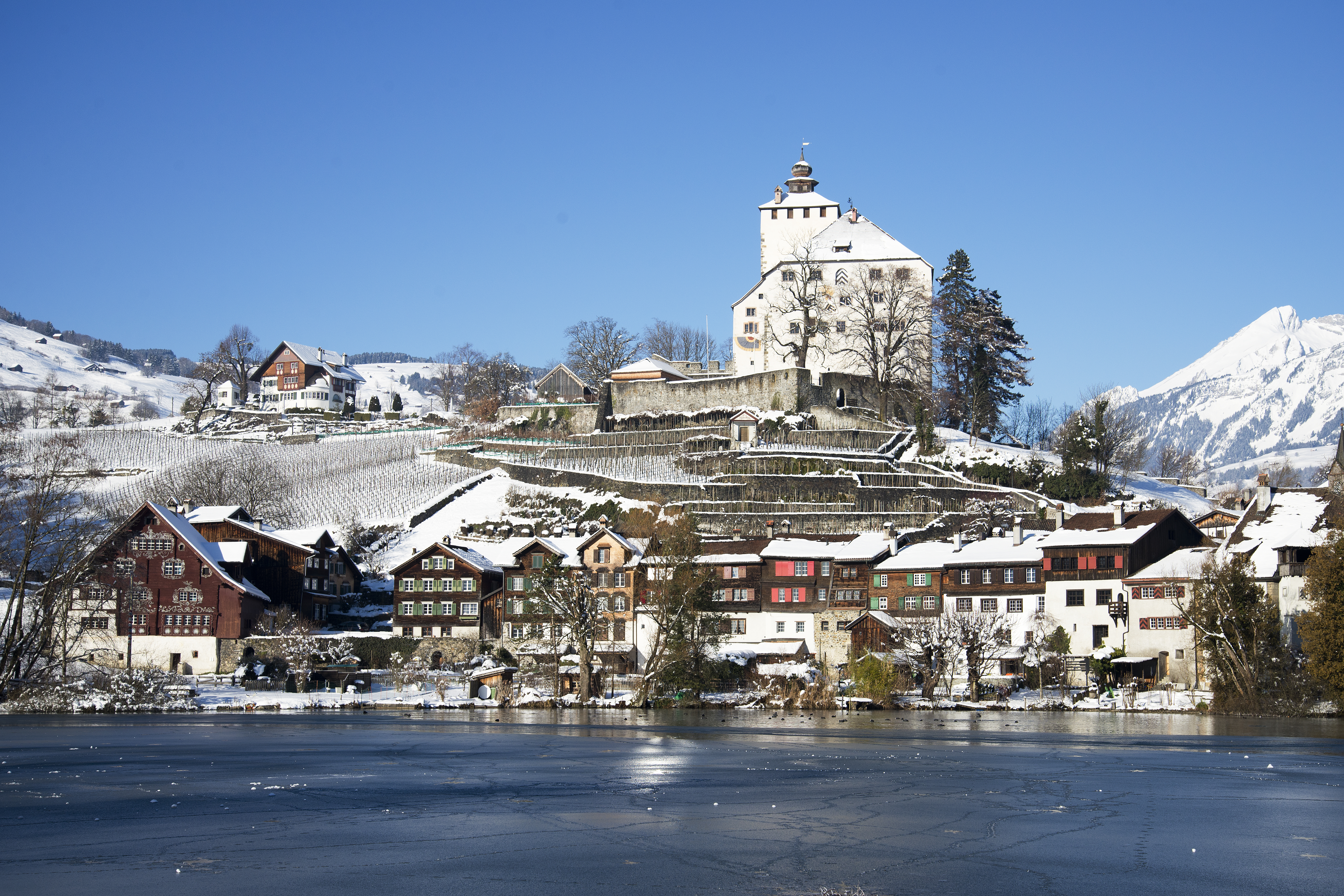
Werdenberg with Castle

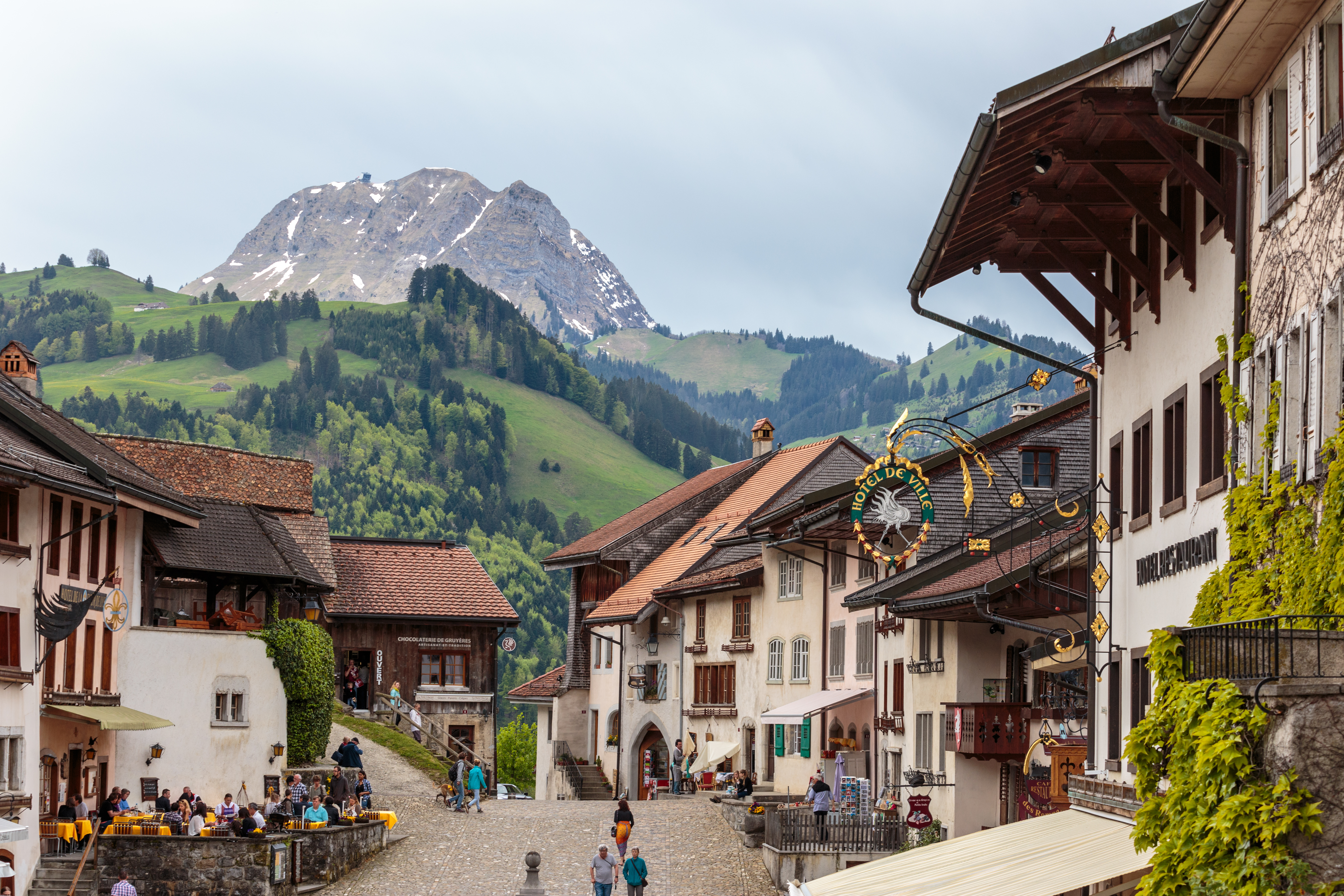
Gruyères with Castle

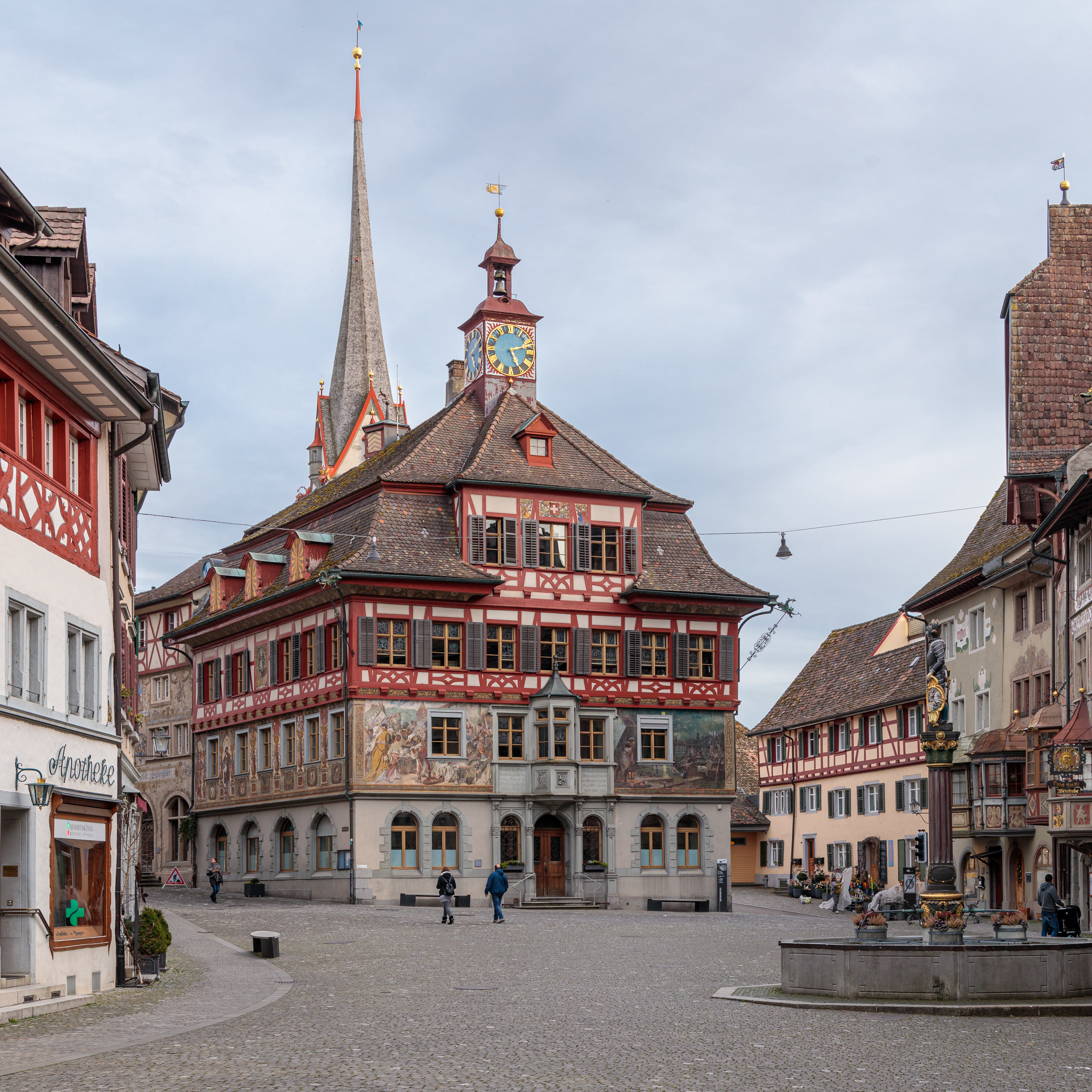
Stein am Rhein

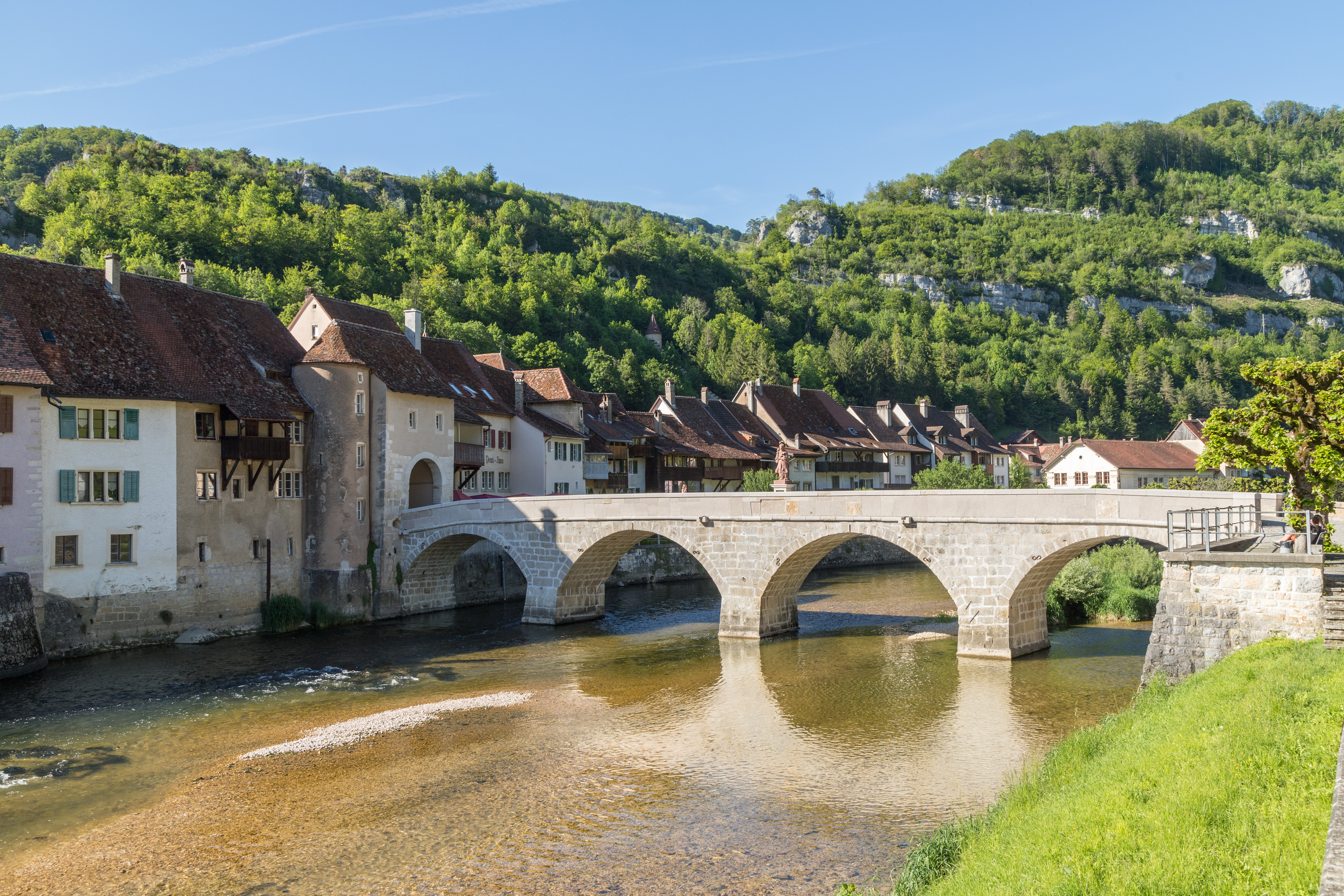
St-Ursanne

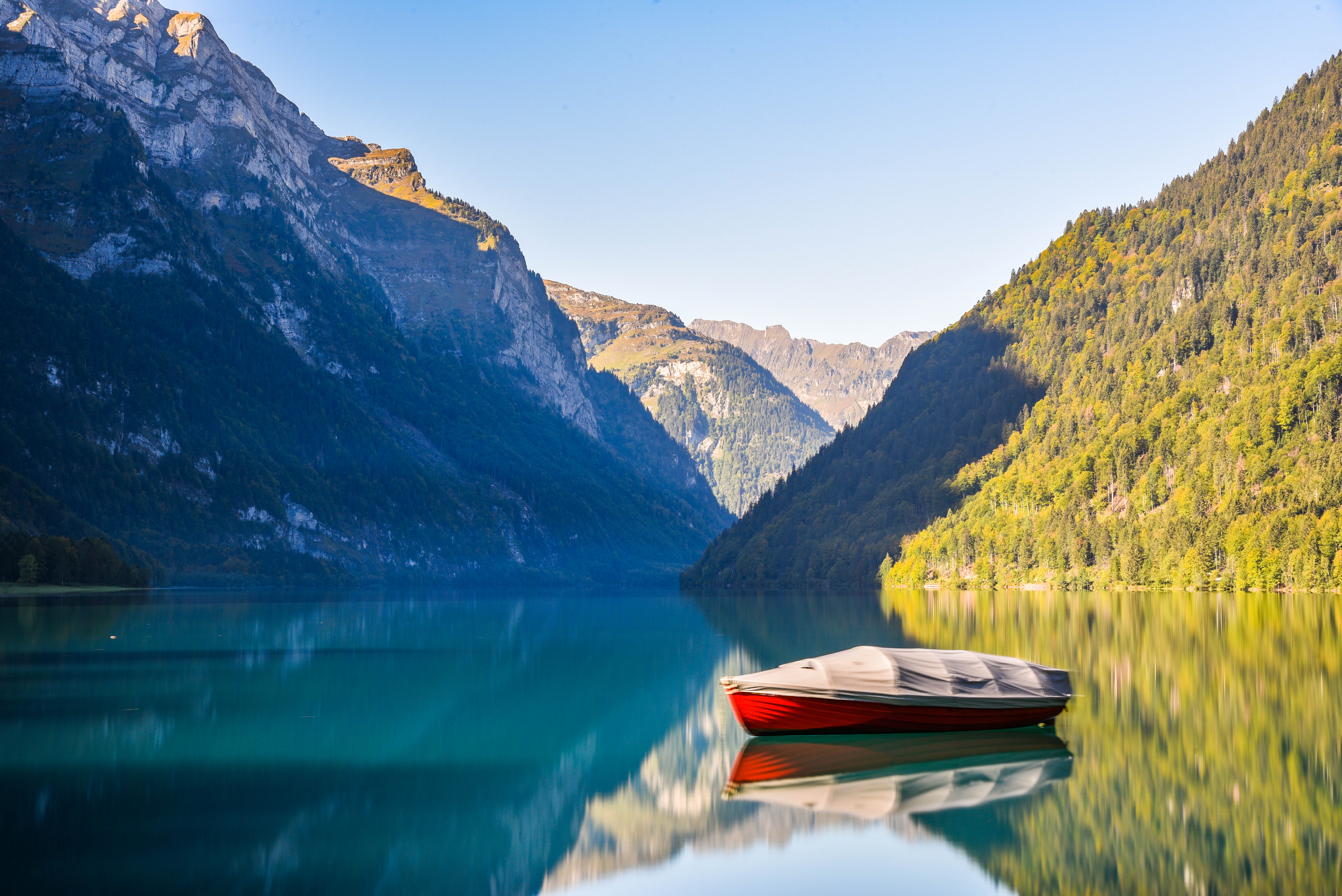
Klöntalersee

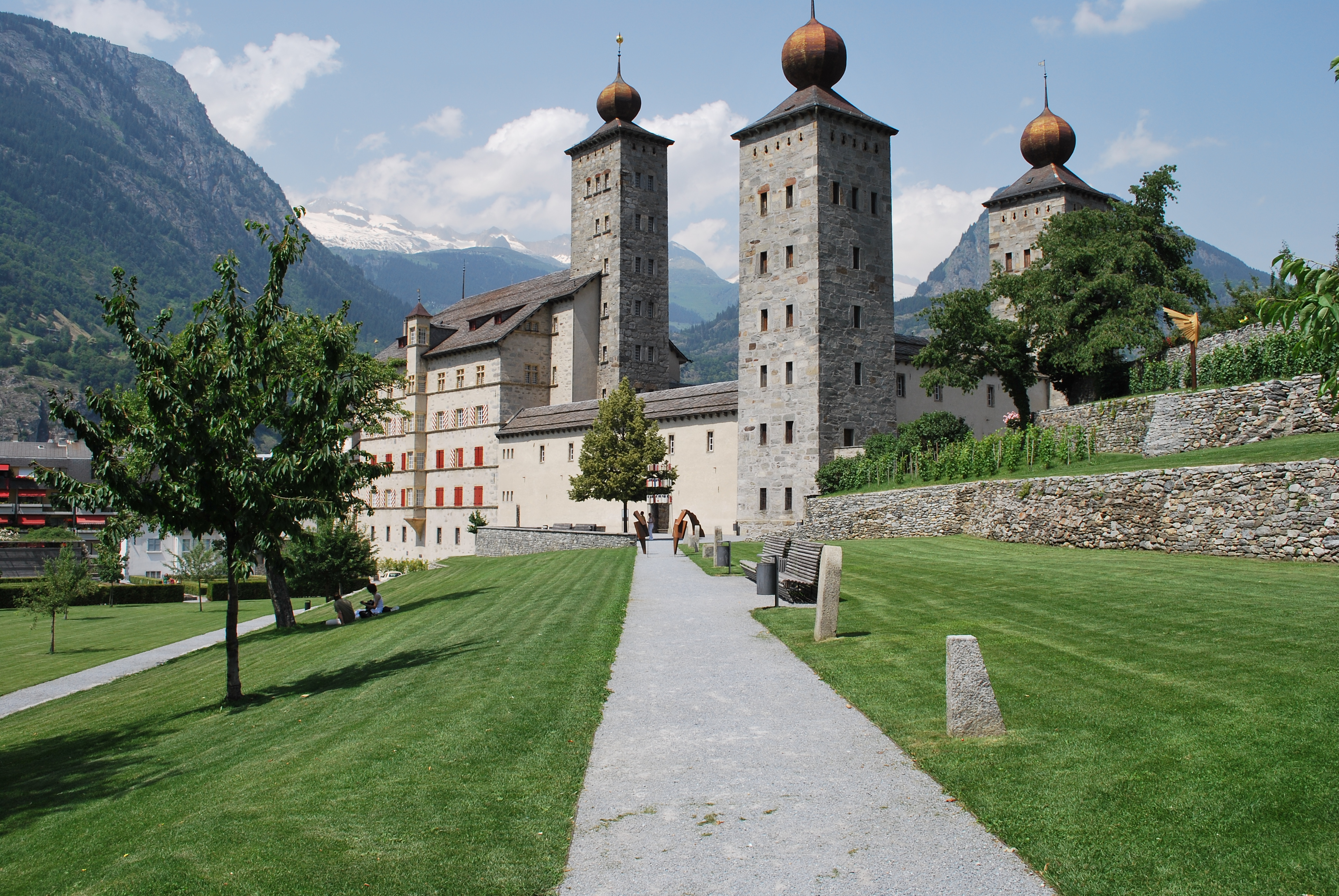
Stockalper Palace

== Activities ==
=== Boating ===
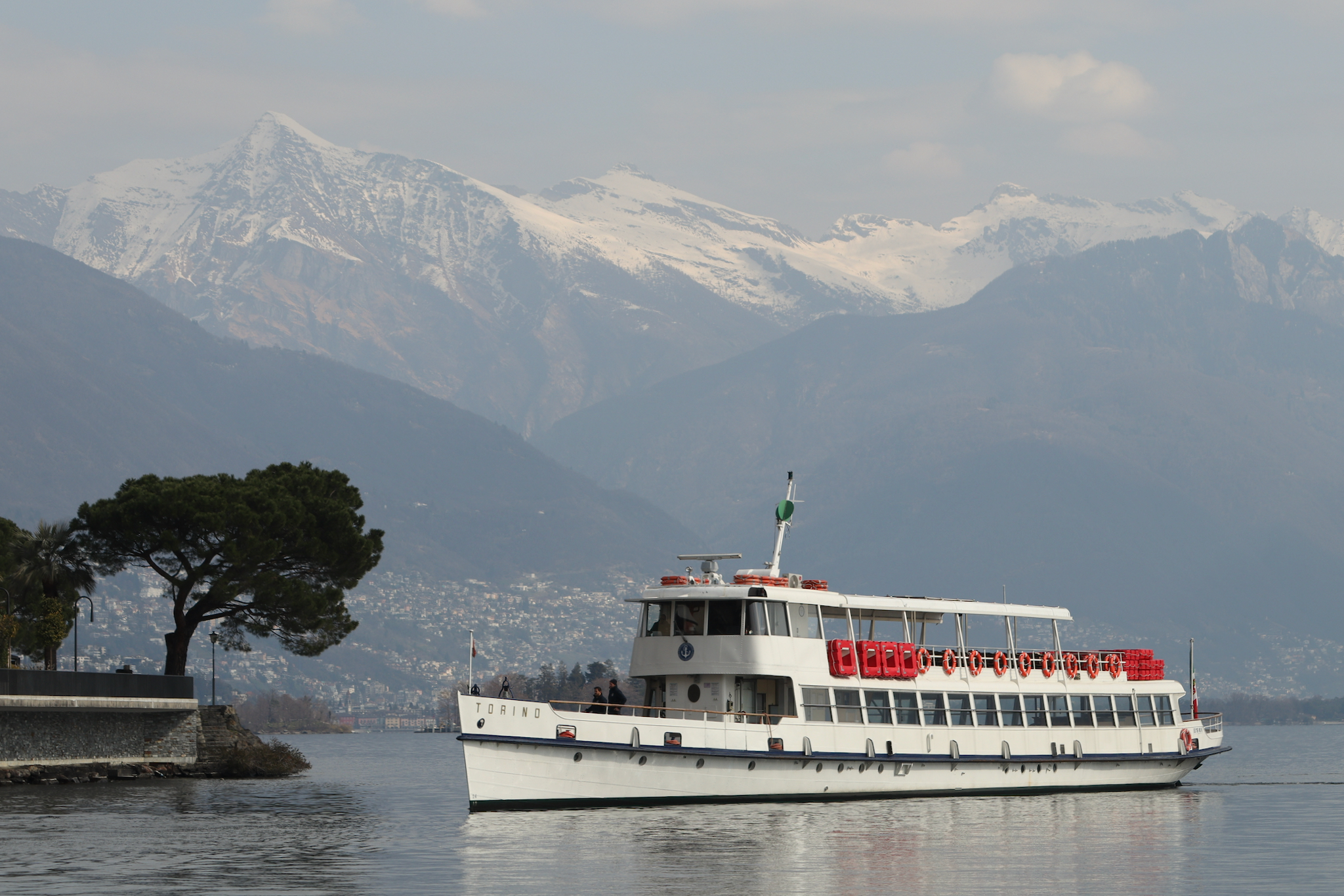
Ship of Navigazione Laghi arriving at San Pancrazio island

The following navigation companies offer tourism-oriented boat services on Swiss lakes and rivers:

- Compagnie Générale de Navigation sur le lac Léman on Lake Geneva (Lac Léman)
- Zürichsee-Schifffahrtsgesellschaft on Lake Zurich (Zürichsee) and the Limmat
- Lake Lucerne Navigation Company on Lake Lucerne (Vierwaldstättersee)
- Schiffsbetrieb Walensee on Lake Walen (Walensee)
- Schweizerische Schifffahrtsgesellschaft Untersee und Rhein on Lower Lake Constance (Untersee) and the High Rhine
- Società Navigazione del Lago di Lugano on Lake Lugano (Lago di Lugano / Lago di Ceresio)
- Gestione Governativa Navigazione Laghi on Lake Maggiore (Lago Maggiore)

=== Cycling ===
Cycling is popular in Switzerland, both for commuting and as a recreational activity. The country has an extensive network of national, regional and local cycling routes, along with designated mountain bike trails.

=== Events ===
- Alpabzug/Désalpes
- Art Basel
- Art Zurich
- Basel Tattoo
- Carnival of Basel
- Locarno Film Festival
- Lucerne Festival
- Montreux Jazz Festival
- Paléo Festival
- National Day
- Schwingen
- Sechseläuten
- Solothurn Film Festival
- Street Parade
- Zibelemärit
- Zurich Film Festival

=== Hiking ===
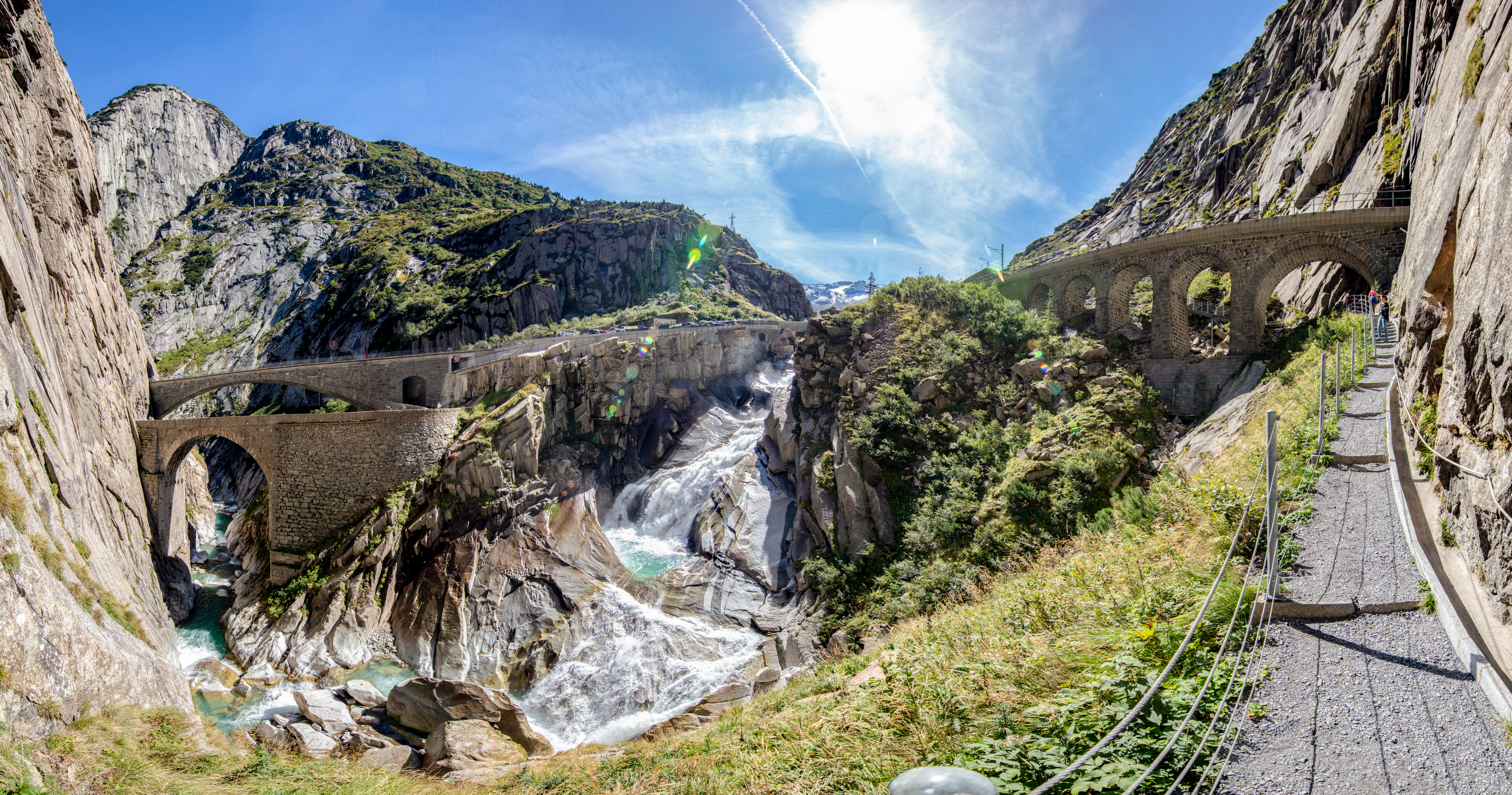
Switzerland comprehends an extensive hiking trail network (here the Schöllenen Gorge on the Gotthard route)

Hiking is one of the main sports activities in Switzerland and is often referred to as the "national sport". About one-third of the population practice hiking regularly, with a total of 520,000,000 kilometres (320,000,000 mi) in 130 million hours being travelled every year by the Swiss. Along with cycling, walking, in general, is the preferred form of mobility, regardless of social origins. The total hiking trail network is about 65,000 km (40,000 mi). Hiking trails in Switzerland offer a wide range of difficulty levels, catering to both casual walkers and experienced mountaineers, with many routes featuring breathtaking views of the Alps and pristine natural landscapes. Examples are:

- Balfrin Höhenweg
- Jura ridgeway
- Haute Route (international)
- Rheintaler Höhenweg
- Swiss Path
- Trans-Swiss Trail
- Via Alpina (international)
- Via del Mercato (international)
- Via Francigena (international)
- Via Jacobi

=== Trains and funiculars ===
For non-Swiss tourists, travelling the country by rail is possible with Interrail and Eurail passes, along with the Swiss Travel Pass valid for rail, bus and boat. Tourism-oriented trains in Switzerland mostly run under the Panorama Express (PE) category. Examples are:

- Bernina Express
- Glacier Express
- GoldenPass Express
- Gotthard Panorama Express
- Jungfrau Railway
- Voralpen Express

== Statistics ==
Official statistics of tourism were planned in 1852, but were only realized in 1934, and continued until 2003. Since 2004, the Federal Statistical Office had discontinued its statistics, but collaborates with Switzerland Tourism in the publication of yearly "Swiss Tourism Figures". In the year 2011, a total number of 4,967 registered hotels or hostels, offered a total of 240,000 beds in 128,000 rooms. This capacity was saturated to 41.7% (compared to 39.7% in 2005), amounting to a total of 38.8 million lodging nights. 14% of hotels were in Grisons, 12% each in the Valais and Eastern Switzerland, 11% in Central Switzerland and 9% in the Bernese Oberland. The ratio of lodging nights in relation to resident population ("tourism intensity", a measure for the relative importance of tourism to local economy) was largest in Grisons (8.3) and Bernese Oberland (5.3), compared to a Swiss average of 1.3. 56.4% of lodging nights were by visitors from abroad (broken down by nationality: 16.5% Germany, 6.3% United Kingdom, 4.8% United States, 3.6% France, 3.0% Italy).

The total financial volume associated with tourism, including transportation, is estimated to CHF 35.5 billion (as of 2010) although some of this comes from fuel tax and sales of motorway vignettes. The total gross value added from tourism is 14.9 billion. Tourism provides a total of 144,838 full-time equivalent jobs in the entire country. The total financial volume of tourist lodging is 5.19 billion CHF and eating at the lodging provides an additional 5.19 billion. The total gross value added of 14.9 billion is about 2.9% of Switzerland's 2010 nominal GDP of 550.57 billion CHF.

The most visited Swiss tourist attractions are first, the Rhine Falls, second, the Berne Bear exhibit (both without entrance fee), and third, with over 1.8 million paid entries: Zoo Basel.

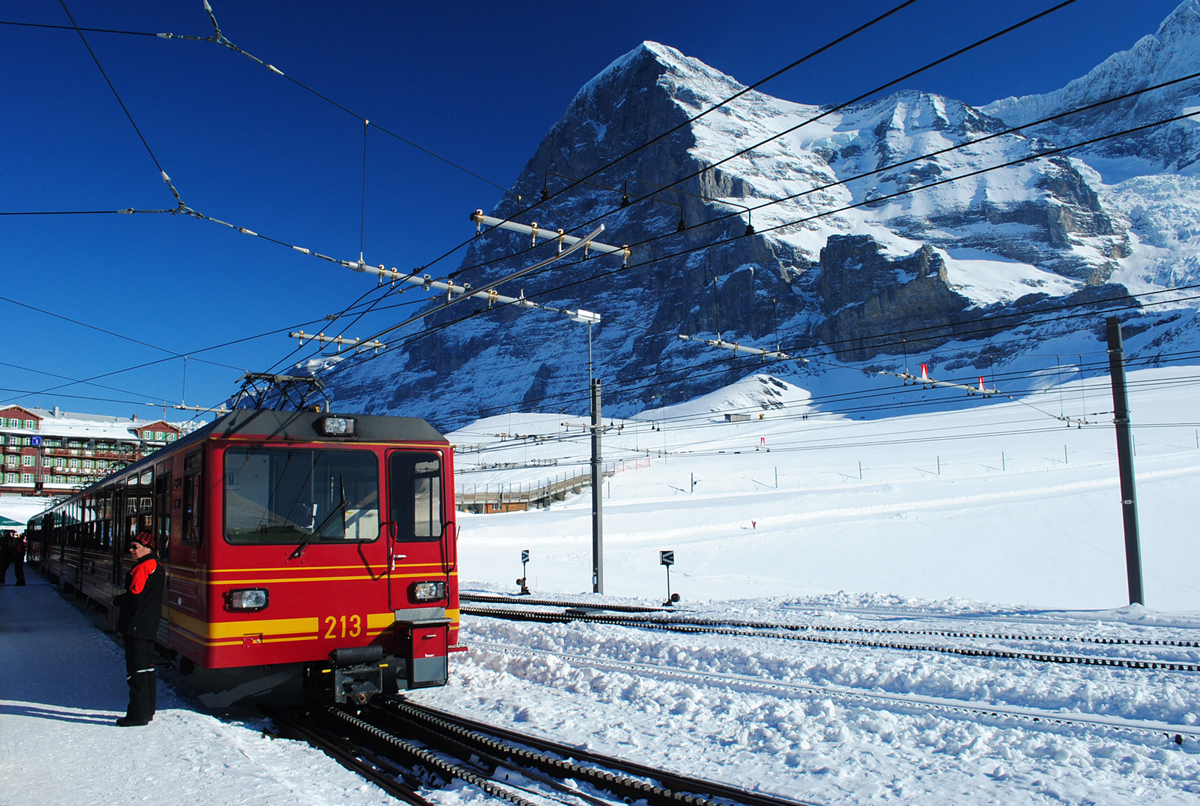
Jungfrau railway (with Eiger in the background), one of the major tourist attractions of the High Alps (1 million visitors in 2015 (up from 0.866 million in 2014). The Jungfraujoch railway station is the highest in Europe, at an elevation of 3,454 metres (11,332 ft).

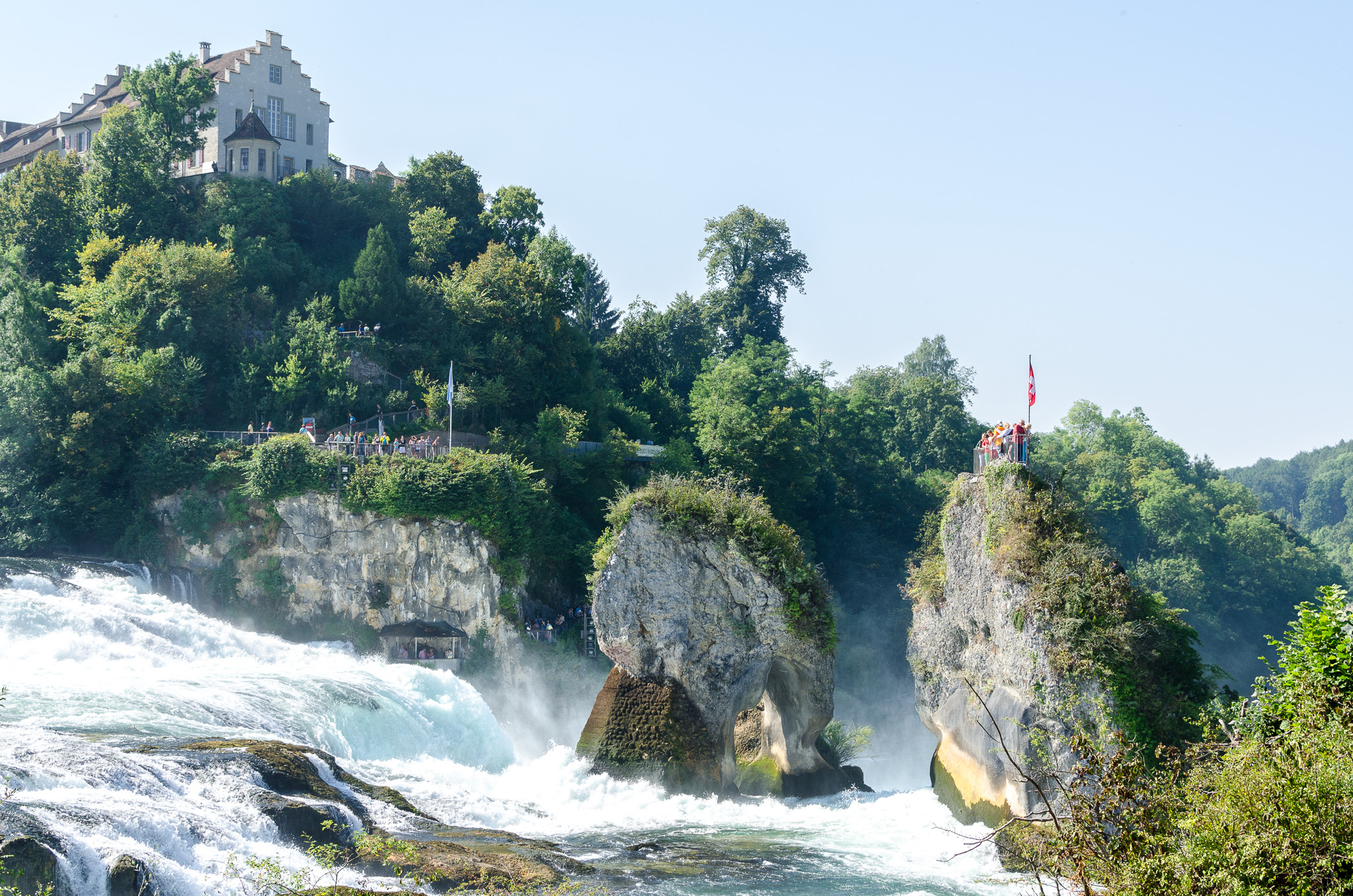
Rhine Falls and Laufen Castle

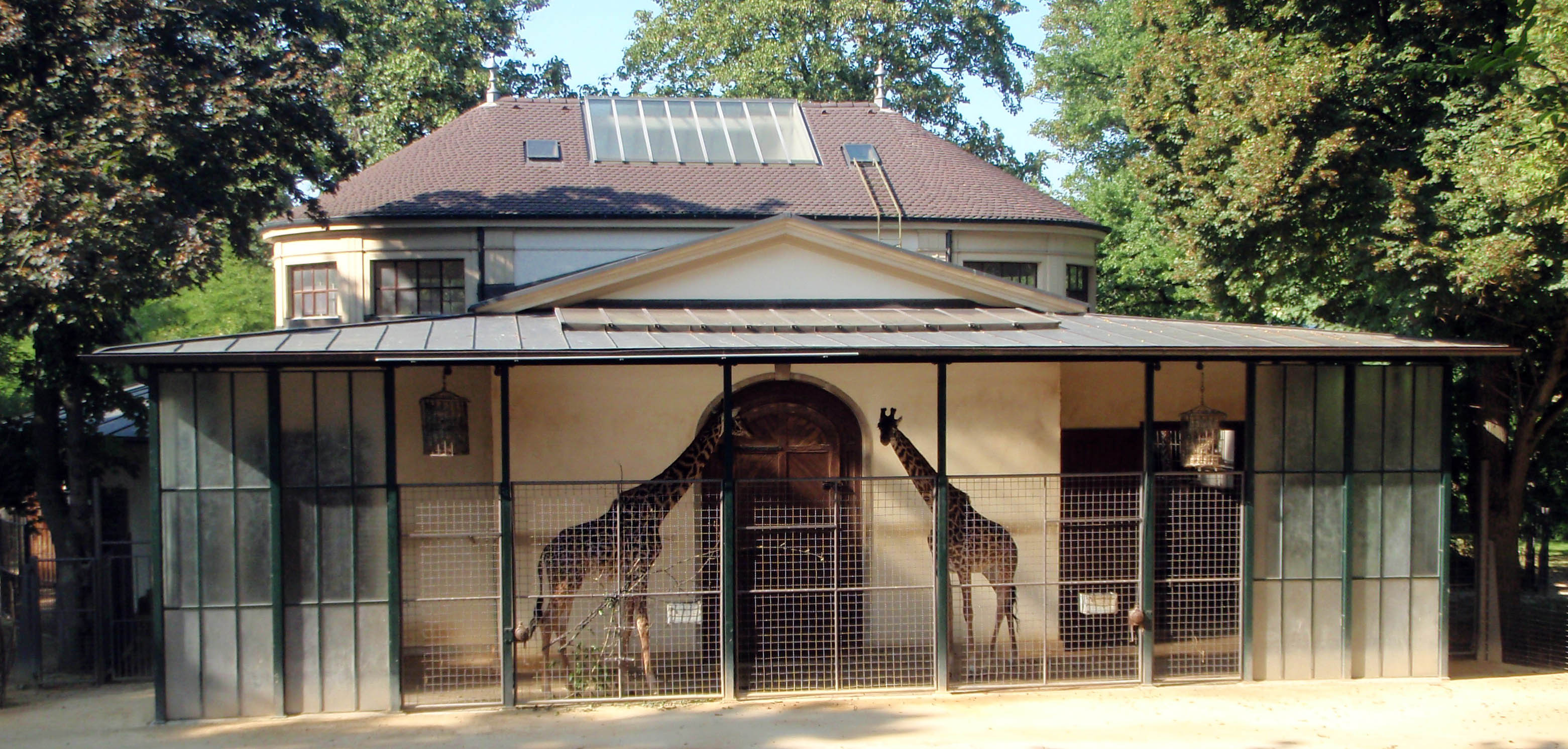
Antelope House at Zoo Basel, Switzerland's most visited tourist attraction with an entrance fee

=== Overnight stays by country ===
Most overnight stays in 2019 in Switzerland were from the following countries of residence:

Rank	Country	Number of overnight stays
1	Germany	3,925,653
2	United States	2,474,360
3	United Kingdom	1,641,429
4	China	1,583,799
5	France	1,227,105
6	Italy	887,679
7	(Cooperation Council for the Arab States of the Gulf) Gulf states	863,767
8	India	792,607
9	Netherlands	648,054
10	Belgium	636,425
Total foreign		21,639,611

== See also ==
- Economy of Switzerland
- Geography of Switzerland
- Grand Tour of Switzerland
- List of aerial tramways in Switzerland
- List of mountains of Switzerland accessible by public transport
- List of museums in Switzerland
- List of notable hotels in Switzerland
- List of World Heritage Sites in Switzerland
- Quality Label for Swiss Tourism
- Swiss School of Tourism and Hospitality
- Transport in Switzerland
