= Jura ridgeway =

Hiking trail in Switzerland

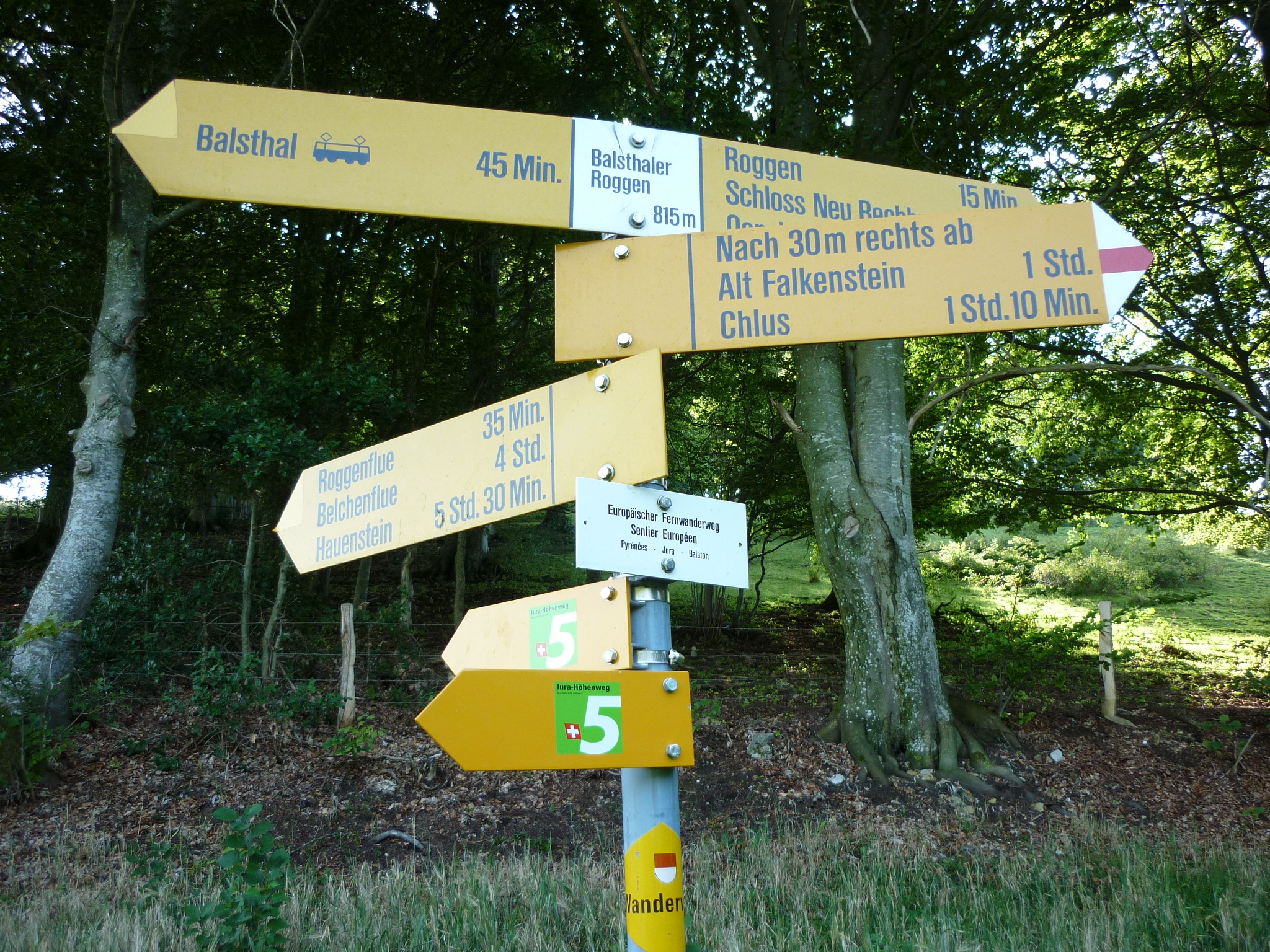
Signpost with Jura ridgeway sign

The Jura ridgeway is a long-distance hiking trail along the Jura mountain range in Switzerland. It starts in Dielsdorf, near Zurich, and follows the crest of the mountain ridge towards the southwest, to finish near Nyon on Lake Geneva.

The total distance covered is around 310 kilometres (190 mi), and can be completed in around 17 or 18 days walking. The elevation ranges from 320 to 1,680 metres (1,050 to 5,510 ft).

In German (on the eastern portion of the route), the path is known as the Jura Höhenweg ("Jura high path"). More than half the route is in French-speaking areas, where it is known as the Chemin des Crêtes du Jura ("Jura ridge way"). It is marked with many official signposts using a white number "5".

This ridgeway forms part of the long-distance European walking route E4 between Spain and Greece.

== See also ==
- Hiking in Switzerland
- Swiss hiking network
