= Trans-Swiss Trail =

Long-distance hiking trail in Switzerland

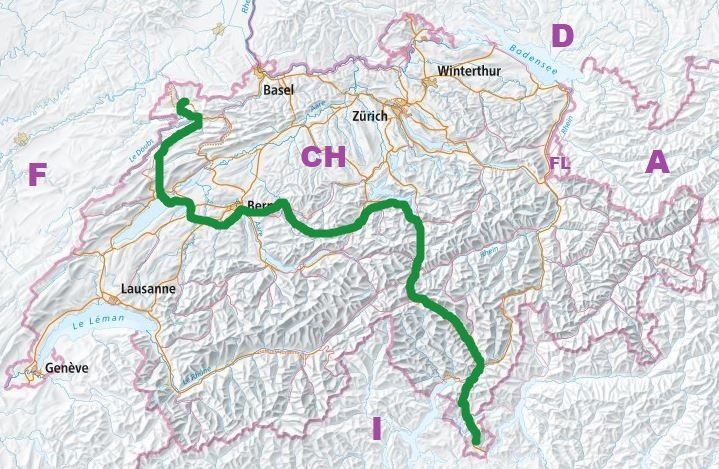
Route of the Trans Swiss Trail

Trans-Swiss Trail is a long-distance hiking trail in Switzerland. It starts in Porrentruy in the north near the French border, and cuts south over the Alps to finish in Lugano.

Passing through French, German and Italian-speaking areas of Switzerland, the route covers approximately 460 km through a wide variety of landscapes, with altitudes between 235 metres / 771 ft (in Bellinzona) to over 2,000 metres / 6,600 ft (on the Gotthard pass).

The route is marked with green signposts with the number "2", part of the new national signposting scheme.

== See also ==
- Hiking in Switzerland
- Swiss hiking network
