= Via Jacobi =

Pilgrimage route across Switzerland

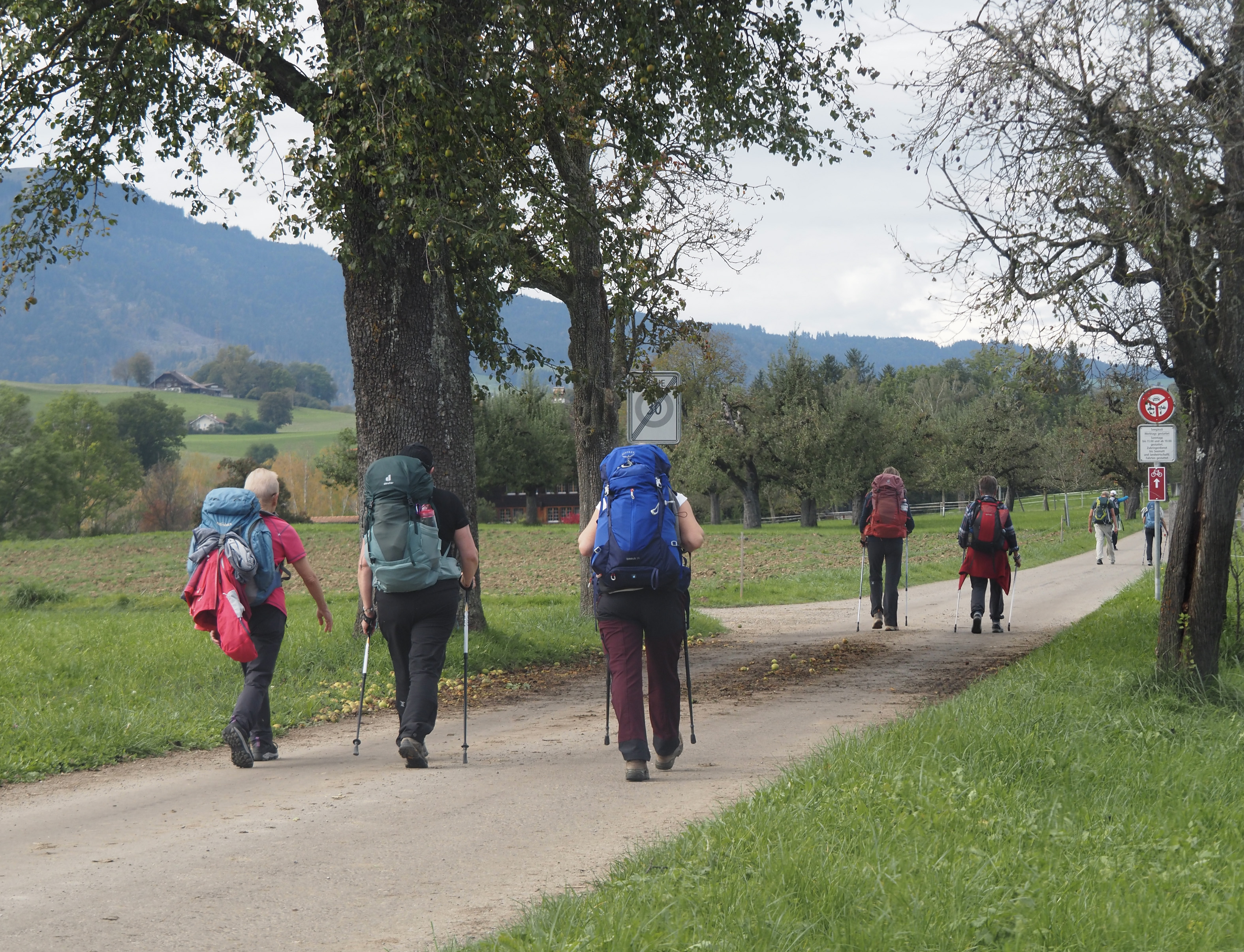
Hikers near Amsoldingen

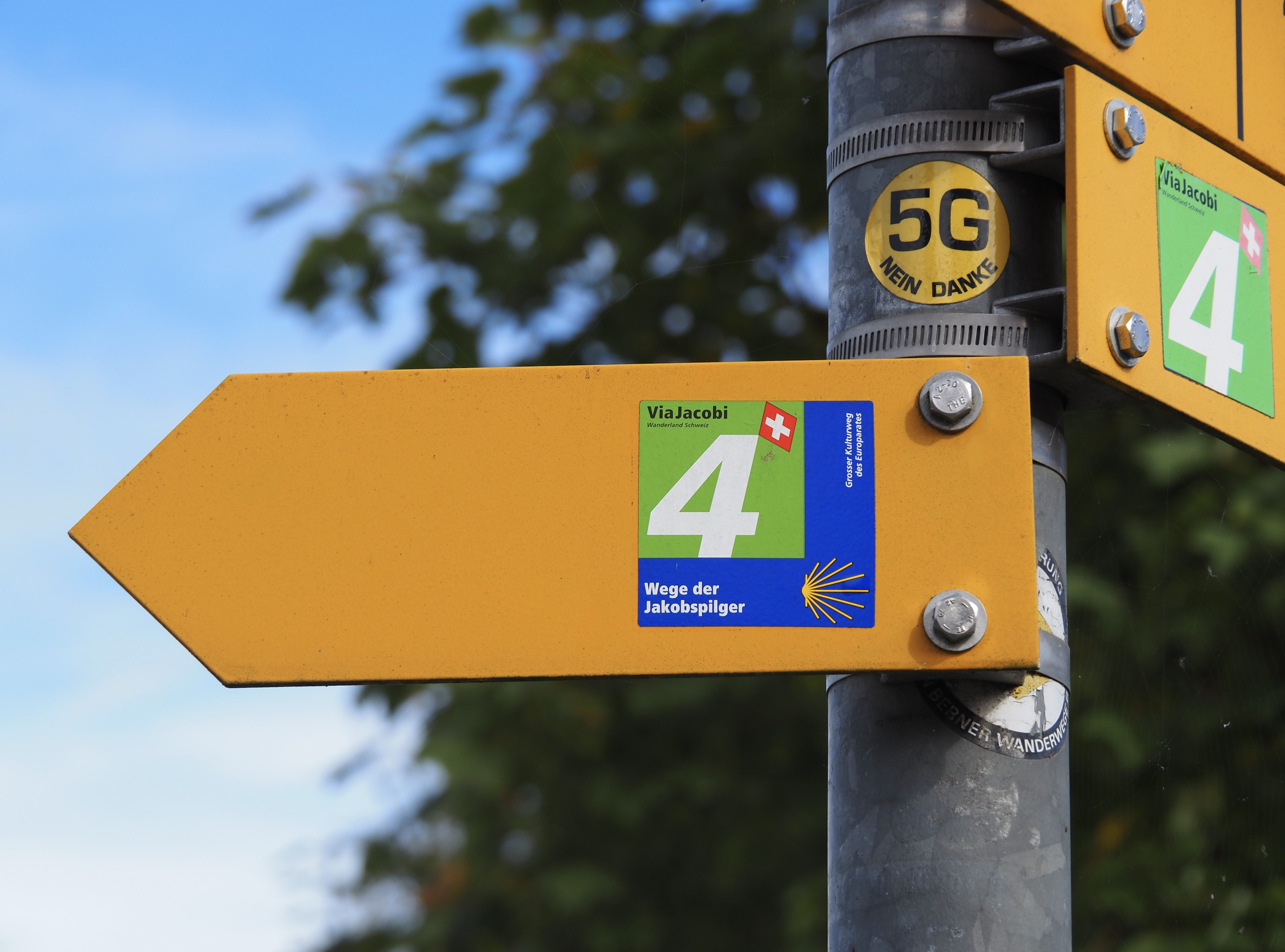
Sign

The Via Jacobi (German: Jakobsweg, French: Chemin de Saint-Jacques-de-Compostelle) is a hiking trail in Switzerland that leads from Lake Constance to Geneva, with different route options. It is part of the European Way of St. James, a pilgrimage route to the grave of St. James in Santiago de Compostela, Galicia, Spain, one of the oldest religious traditions in Europe.

== Route ==
The Via Jacobi leads across Switzerland along the foot of the Swiss Alps from Lake Constance in the north-east to Geneva in the south-west. Chapels, churches, and hostels, together with a diverse cultural and visual landscape, offer an interesting hiking experience. One can emphasize the spiritual aspect of the pilgrimage or simply enjoy the journey. The Via Jacobi offers the possibility of hiking its entire length in approximately 33 stages or any portion of the route.

The Way of St. James continues through France to Santiago de Compostela from Geneva by the GR65 – Via Gebennensis to Le-Puy-en-Velay and then the GR65 – Via Podiensis towards Saint-Jean-Pied-de-Port at the foot of the Pyrenees where it becomes the French Way leading to Santiago. The two routes through France (Via Gebennensis and Via Podiensis) are waymarked as one of the French major hiking routes, the GR 65.

== See also ==
- Way of St. James (route descriptions)
- Hiking in Switzerland
