= Grand Tour of Switzerland =

Tourist route

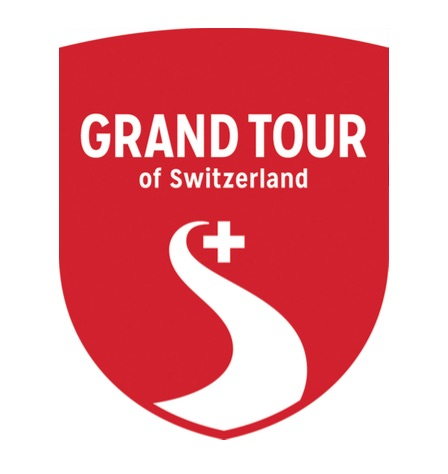
The official logo of The Grand Tour of Switzerland.

The Grand Tour of Switzerland is a 1,643 km (1021 mile) tourist circuit in Switzerland, devised by Switzerland Tourism and The Grand Tour of Switzerland Association in 2015. Split into 8 stages, the circuit traverses through 13 UNESCO World Heritage sights, 5 Alpine passes, and 22 lakes. A key component of the circuit are the 83 photo boards across the route, showcasing various views, from mountain passes to cityscapes.

Along with the car and motorcycle-themed tour, Switzerland Tourism operates a Grand Train Tour of Switzerland. The tour, which can be done all year round, is around 1,285 kilometres (798 mi) long. The Grand Train Tour includes journeys on Switzerland’s most famous panoramic trains, like the Bernina Express, the Glacier Express and the GoldenPass Line.

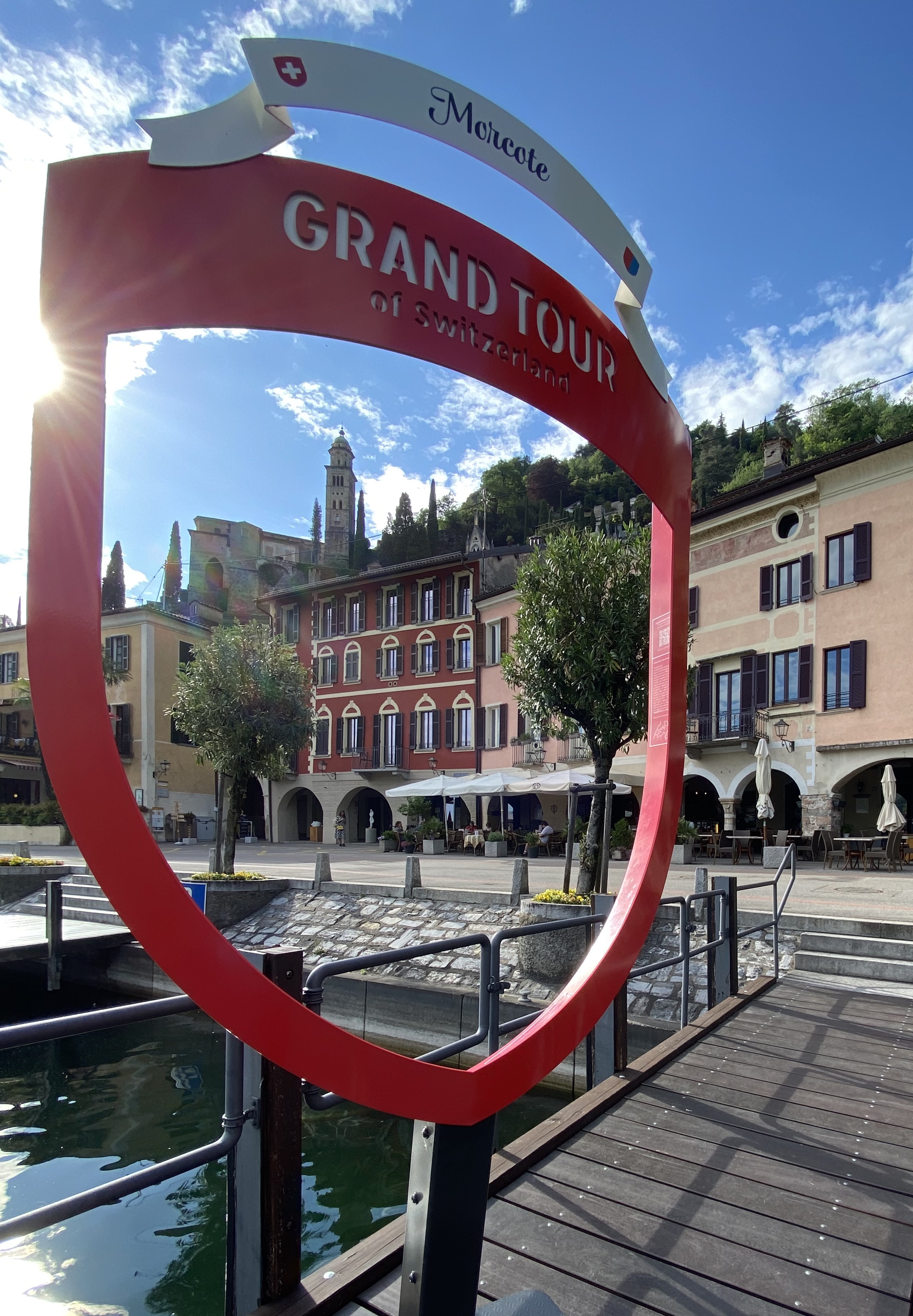
A Grand Tour of Switzerland photo board in Morcote, off the shores of Lake Lugano.
