= Quality Label for Swiss Tourism =

The Quality Label for Swiss Tourism is a certification for quality standards provided by the Swiss Tourism Federation. Founded in 1998 a total of 4034 establishments have already been awarded. There are three levels of the quality label. Its objective is to raise the awareness of quality in businesses, to foster collaboration between the various providers. The Quality Label gives the certainty that the company or the establishment have dedicated themselves to hospitality and specific quality standards. Any company in the service sector in Switzerland is able to be awarded with the Q-Label. Management and staff members of these Q-enterprises commit themselves to stick to the definitions of the requirements provided by the Swiss Tourism Federation for each of the three Q-Levels. These touristic enterprises allow themselves, in the context of the Quality Program, to be judged by customers and bring improvements if necessary. Currently awarded properties are hotels, restaurants, local public transport services, mountain railways and taxi companies.

- The Quality Label Level I
- The Quality Label Level II
- The Quality Label Level III - The Quality Label Level III is awarded to establishments that developed and successfully implemented a comprehensive and internationally recognised quality management system (QMS) such as ISO 9001:2000 or EFQM.
