= Swiss hiking network =

Network of hiking trails in Switzerland

Swiss Hiking Network
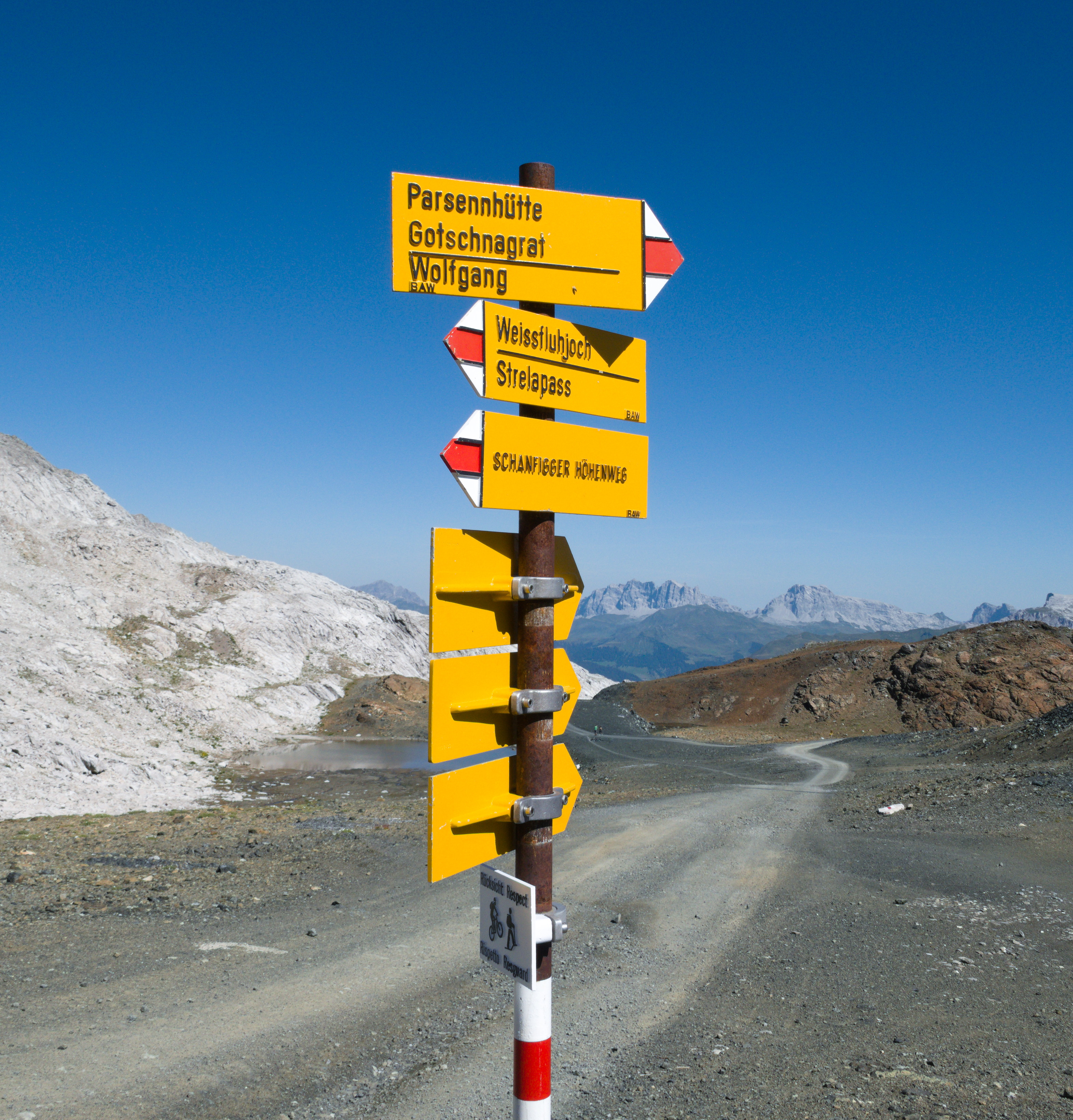
- Total length: Over 65,000 km
- Number of signposts: Approximately 50,000
- Legal protection: Since 1985
- Maintained by: Cantons, municipalities, and volunteers
- Categories: Hiking trails, mountain hiking trails, alpine hiking trails

The Swiss hiking network is a comprehensive system of marked hiking trails covering more than 65,000 kilometres across Switzerland. Protected by federal law since 1985, it represents one of the world's most extensive and well-maintained pedestrian trail networks. The network is distinguished by its distinctive yellow signposting system and its integration into the Swiss Federal Constitution.

== History ==
=== Early development ===
Hiking as a recreational and sporting activity became popular in Switzerland during the second half of the 19th century with the modernisation of society. The opening of mountain regions to tourism facilitated the breakthrough of alpinism and hiking tourism. The Swiss Alpine Club, founded in 1863, pioneered this development.

Around 1900, the Swiss population's need for recreation in nature grew significantly. Hiking was also invested with pedagogical significance, perceived as an expression of a return to a natural way of life. Hiking excursions were already part of secondary school programmes in the 19th century. As motor vehicles became more common in the 1920s, pedestrians increasingly sought alternatives to roads for recreational walking.

In 1930, schoolteacher Jakob Ess from Zürich took his pupils on an excursion to the Klausen Pass, a mountain pass at 2,000 metres altitude connecting the cantons of Uri and Glarus. During the outing, the group repeatedly encountered motor vehicles on the mountain road, prompting Ess to conceive of establishing a network of pedestrian routes separate from vehicular traffic.

In the early 1930s, Ess began creating trail markings independently, though without an established standard system. In 1933, Ess and Otto Binder, secretary of Pro Juventute, founded the Zurich Working Group for Hiking Trails (Arbeitsgemeinschaft für Wanderwege). Just one year later, in 1934, they established the Swiss Federation for Hiking Tourism (now known as Suisse Rando) at the national level.

At its founding, the association adopted a uniform signpost design: yellow markers with black text, which remain the standard for official hiking trails today. Though initially met with skepticism, this standardised approach proved effective and gained widespread acceptance, leading to the establishment of cantonal chapters throughout Switzerland.

=== World War II and post-war expansion ===
During World War II, the Swiss army removed trail signposts as a security measure against potential foreign invasion. The hiking association used this period to develop plans for new routes and prepare updated markings, enabling rapid restoration of the network after the war's conclusion.

The network has expanded continuously in the decades since, with steady increases in both trail length and usage.

== Legal protection ==
Federal Act on Footpaths and Hiking Trails
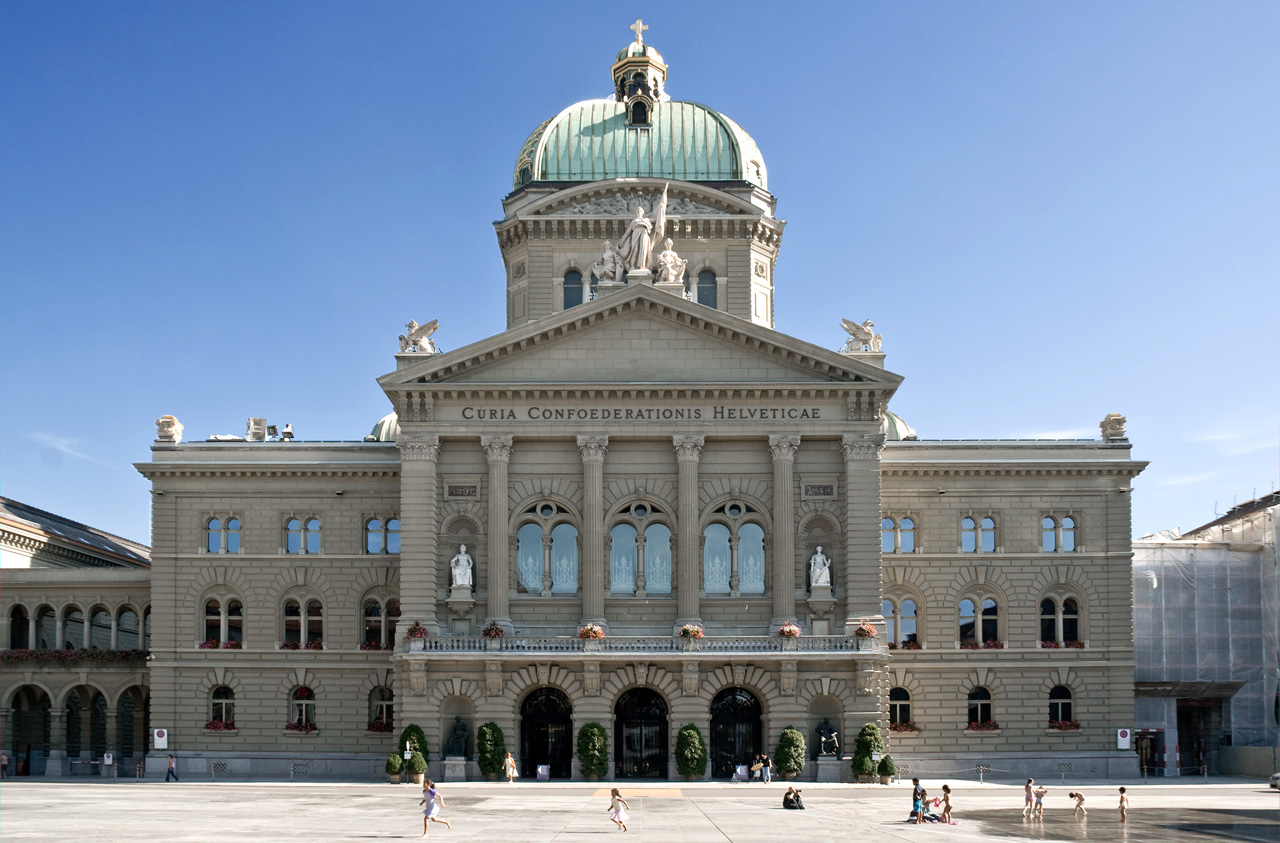

Federal Assembly of Switzerland
- Long title: (SR 704)
- Territorial extent: Switzerland
- Enacted by: Federal Assembly of Switzerland
- Enacted: 4 October 1985
- Commenced: 1 January 1987
- Status: Current legislation

During the 1970s, concerns grew that Switzerland's expanding road network was threatening traditional footpaths and hiking trails. In response, the Swiss Hiking Federation launched a popular initiative to enshrine their protection in the Federal Constitution. The initiative was approved by 77.6% of voters and all cantons in a referendum held in February 1979, leading to the addition of a new constitutional article requiring the Confederation to promote and preserve a nationwide network of pedestrian and hiking paths.

To implement this mandate, Parliament enacted the Federal Act on Footpaths and Hiking Trails (Note: German: Bundesgesetz über Fuss- und Wanderwege, FWG; French: Loi fédérale sur les chemins pour piétons et les chemins de randonnée pédestre, LCPR; Italian: Legge federale sui percorsi pedonali ed i sentieri, LPS) in October 1985, which entered into force in 1987. Under this legislation, cantonal governments are primarily responsible for managing hiking networks, often delegating operational duties to municipal authorities and regional branches of Suisse Rando.

The constitutional provision now appears as Article 88 of the 1999 Federal Constitution, making Switzerland one of the few countries to grant hiking trails explicit constitutional protection.

== Network structure ==
=== Trail categories ===
The Swiss hiking network is divided into three categories, each marked with distinctive colours:

1. Hiking trails (German: Wanderwege, French: Chemins de randonnée, Italian: Sentieri; marked in yellow): accessible paths are suitable for all hikers with no special requirements beyond normal caution. They typically avoid motorised traffic routes and do not use asphalt or concrete surfaces. Steep sections may include stairs, and areas with fall risks generally feature protective railings. Rivers are crossed via footbridges or bridges. Hikers should wear shoes with non-slip soles. These trails comprise approximately 62% of the network.
2. Mountain hiking trails (German: Bergwanderwege, French: Chemins de randonnée en montagne, Italian: Sentieri di montagna; marked in white-red-white): routes that include challenging sections, often traversing steep, narrow, and exposed terrain. Particularly difficult passages may be secured with ropes or chains, and hikers may need to ford streams. Users require good physical fitness, sure-footedness, absence of vertigo, and awareness of mountain hazards including rockfall, slipping risks, and rapid weather changes. Mountain hiking trails account for approximately 36.5% of the network.
3. Alpine hiking trails (German: Alpinwanderwege, French: Chemins de randonnée alpine, Italian: Sentieri escursionistici alpini; marked in white-blue-white): routes that partially cross unmarked terrain, including snowfields, glaciers, scree, and rock faces with short climbing sections. Infrastructure cannot be guaranteed and is limited to securing areas with particularly high fall risks. Users must possess excellent physical condition, sure-footedness, freedom from vertigo, and capability for hand-assisted climbing, along with extensive knowledge of mountain hazards. Additional equipment such as an altimeter, compass, and for glacier crossings, rope, ice axe, and crampons may be required. Alpine hiking trails represent approximately 1.5% of the network.

The network is also divided into national, regional, and local routes.

=== Signposting system ===
Approximately 50,000 signposts mark the network throughout the country. A distinctive feature of Swiss hiking signage is the display of estimated hiking duration rather than only distance to destinations. These time estimates assume an average walking pace of 4.2 kilometres per hour, excluding breaks.

== Maintenance and organisation ==
=== Responsibilities ===
Under the Federal Act, cantonal governments hold primary responsibility for trail planning, maintenance, financing, and signposting. However, most cantons delegate construction and maintenance tasks to municipalities. The system includes 26 cantonal hiking trail organisations.

Approximately 2,000 volunteers contribute to network maintenance.

=== Costs ===
Network maintenance averages approximately CHF 800 per kilometre annually, totalling around CHF 50 million per year for the entire system. Municipalities provide the majority of funding for trail construction and maintenance, though cantons occasionally contribute to or directly maintain certain trails. Additional co-financing may come from entities such as cable car companies or tourism organisations.

=== Technical standards ===
The construction and maintenance of hiking trails follow detailed technical guidelines. For standard hiking trails marked in yellow, the target width is 100 to 120 centimetres, though this may be adjusted based on specific circumstances such as safety requirements or terrain constraints.

Trails are constructed considering multiple factors including topography, soil type, local climate, water drainage, and compatibility with nature protection, forestry, and agricultural interests. Water management is particularly crucial, as most trail damage results from inadequate water drainage. Various techniques are employed, including transverse drainage, longitudinal ditches, and surface grading to ensure proper water runoff.

== Cultural significance ==
Hiking ranks as Switzerland's most popular sporting and recreational activity. Approximately 2.7 million regular hikers—about 44% of the population—undertake an average of 20 hiking excursions annually. A 2019 study by Swiss Hiking Trails found that approximately four million people aged 15 and older hiked regularly, representing 58% of the Swiss resident population. Overall, about 80% of the population used the network at least occasionally. While the network's popularity continues growing, usage patterns show concentration, with over 90% of hikers using only 10% of available trails.

The hiking network embodies Switzerland's direct democratic traditions, having gained constitutional protection through popular referendum. It demonstrates the country's connection to mountainous landscapes and commitment to infrastructure maintenance. The yellow signposts have become symbolic of Switzerland's relationship with hiking and natural spaces.

The network also incorporates historical communication routes where feasible, as specified in federal legislation. Conservation of historically significant routes may qualify for additional federal and cantonal funding.

== See also ==
- Swiss Alps
- Tourism in Switzerland
