= SBB Re 460 =

Type of electric locomotive

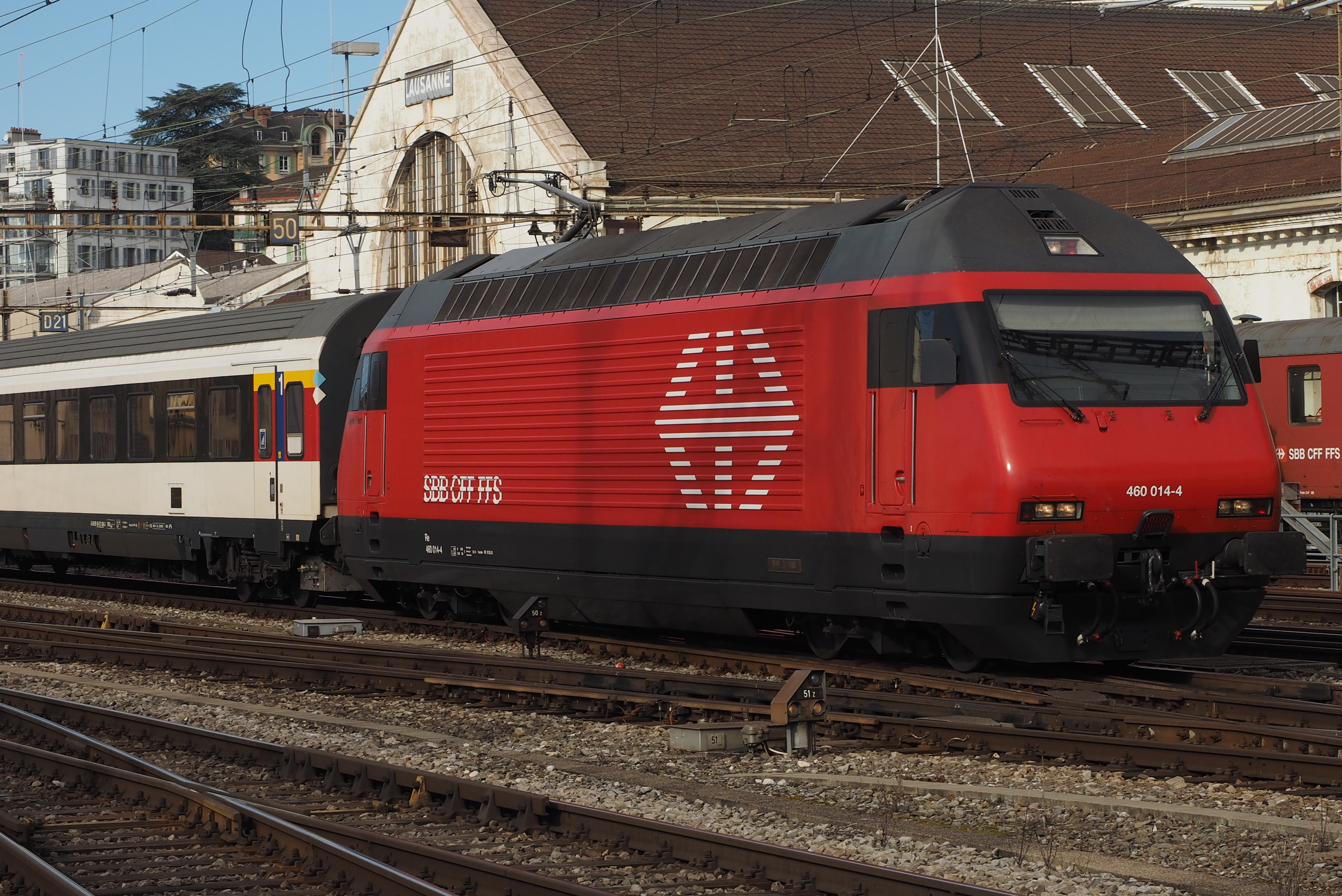
- Re 460 in 2015
Type and origin
- Power type: Electric
- Designer: Pininfarina
- Builder: SLM, Winterthur; ABB, Zürich
- Build date: 1991–1996
- Total produced: 119
Specifications
- Configuration
  - UIC: Bo′Bo′
- Gauge: 1,435 mm (4 ft 8 1/2 in) standard gauge
- Length: 18,500 mm (60 ft 8 in)
- Width: 3,000 mm (9 ft 10 in)
- Height: 4,310 mm (14 ft 2 in)
- Loco weight: 84 t (83 long tons; 93 short tons)
- Electric system/s: 15 kV 16 2/3 Hz AC Catenary
- Current pickup: Pantograph
- Traction motors: ABB 4-FXA 7065 3-phase with GTO- (after modernisation IGBT-) VVVF
- Loco brake: Air, regenerative and magnetic track brake
- Train brakes: Air
- Couplers: buffers and chain
Performance figures
- Maximum speed: 200 km/h (124 mph) (Note: The allowed top speed is 200 km/h. In order to get the approval to run at that speed, the locomotive must be able to go 15% faster; thus, the technical top speed is 230 km/h (143 mph), see Article by Bruno Lämmli Archived 2011-07-06 at the Wayback Machine (German). However, this is not relevant in normal operation. Therefore, the table holds the allowed top speed, as for any other rail vehicle.)
- Power output: 6,100 kW (8,180 hp) max. 5,600 kW (7,510 hp) cont.
- Tractive effort: 230 kN (51,710 lbf) cont. @88 km/h (55 mph)
Career
- Operators: Swiss Federal Railways, MTR Corporation (Re 460); BLS AG (Re 465); Vy (El 18); VR Group (Sr2); Indian Railways (WAP-5)
- Class: SBB: 460 000 - 460 118; MTR: TLN 001 - TLS 002; BLS: 465 001 - 465 018; Vy: El 18 2241 - 2262; VR: Sr2 3201 - 3246; IR: WAP-5 30000 - 30200, 35000+
- Nicknames: Lok 2000

The Re 460, popularly known as the Lok 2000, are a class of modern four-axle electric locomotives of Swiss Federal Railways (SBB CFF FFS), similar to the Re 465 of BLS. Although designed as multipurpose locomotives, the Re 460 are now used only for hauling long-distance passenger trains in Switzerland (one service to Konstanz). Variants of the Re 460 are used in China, Finland, India and Norway.

The Lok 2000-family locomotives are the last mainline locomotives to be quasi fully developed and produced by Swiss companies. Locomotive construction in Switzerland has since been largely discontinued for economic reasons. Only Stadler Rail still manufactures shunting and rack railway locomotives in the country.

== Assignment ==
The series was introduced as part of the Rail 2000 project, a massive project to modernise and improve the capacity of Switzerland's railways.

Upon their entry into service in the early 1990s, they replaced the Ae 3/6^{I}, Ae 4/7, and Re 4/4^{I} series units, and displaced many of the Re 4/4^{II} series into lesser duties.

When SBB was split up on 1 September 1999, locomotives Re 460 No. 079–118 were assigned to the freight division, later becoming SBB Cargo. It was seen as an advantage to use all Re 460, which had been designed for 200 km/h (120 mph), for passenger service. The passenger division passed the Re 6/6 to SBB Cargo and bought Re 460 079–095 on 1 January 2003, 096–102 in 2004, and the rest in 2005.

While originally designed as a multipurpose locomotive, they are now used for passenger services only, often in conjunction with the IC 2000 double-decker or EW IV trainsets (often used to pull InterCity and InterRegio trains in the German and French language areas). Their freight role has been assumed by Re 482s, Re 420/421 and Re 620 (previously also Re 481).

They are maintained at Yverdon.

== Modernization ==
Starting in 2017, the Swiss Federal Railways enbarked on a modernization of the Re 460, to be finished in 2022. The main goal was to achieve greater energy efficiency by upgrading traction converter technology to IGBT from GTO. Other efficiency gains included switching off tractive power to individual bogies when not needed, using more efficient air compressors, and operating transformer cooling fans only as needed. The revamped locomotives can be externally identified by the front-facing logo, the number mounted on the side of the front, and by their glossy, as opposed to matte, red paint.

All 119 Re 460 locomotives had been converted by November 2022. The renovation work was done at the SBB workshops in Yverdon.

== Naming and liveries ==
Like several other Swiss locomotives (e.g. Ae 6/6, Re 6/6, Re 450), almost all Re 460 locomotives are named. In case of the Re 460, the names are applied below the cab window at one end.

List of Re 460 Engine Nos. with their names
(Engine number is Re 460 xxx)
No.	Name	No.	Name	No.	Name
000	Grauholz	040	Napf	080	Tre Valli
001	Lötschberg	041	Mendrisiotto	081	Pfänder
002	Seeland	042	Albis	082	Ceresio
003	Milieu du Monde	043	Dreispitz	083	—
004	Uetliberg	044	Zugerland	084	Helvetia (from 12 September 2006 to August 2007: Neftenbach)
005	Val d'Anniviers	045	Rigi	085	Pilatus
006	Lavaux	046	Polmengo	086	Ägerisee
007	Junior	047	Maderanertal	087	Säuliamt
008	La Gruyère	048	Züri Wyland	088	Limmat
009	Le jet d´eau	049	Pfannenstiel	089	Freiamt
010	Löwenberg	050	Züspa	090	Goffersberg
011	Léman	051	Staffelegg	091	Werdenberg
012	Erguël	052	Eigenamt	092	Fridolin
013	Nord Vaudois	053	Suhrental	093	Rhein
014	Val du Trient	054	Dreiländereck	094	Rhätia
015	Dübendorf II	055	Lillehammer	095	Bachtel
016	Rohrdorferberg Reusstal	056	—	096	Furttal
017	Les Diablerets	057	Val-de-Ruz	097	Studenland
018	—	058	La Côte	098	Balsberg
019	Terre Sainte	059	La Béroche	099	Bodensee
020	Idée suisse	060	Val-de-Travers	100	Tösstal
021	—	061	Wiggertal	101	Bözberg
022	Sihl	062	Ergolz	102	Lägern
023	Wankdorf	063	Brunegg	103	Heitersberg
024	Rheintal	064	Mythen	104	Toggenburg
025	Striegel	065	Rotsee	105	Fürstenland
026	Fricktal	066	Finse	106	Munot
027	Joggeli	067	Hohle Gasse	107	Glärnisch
028	Seetal	068	Gütsch	108	Engadin
029	Eulach	069	Verkehrshaus	109	Alpstein
030	Säntis	070	—	110	Mariaberg
031	Chaumont	071	Mittelland	111	Kempt
032	—	072	Reuss	112	Thurtal
033	—	073	Monte Ceneri	113	Irchel
034	Aare	074	—	114	Circus Knie
035	—	075	Schafmatt	115	Heidiland
036	Franches-Montagnes	076	Leventina	116	Ostschweiz
037	Sempacher See	077	Chunnel	117	Zürichsee
038	Hauenstein	078	Monte Generoso	118	Gotthard / Gottardo
039	Rochers de Naye	079	Weissenstein		

=== Advertising ===
Due in part to their large, mainly flat bodysides, Swiss Federal Railways were approached early on with requests for the Re 460 to be used as mobile advertising hoardings. Despite opposition from some quarters, the money that could be earned swayed the decision, and the first such locomotive, Re 460 015, was unveiled in 1994 in Agfa livery. Today no other loco type in Switzerland carries so many different liveries.

List of alternate names due to special liveries
Serial No.	Engine's name	Period	Livery
Re 460 003	Roger	2008	National Suisse / Roger Federer
Re 460 014	FORTICO	21 Jun 1996 – 30 Oct 1997	Holderbank Cement: HCB
Re 460 015	uf u dervo	27 Jun 2004 – 9 Oct 2006	Schweizer Radio DRS III
Re 460 016	TRAMONT	11 Apr 1997 – 27 May 1998	ABB / Adtranz I-V
Re 460 018	Louis Danzas	23 Jan 1995 – 17 Apr 1997	Danzas AG
Re 460 018	Leutschenbach I	22 Jan 2005 – 5 Oct 2005	Schweizer Fernsehen SF DRS II
Re 460 019	Miele	17 Aug 1995 – 4 Nov 1996	Miele: Miele Schweizer- und Euronorm
Re 460 020	idée suisse	24 Mar 1999 – unknown	SRG SSR idée suisse
Re 460 021	Lovely	4 Oct 1995 – 26 Mar 1997	ZVSM: Milch. Die natürliche Energie
Re 460 024	Doris Leuthard	22 Jun 2006 – unknown	Zugkraft Aargau II
Re 460 032	Leutschenbach II	6 Jan 1997 – 18 Oct 2005	Schweizer Fernsehen SF DRS Leutschenbach II
Re 460 033	Ascolino	2 Sep 1996 – 31 Oct 1997	Ascom verbindet Menschen
Re 460 035	Roger	2015	Helvetia Insurance / Roger Federer
Re 460 040	Helen Lüthi	20 Apr 2002 – 5 Sep 2005	100 Jahre SBB 1902–2002
Re 460 056	Leutschenbach I	6 Jan 1997 – 5 Aug 2004	Schweizer Fernsehen SF DRS Leutschenbach I
Re 460 073	DRS 1	12 May 2004 – 10 May 2007	Schweizer Radio DRS 1
Re 460 079	Morgestraich	5 Oct 1999 – 15 Mar 2004	ChemOil Logistics AG
Re 460 079	Stein am Rhein	30 Mar 2004 – 20 Jul 2005	25 Jahre Verkehrsclub der Schweiz
Re 460 101	Magic Ticket	2 Jun 2004 – unknown	SBB: Magic Ticket – Hopp Schwiiz

== BLS Re 465 ==
Swiss company BLS operates 18 similar locomotives, designated Re 465. These locomotives have efficiency modifications, slightly higher power output and tractive effort and individual axle control rather than individual bogie control, but are otherwise identical to the Re 460. Numbered 001–018, all are named. These locomotives are used for both passenger and freight duties by BLS.

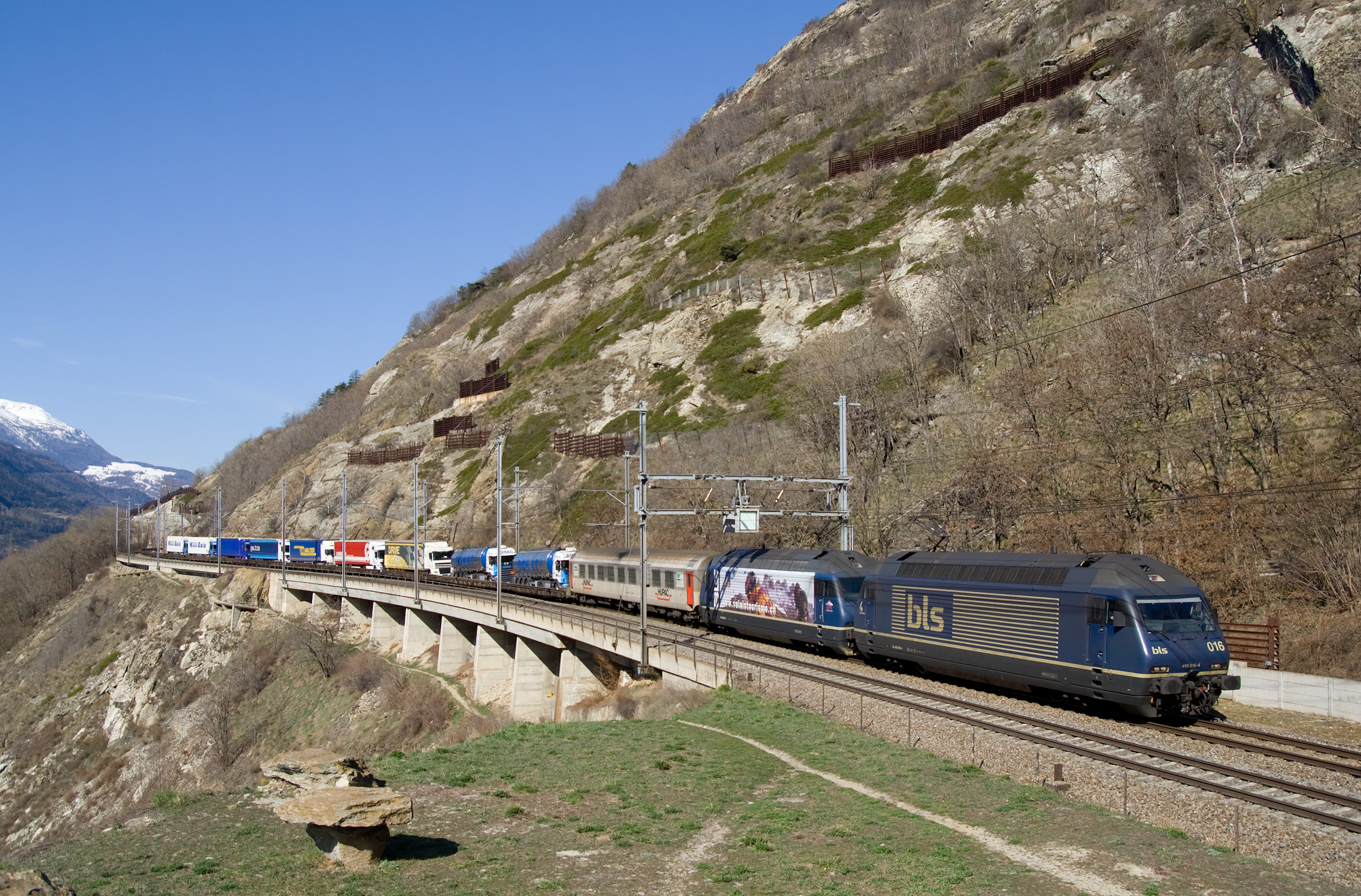
Rolling highway near Lalden, pulled by two BLS Re 465

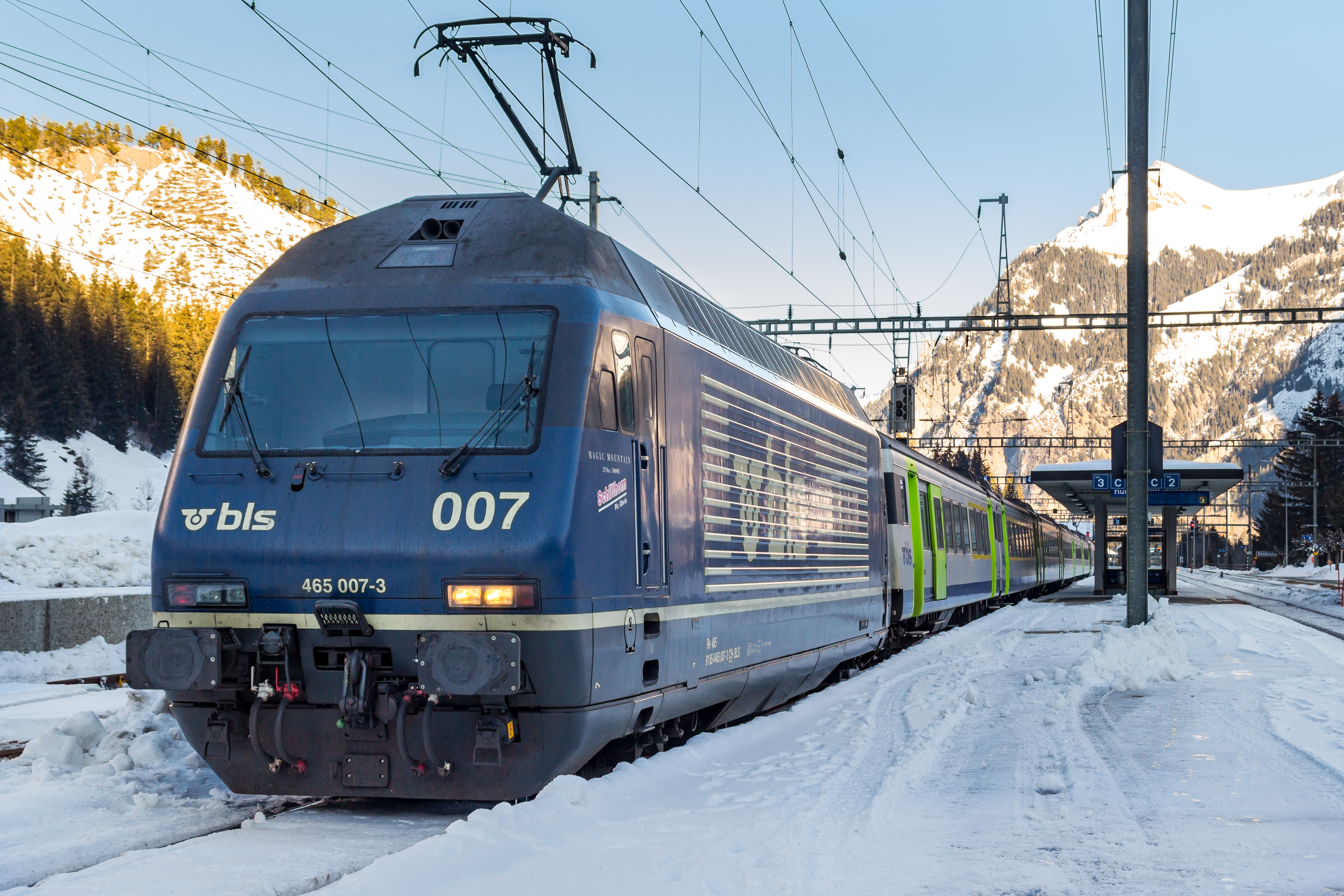
BLS Re 465 007 named Schilthorn („Piz Gloria“) (Note: see On Her Majesty's Secret Service)

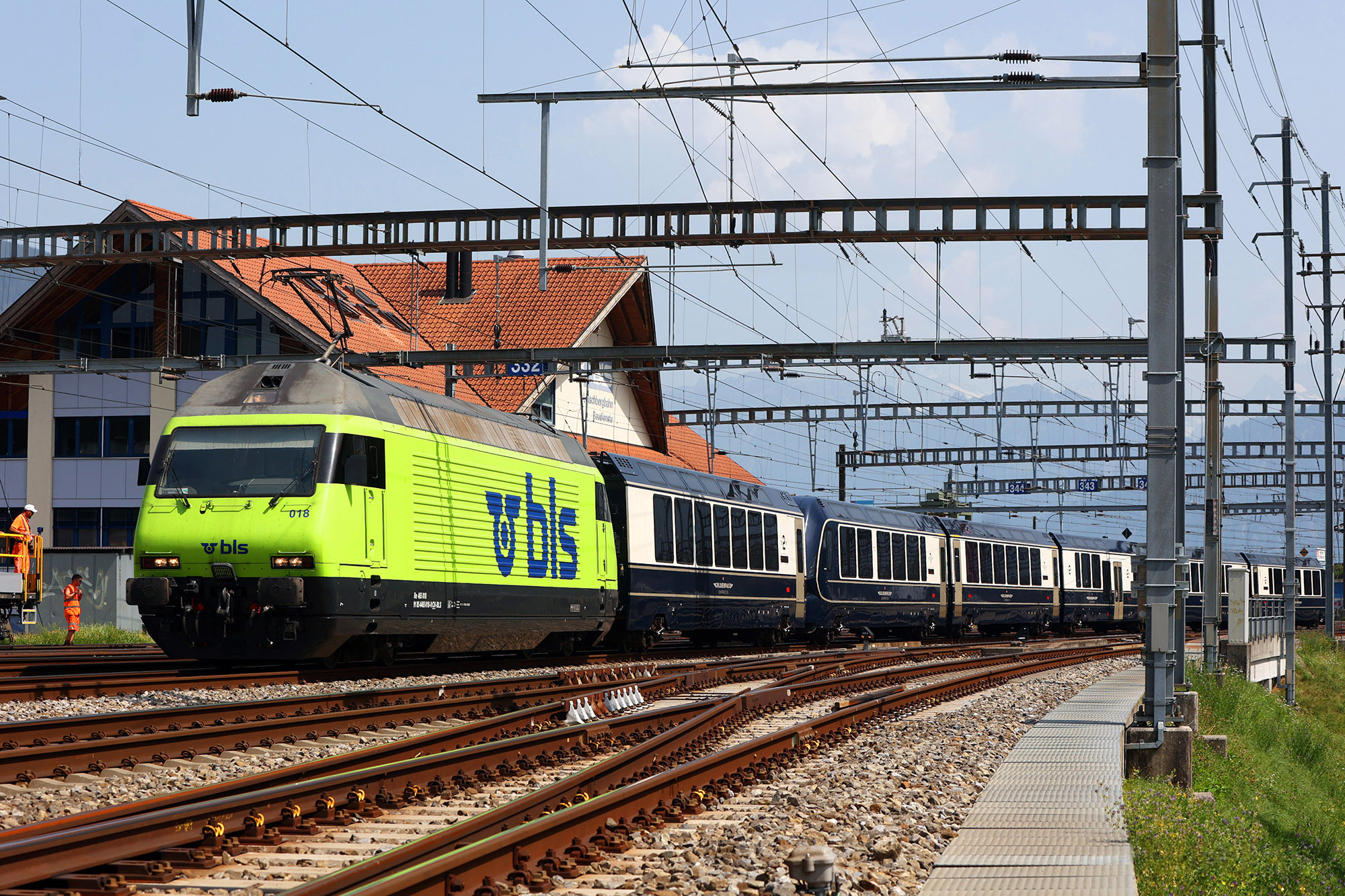
BLS Re 465 with new livery

List of BLS locomotive names
No.	Name
001	Simplon/Sempione (BLS AlpTransit/Lötschberg livery)
002	Gornergrat
003	Jungfraujoch–Seespiele
004	Mittelallalin-Valaistourisme
005	Niesen
006	Lauchernalp
007	Schilthorn
008	Niederhorn
009	Napf
010	Mont Vully
011	Wisenberg
012	Euro Tunnel
013	Stockhorn
014	Spalenberg
015	Vue-des-Alpes
016	Centovalli
017	Schrattenflue
018	Brienz Rothorn Bahn

== Usage in other countries ==
=== Curent operators ===
==== Finland ====
The 46 Sr2 locomotives of VR (Finnish Railways) are closely based on the Re 460. They were built by SLM/ABB and later by Adtranz and finally Bombardier Transportation and assembled by Transtech Oy.

==== Norway ====
The 22 NSB El 18 class used by Vy of Norway are closely based on the Re 460. The locomotives were assembled by Adtranz Strømmen in 1996 and 1997.

==== India ====
Indian Railways' WAP-5 electric locomotives are also based on the Re 460, but with major design difference, including a steel body instead of a fiberglass one, and smaller windows protected by bars.

=== Aesthetic inspiration ===
==== China ====
The modified China Railways SS9 electric locomotives follows the aesthetic of the Lok 2000.

=== Retired locomotives ===
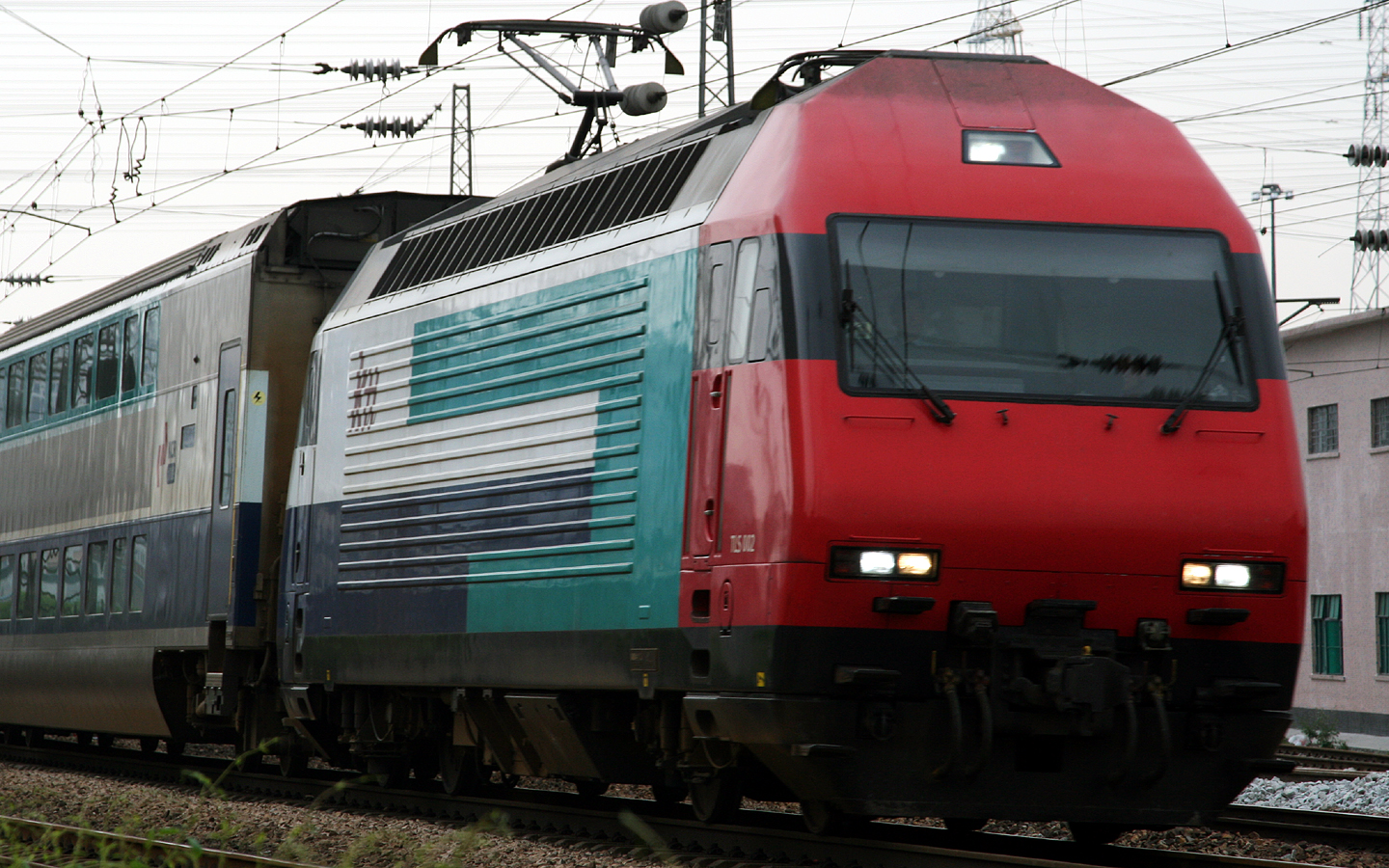
KTT passing through Guangzhou

==== Hong Kong / China ====
The MTR Corporation of Hong Kong also operated two Lok2000 variants for its cross-boundary service from Kowloon, Hong Kong, to Guangzhou, China. They were introduced in 1998 when the service was operated by the KCRC; accordingly, the train is called the KTT, which stands for "KCR Through Train". These long-distance trains had ten double-deck carriages and were equipped with knuckle couplers, instead of buffers and chain couplers. While the train had two locomotives, it was not operated in push-pull mode. The KTT service was cancelled in 2024, following suspension of the service from 2020 owing to the COVID-19 pandemic, as well as the opening of the faster Hong Kong Express Rail Link in 2018. Both locomotives have been in storage since then; however, beginning in January 2025, one locomotive was placed on display at Hung Hom station.

== Accidents and incidents ==
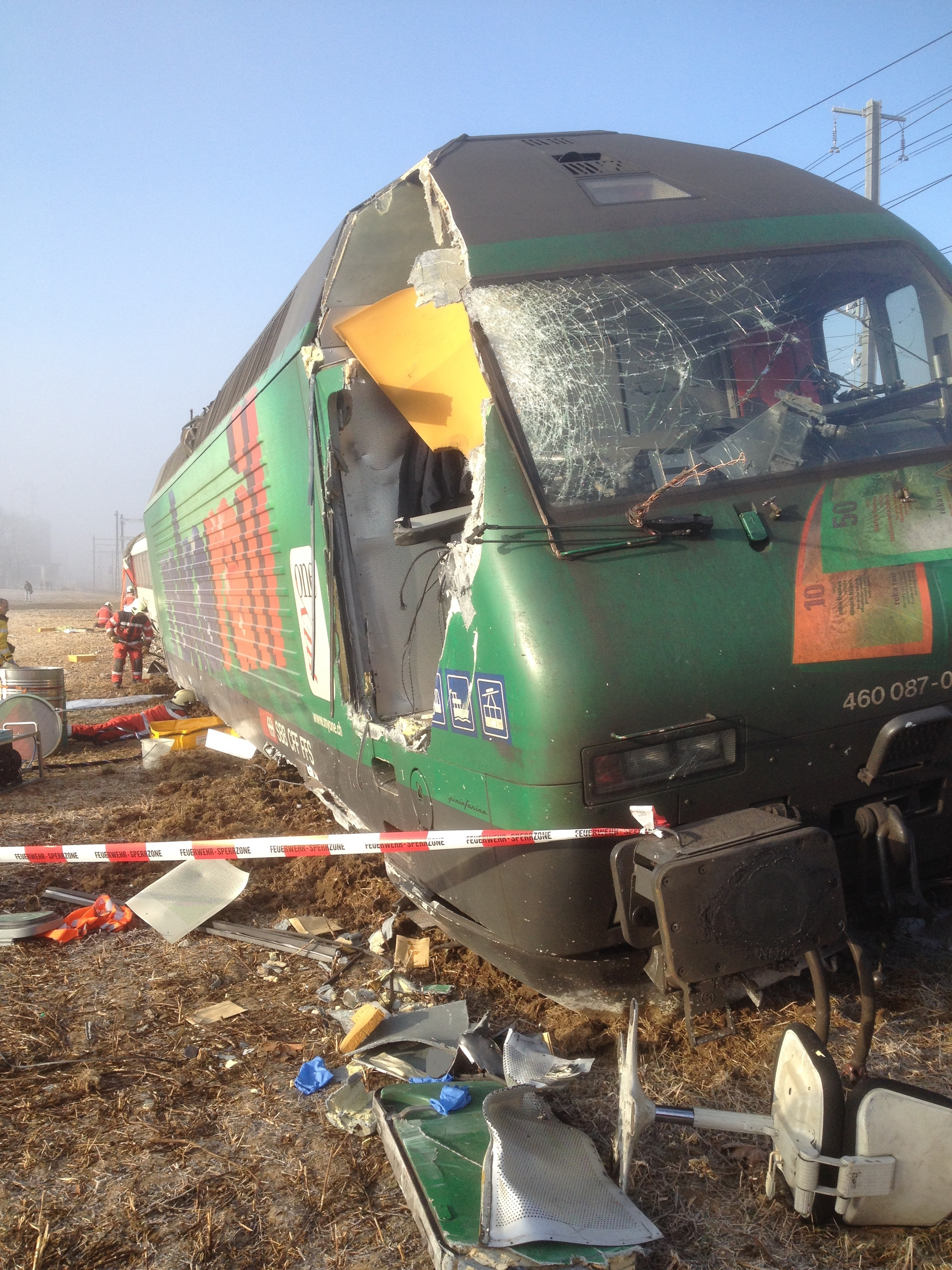
460 087–0 after the accident at Rafz.

On 20 February 2015, locomotive No. 460 087-0 was involved in a collision with S-Bahn Class 514 electric multiple unit 514 146–2 at Rafz.

== See also ==
- List of stock used by Swiss Federal Railways
- Swiss locomotive and railcar classification
