= Mittaggüpfi =

Mountain in Switzerland

- Gnepfstein
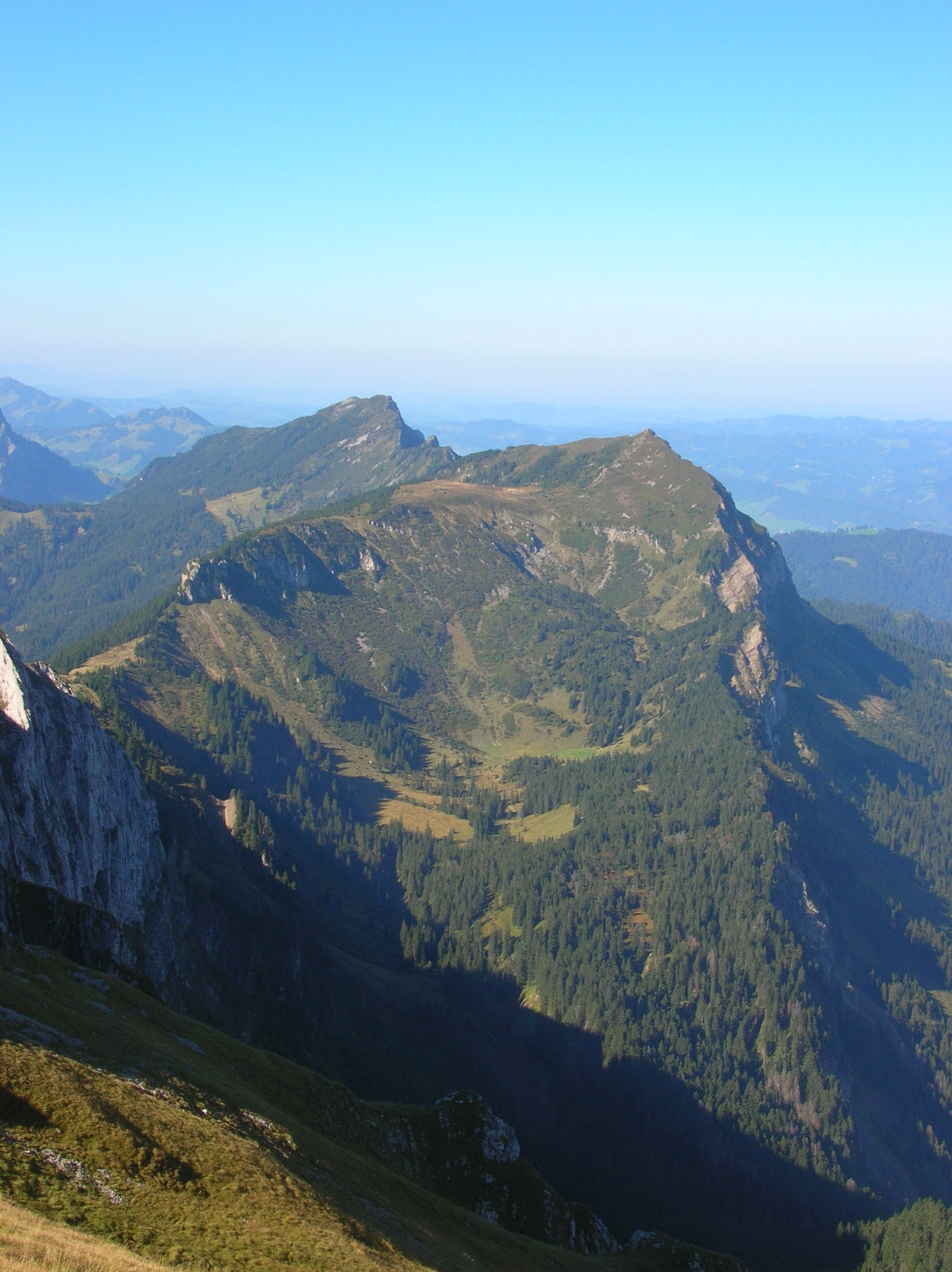
- Mittaggüpfi (right summit) from the east side

Highest point
- Elevation: 1,917 m (6,289 ft)
- Prominence: 167 m (548 ft)
- Parent peak: Stäfeliflue
- Coordinates: 46°58′18″N 8°11′15″E

Geography
- Location within Switzerland
- Location: Lucerne/Obwalden, Switzerland
- Parent range: Emmental Alps

The Mittaggüpfi (also known as Gnepfstein) is a mountain of the Emmental Alps, located west of the mountain of Pilatus on the border between the Swiss cantons of Lucerne and Obwalden.
