= Wachthubel =

Mountain in Switzerland

- Wachthubel

Highest point
- Elevation: 1,415 m (4,642 ft)
- Prominence: 443 m (1,453 ft)
- Parent peak: Schrattenfluh
- Coordinates: 46°50′50″N 7°52′11.5″E

Geography
- Location within Switzerland
- Location: Bern/Lucerne, Switzerland
- Parent range: Emmental Alps

The Wachthubel (1,415 m) is a mountain of the Emmental Alps, located on the border between the Swiss cantons of Bern and Lucerne. The mountain is located between Schangnau and Marbach.
