= Haglere =

Mountain in Switzerland

- Location within Switzerland

Highest point
- Elevation: 1,949 m (6,394 ft)
- Prominence: 365 m (1,198 ft)
- Parent peak: Fürstein
- Coordinates: 46°50′11″N 8°02′33″E

Geography
- Location: Lucerne/Obwalden, Switzerland
- Parent range: Emmental Alps

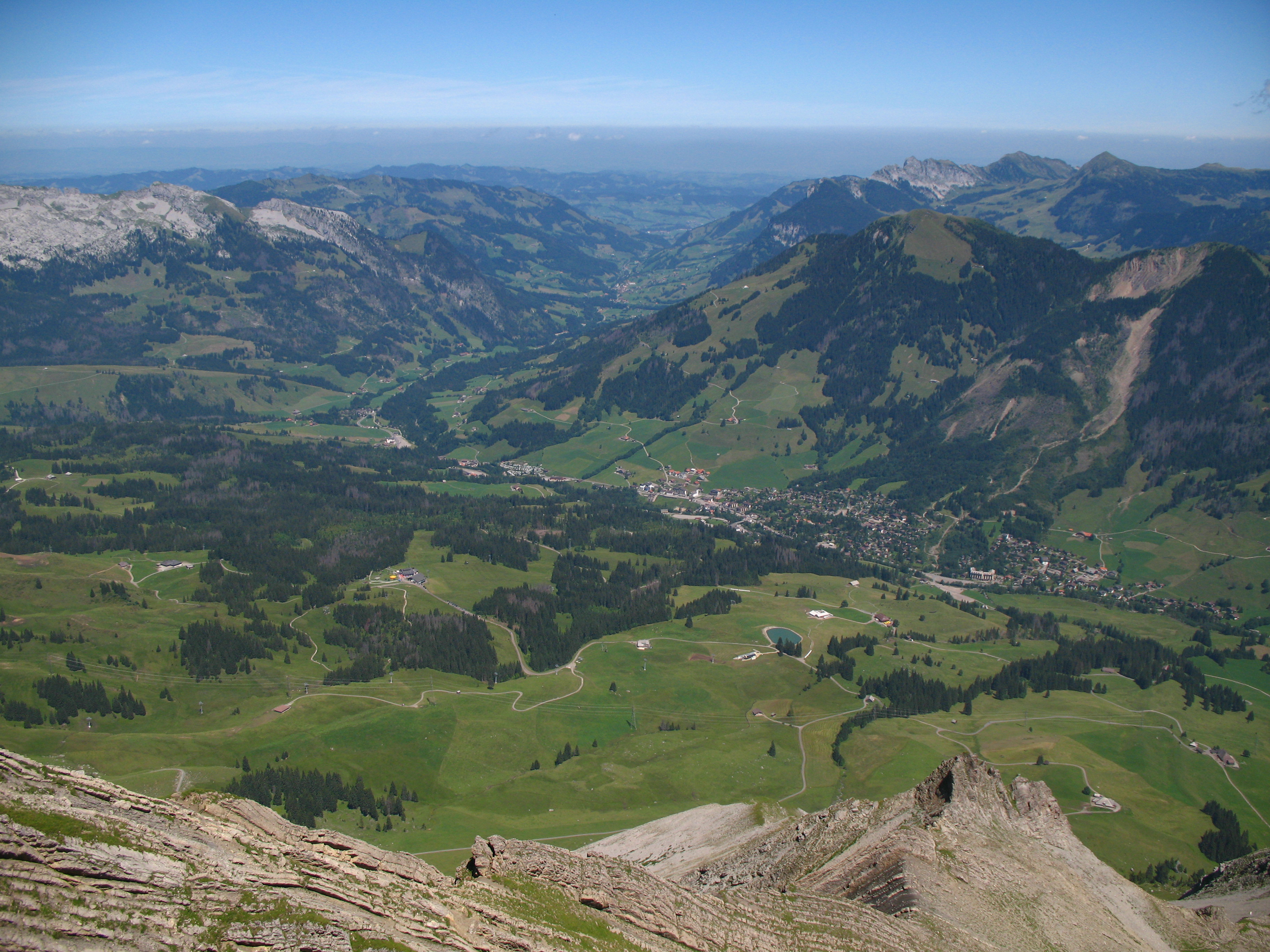

The Haglere or Hagleren is a mountain of the Emmental Alps, located on the border between the cantons of Lucerne and Obwalden. It overlooks Sörenberg on its south side.
