= Sigriswiler Rothorn =

Mountain in Switzerland

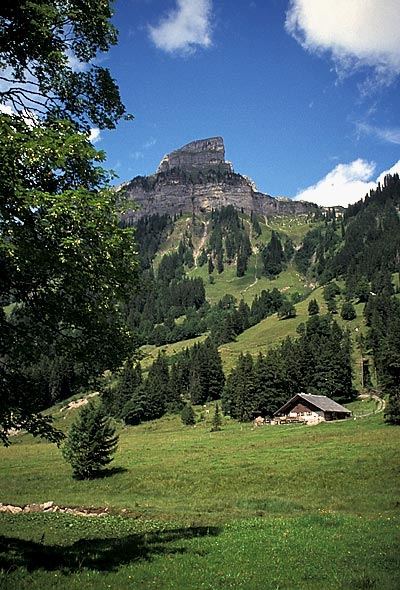
- View from Justistal (east side)

Highest point
- Elevation: 2,051 m (6,729 ft)
- Prominence: 372 m (1,220 ft)
- Parent peak: Burgfeldstand
- Coordinates: 46°43′50″N 7°46′14″E

Geography
- Location within Switzerland
- Location: Bern, Switzerland
- Parent range: Emmental Alps

The Sigriswiler Rothorn is a mountain of the Emmental Alps, located north of Sigriswil in the canton of Bern. With an elevation of 2,051 metres above sea level, it is the culminating point of the chain named Sigriswilergrat.

== Location ==
The ridge is located about 12 km east of Thun. The Sigriswilergrat chain stretches from Lake Thun at Merligen over some 7 kilometres to the northeast to the edge of the Zulgtals. Major peaks are found from the southwest to the northeast including Fluh (1,658 m above sea level), Merra (1,954 m above sea level), Sigriswiler Rothorn (2,051 m above sea level, which is also the highest mountain in the chain), Mittaghorn (2,014 m above sea level), Schaflägerzähne (1,952 m above sea level) and Burst (1,969 m above sea level).

== Geology ==
Sigriswilergrat was formed by the Helvetic System over the course of approximately 160 million years. From a geological point of view Sigriswilergrat was formed of Helvetic sediments, these were deposited between approximately 225 to 66 million years ago.
