= Schafmatt =

Mountain in Switzerland

Highest point
- Elevation: 1,979 m (6,493 ft)
- Prominence: 250 m (820 ft)
- Parent peak: Fürstein
- Coordinates: 46°54′43″N 8°3′48″E

Geography
- Location within Switzerland
- Location: Lucerne, Switzerland
- Parent range: Emmental Alps

The Schafmatt (1,979 m) is a mountain of the Emmental Alps, located north of Flühli in the canton of Lucerne. It lies north of the Fürstein, where the border with the canton of Obwalden runs.
