= Honegg =

Mountain in Switzerland

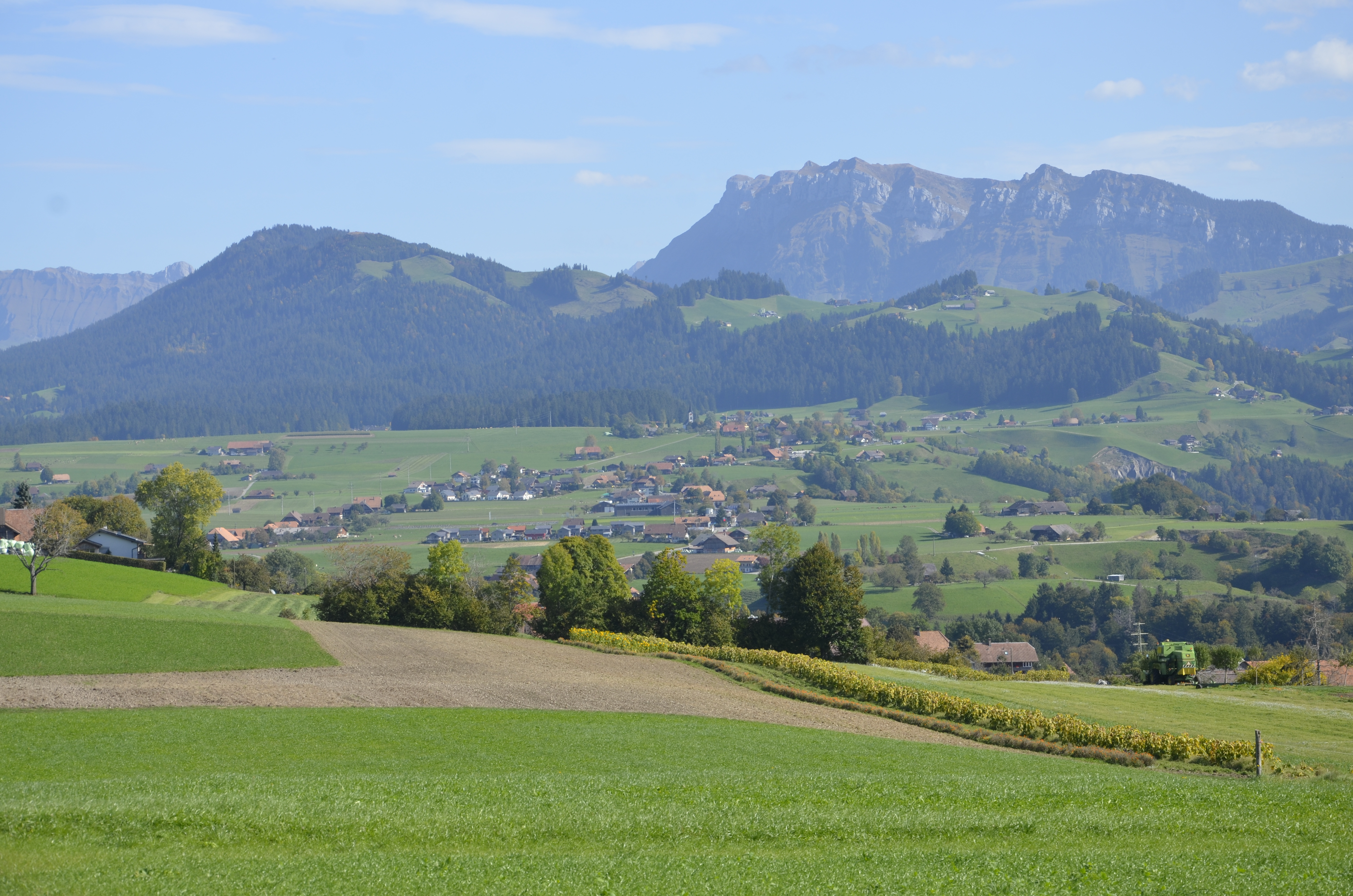
- Honegg on the left, Hohgant behind

Highest point
- Elevation: 1,546 m (5,072 ft)
- Prominence: 356 m (1,168 ft)
- Parent peak: Hohgant
- Coordinates: 46°48′13″N 7°48′14″E

Geography
- Location within Switzerland
- Location: Bern, Switzerland
- Parent range: Emmental Alps

The Honegg is a mountain of the Emmental Alps, located between Schangnau and Eriz in the canton of Bern.
