= Schimbrig =

Mountain in Switzerland

Highest point
- Elevation: 1,815 m (5,955 ft)
- Prominence: 346 m (1,135 ft)
- Parent peak: Brienzer Rothorn
- Coordinates: 46°56′22.7″N 8°6′50.2″E

Geography
- Location within Switzerland
- Location: Lucerne, Switzerland
- Parent range: Emmental Alps

The Schimbrig is a mountain of the Emmental Alps, located in the municipality of Hasle in the canton of Lucerne.

In the nineteenth century a tourist resort was established at the foot of the mountain where a natural sulphur spring surfaces. The resort Schimbrig Bad was successful until it burnt down in a fire in the early twentieth century.
