= Emmental Alps =

Mountain range of the Alps in central Switzerland

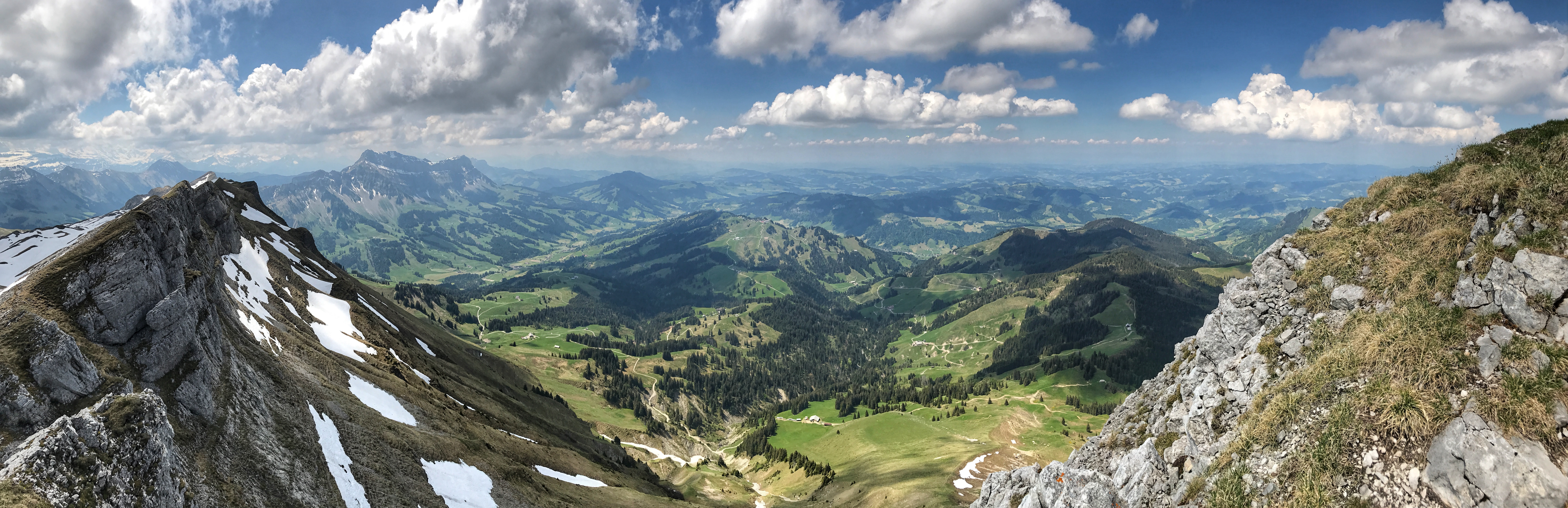
- The Emme valley from the Schrattenfluh

Highest point
- Peak: Brienzer Rothorn
- Elevation: 2,350 m (7,710 ft)
- Coordinates: 46°47′13″N 8°02′49″E

Naming
- Native name: Emmentaler Alpen (German)

Geography
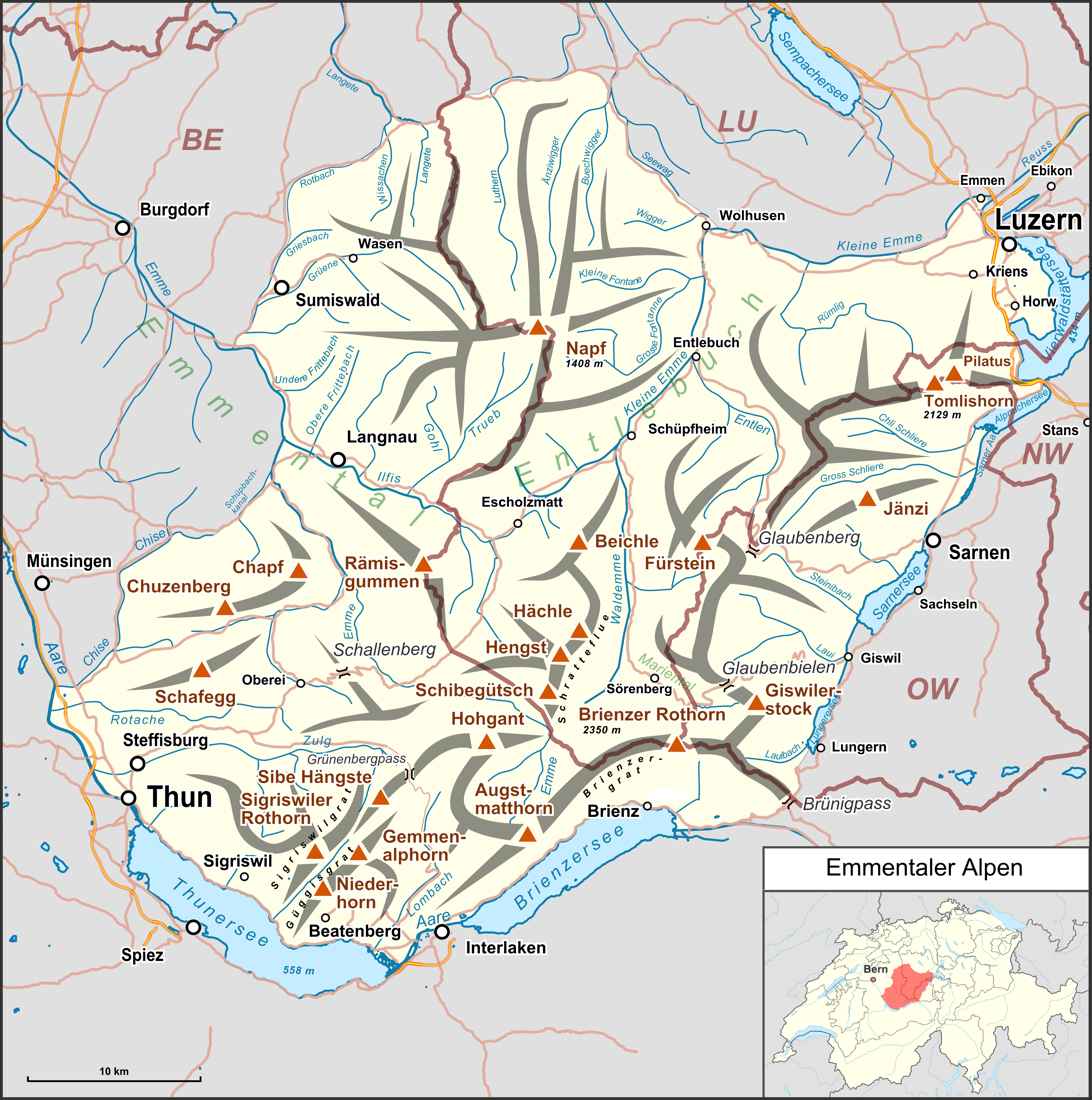
- Country: Switzerland
- Cantons: Bern, Lucerne, Obwalden and Nidwalden
- Range coordinates: 46°47′13″N 8°02′49″E
- Parent range: Western Alps
- Borders on: Bernese Alps, Uri Alps and Schwyz Alps
- Topo map: Swiss Federal Office of Topography swisstopo

The Emmental Alps (German: Emmentaler Alpen) are a mountain range in the western part of the Alps, in Switzerland. They are located north-west of the Brünig Pass, mainly in the cantons of Lucerne, Bern, and Obwalden, with a small portion in the canton of Nidwalden.

The highest summit of the range is the Brienzer Rothorn, which is also the highest point in the canton of Lucerne. The range is named after the Emme valley (German: Emmental). In the north-west corner one finds the relatively low, but widespread, and very furrowed Napf.

The Emmental Alps are separated from the Bernese Alps by the Aare valley to the south and connected to the Uri Alps by the four lakes Lungerersee, Sarnersee, Wichelsee, and Vierwaldstättersee to the east.

== Notable peaks ==
- Brienzer Rothorn (2,350 m)
- Tannhorn (2,221 m)
- Arnihaaggen (2,207 m)
- Höch Gumme (2,205 m)
- Hohgant (2,197 m)
- Augstmatthorn (2,137 m)
- Pilatus (2,128 m)
- Schrattenfluh (2,092 m)
- Widderfeld (2,076 m)
- Burgfeldstand (2,063 m)
- Sigriswiler Rothorn (2,051 m)
- Fürstein (2,040 m)
- Wilerhorn (2,005 m)
- Schafmatt (1,979 m)
- Niederhorn (1,963 m)
- Sieben Hengste (1,955 m)
- Haglere (1,949 m)
- Mittaggüpfi (1,917 m)
- Schimbrig (1,815 m)
- Honegg (1,546 m)
- Wachthubel (1,415 m)
- Napf (1,408 m)
