= Widderfeld =

Mountain in Switzerland

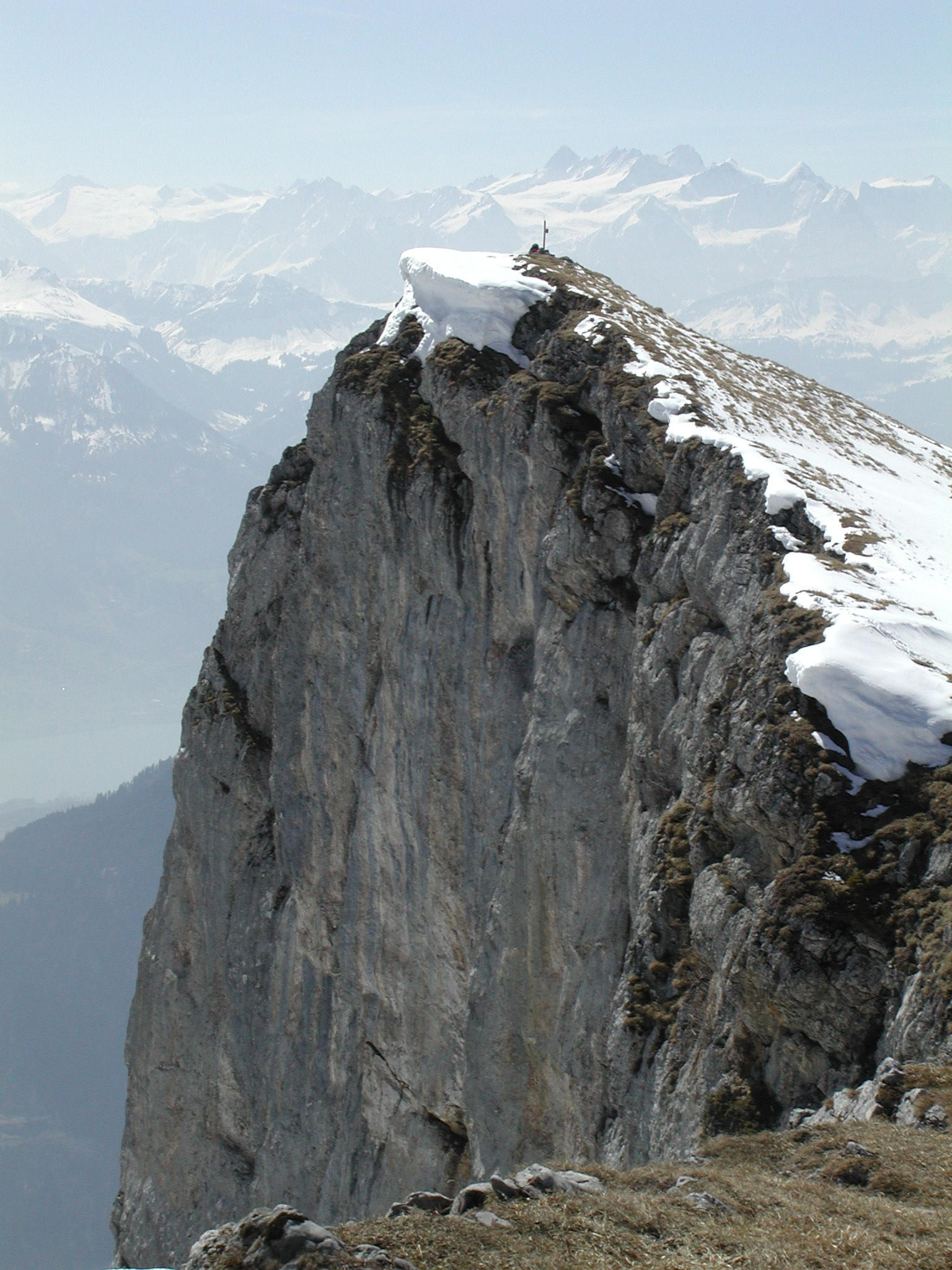
- The summit

Highest point
- Elevation: 2,076 m (6,811 ft)
- Prominence: 77 m (253 ft)
- Parent peak: Pilatus (Tomlishorn)
- Coordinates: 46°58′11.9″N 8°13′43.2″E

Geography
- Location within Switzerland
- Location: Lucerne/Obwalden, Switzerland
- Parent range: Emmental Alps

The Widderfeld is a mountain in the Emmental Alps, located west of the Pilatus in Central Switzerland. The summit lies on the border between the cantons of Obwalden and Lucerne. The tripoint between the cantons of Lucerne, Obwalden and Nidwalden (1,920 m) lies 300 m north of the summit.
