= Stäfeliflue =

Mountain in Switzerland

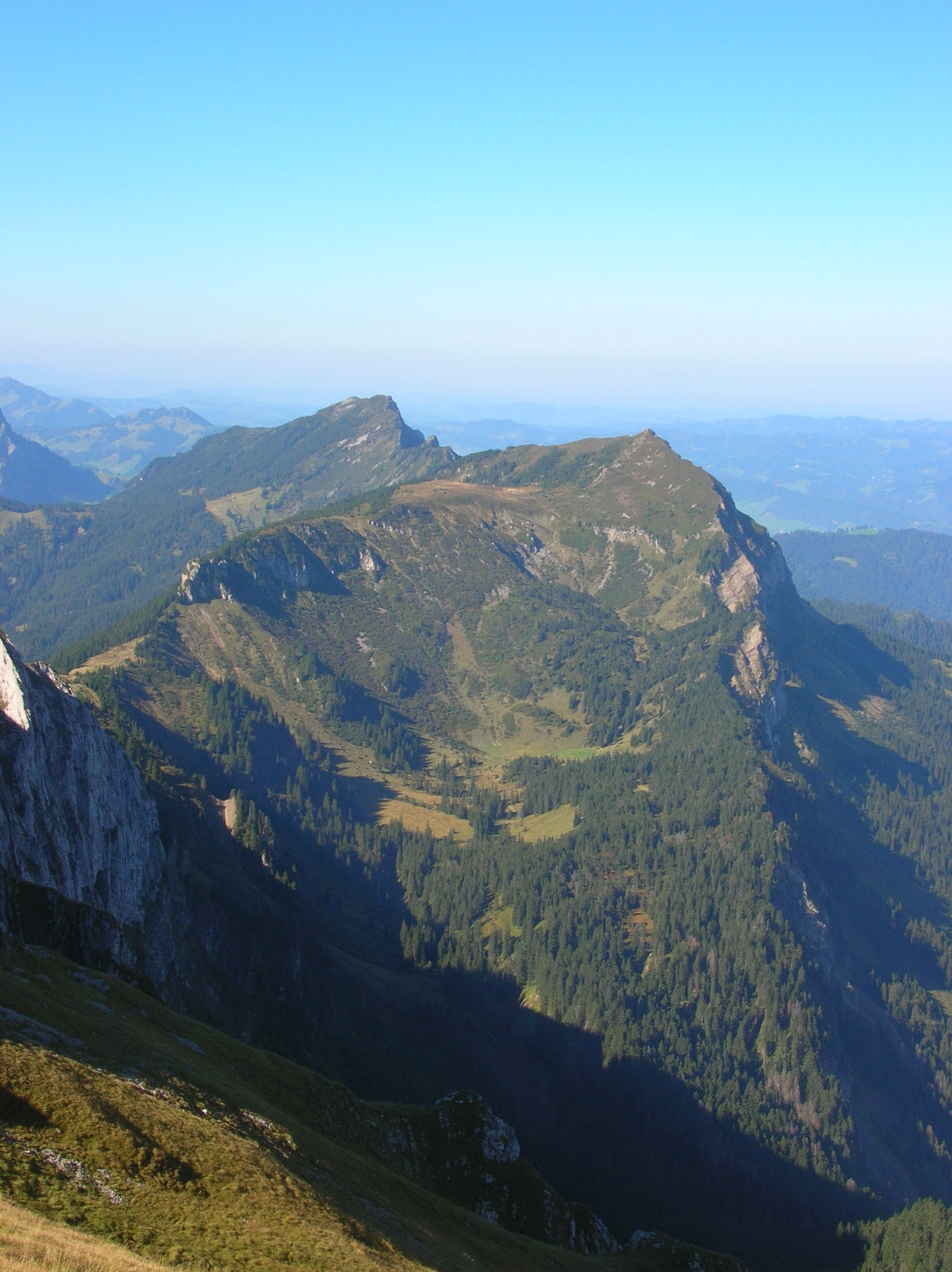
- Stäfeliflue (left summit)

Highest point
- Elevation: 1,922 m (6,306 ft)
- Prominence: 227 m (745 ft)
- Parent peak: Mount Pilatus
- Coordinates: 46°57′52.5″N 8°09′52″E

Geography
- Location within Switzerland
- Location: Lucerne/Obwalden, Switzerland
- Parent range: Emmental Alps

The Stäfeliflue (1,922 m) is a mountain of the Emmental Alps, located on the border between the Swiss cantons of Lucerne and Obwalden.
