= Napf =

Mountain in Switzerland

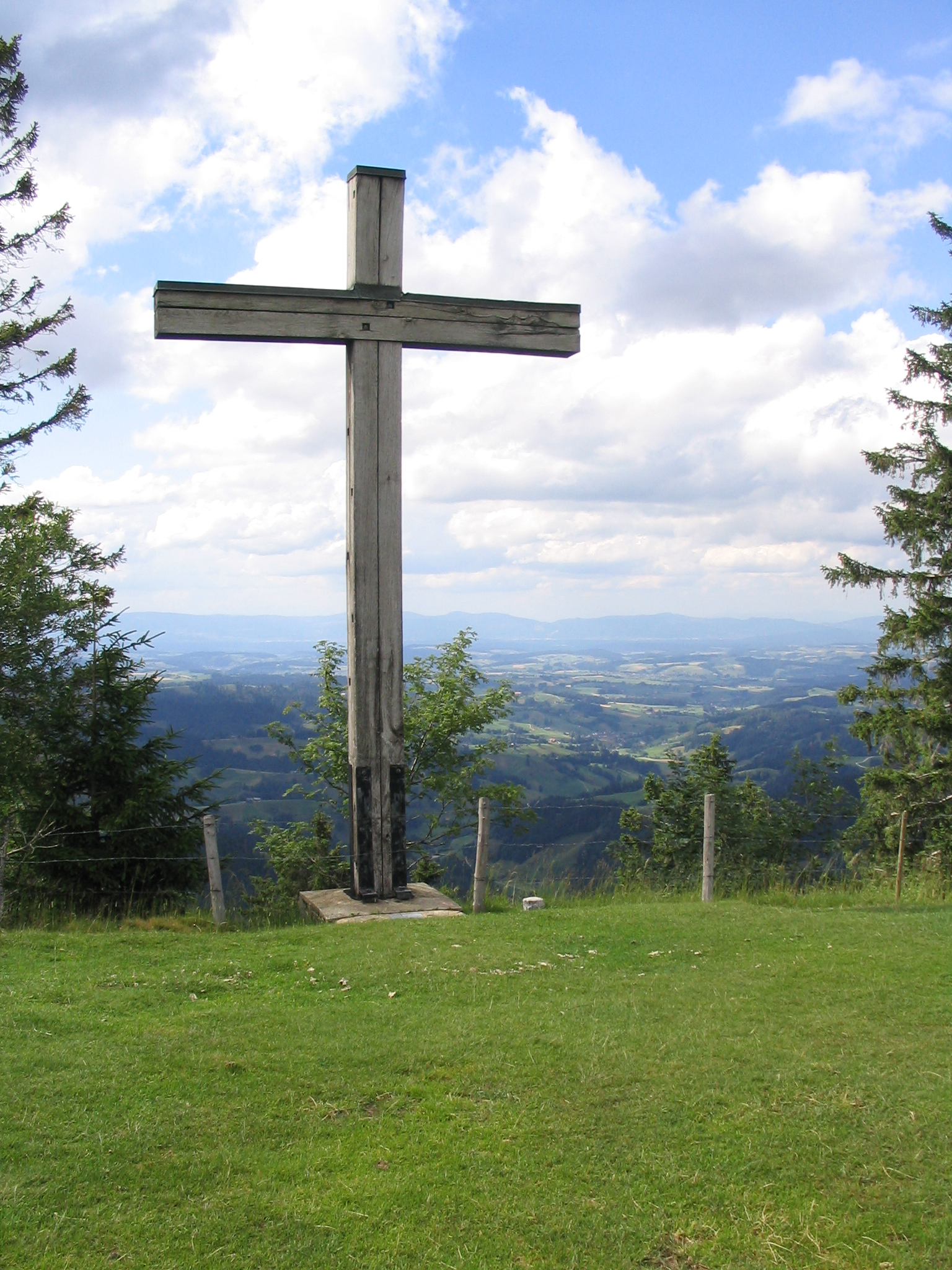
- The summit

Highest point
- Elevation: 1,408 m (4,619 ft)
- Prominence: 552 m (1,811 ft)
- Isolation: 10.5 km (6.5 mi)
- Coordinates: 47°0′15″N 7°56′24″E

Geography
- Location within Switzerland
- Location: Bern/Lucerne, Switzerland
- Parent range: Napfgebiet, Emmental Alps

The Napf is a mountain on the border between the Swiss cantons of Bern and Lucerne. With an altitude of 1,408 meters (4,619 ft), it is the summit of the Napfgebiet (Napf region), the hilly region lying between Bern and Lucerne. It is counted geologically as part of the Swiss Plateau, although it is sometimes considered part of the Emmental Alps. The region is bounded by the Emmental to the south-west and the Entlebuch to the east. The region is traversed by the Brünig-Napf-Reuss line.

The peak is surrounded by steep hills that are a patchwork of evergreen forests and small mountain farms. Nearby towns include Romoos, Doppleschwand, Michlischwand, Luthern, and Menzberg.

== Climate ==
Climate data for Napf, elevation 1,404 m (4,606 ft), (1991–2020)
Month	Jan	Feb	Mar	Apr	May	Jun	Jul	Aug	Sep	Oct	Nov	Dec	Year
Mean daily maximum °C (°F)	1.3 (34.3)	1.0 (33.8)	3.8 (38.8)	7.7 (45.9)	12.1 (53.8)	15.9 (60.6)	18.0 (64.4)	17.6 (63.7)	13.1 (55.6)	9.7 (49.5)	4.8 (40.6)	2.2 (36.0)	8.9 (48.0)
Daily mean °C (°F)	−1.3 (29.7)	−1.6 (29.1)	1.0 (33.8)	4.2 (39.6)	8.3 (46.9)	11.9 (53.4)	13.9 (57.0)	13.9 (57.0)	10.0 (50.0)	6.8 (44.2)	2.2 (36.0)	−0.4 (31.3)	5.7 (42.3)
Mean daily minimum °C (°F)	−3.8 (25.2)	−4.1 (24.6)	−1.7 (28.9)	1.2 (34.2)	5.0 (41.0)	8.6 (47.5)	10.6 (51.1)	10.9 (51.6)	7.4 (45.3)	4.3 (39.7)	−0.1 (31.8)	−2.8 (27.0)	3.0 (37.4)
Average precipitation mm (inches)	98.4 (3.87)	98.3 (3.87)	114.1 (4.49)	125.5 (4.94)	187.8 (7.39)	178.0 (7.01)	188.2 (7.41)	175.6 (6.91)	131.1 (5.16)	118.2 (4.65)	109.7 (4.32)	123.9 (4.88)	1,648.8 (64.91)
Average precipitation days (≥ 1.0 mm)	11.1	10.8	12.5	12.6	15.1	13.8	13.4	12.8	11.2	11.9	11.4	12.7	149.3
Average relative humidity (%)	74	76	78	77	80	80	78	79	84	80	77	75	78
Mean monthly sunshine hours	101.2	103.1	136.1	150.2	153.3	173.5	190.5	184.8	147.8	129.0	94.4	84.2	1,648.1
Percentage possible sunshine	38	37	38	38	35	38	42	44	41	40	35	33	39
Source 1: NOAA
Source 2: MeteoSwiss

== See also ==
- List of mountains of Switzerland
- List of most isolated mountains of Switzerland
