= Burgfeldstand =

Mountain in Switzerland

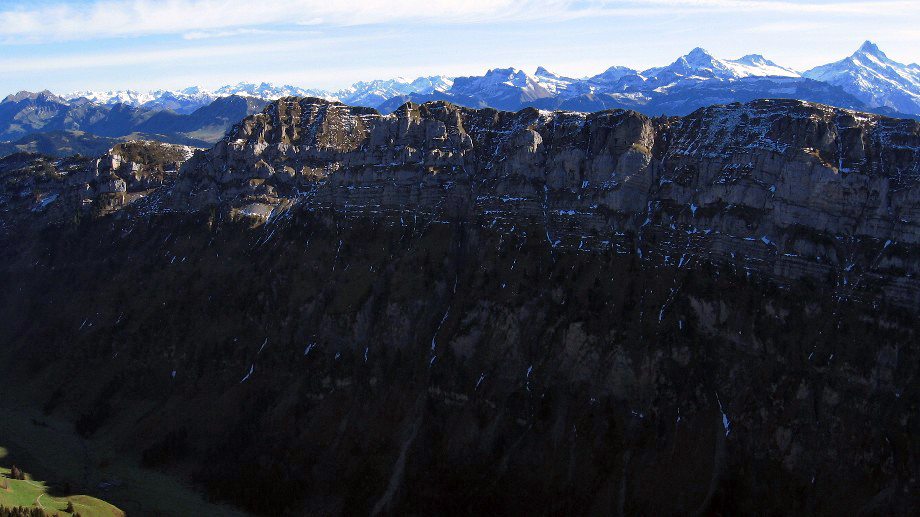
- The Güggisgrat with the Burgfeldstand (right summit)

Highest point
- Elevation: 2,063 m (6,768 ft)
- Prominence: 508 m (1,667 ft)
- Parent peak: Burgfeldstand
- Coordinates: 46°43′20″N 7°47′41″E

Geography
- Location within Switzerland
- Location: Bernese Oberland, Switzerland
- Parent range: Emmental Alps

The Burgfeldstand (elevation 2063 metres) is a mountain of the Emmental Alps, located in the Bernese Oberland near Beatenberg. It is the highest summit of the Güggisgrat. Several trails lead to the top.
