= Swiss Plateau =

Plateau in the European Alps

Coordinates: 47°07′N 7°22′E

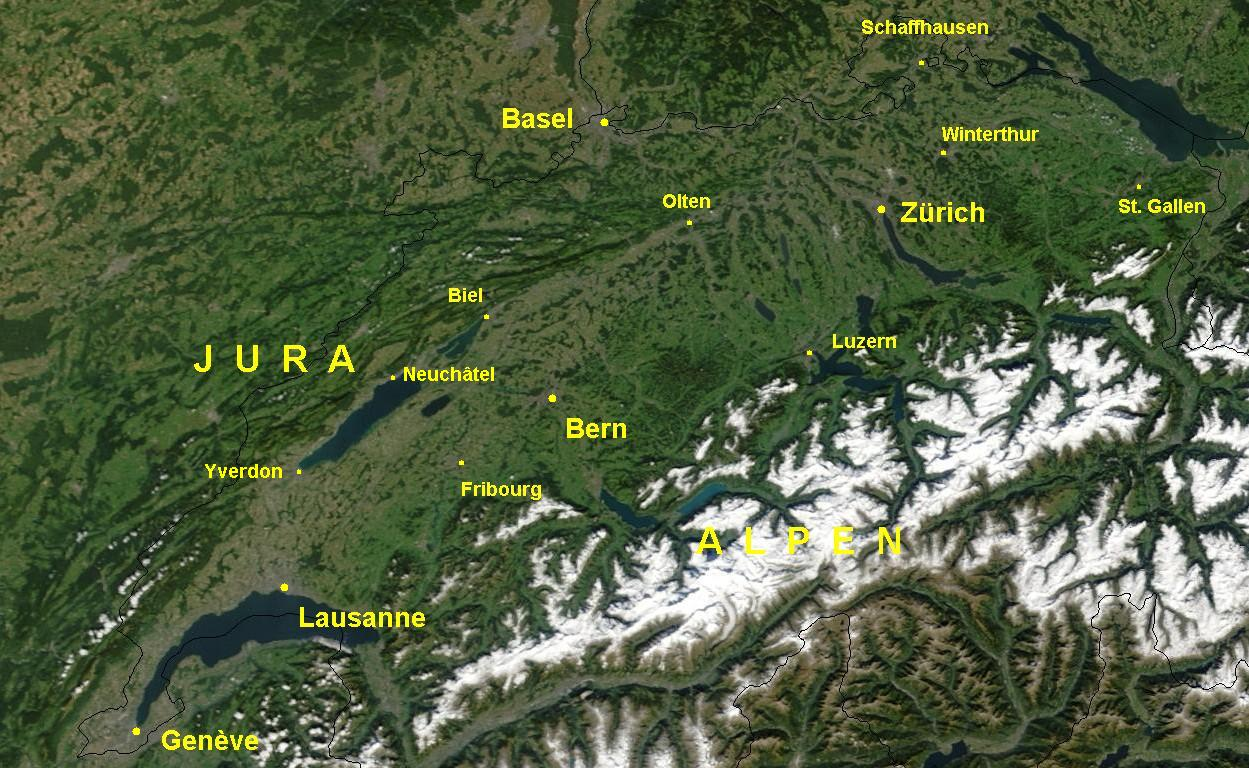
Satellite image of the Swiss Plateau between the Jura and the Alps

The Swiss Plateau or Central Plateau is one of the three major landscapes in Switzerland, lying between the Jura Mountains and the Swiss Alps. It covers about 30% of the Swiss surface area, and is partly flat but mostly hilly. The average height is between 400 metres (1,300 ft) and 700 metres (2,300 ft) AMSL. It is by far the most densely populated region of Switzerland, the center of economy and important transportation.

== Geography ==
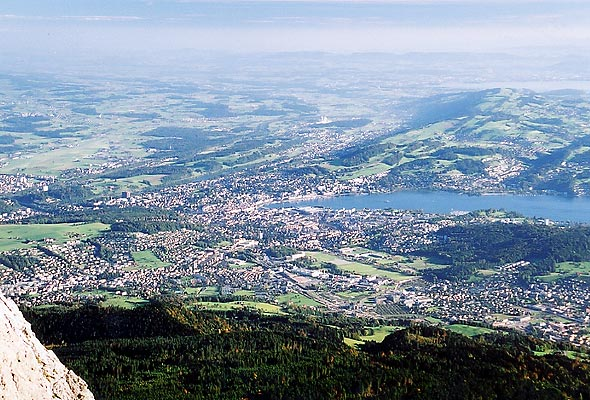
View from the Pilatus on the Swiss Plateau near Luzern

In the north and northwest, the Swiss Plateau is sharply delimited geographically and geologically by the Jura Mountains. In the south, there is no clear border with the Alps. Usually, the rising of the terrain to altitudes above 1500 metres AMSL (lime Alps, partly sub-alpine molasse), which is very abrupt in certain places, is taken as a criterion for delimitation. Occasionally the regions of the higher Swiss Plateau, especially the hills of the canton of Fribourg, the Napf region, the Töss region, the (lower) Toggenburg, and parts of the Appenzell region are considered to form the Swiss Alpine foreland in a narrow sense. However, if a division into the three main regions Jura Mountains, Swiss Plateau and Alps is considered, the Alpine foreland belongs clearly to the Swiss Plateau. In the southwest, the Swiss Plateau is confined by Lake Geneva, in the northeast, by Lake Constance and the Rhine.

Geologically, the Swiss Plateau is part of a larger basin that extends beyond the border of Switzerland. At its southwestern end, in France, the plateau, in the Genevois, ends at Chambéry where Jura and Alps meet. On the other side of Lake Constance, the plateau continues in the German and Austrian Pre-Alps.

Within Switzerland, the Swiss Plateau has a length of about 300 kilometres (190 mi), and its width increases from the west to the east: In the Geneva region, it is about 30 kilometres (19 mi), at Bern about 50 kilometres (31 mi) and in eastern Switzerland about 70 kilometres (43 mi).

Many cantons of Switzerland include a part in the Swiss Plateau. Entirely situated within the Swiss Plateau are the cantons of Zürich, Thurgau and Geneva; mostly situated within the Swiss Plateau are the cantons of Lucerne, Aargau, Solothurn, Bern, Fribourg and Vaud; small portions of the Swiss Plateau are situated in the cantons of Neuchâtel, Zug, Schwyz, St. Gallen and Schaffhausen.

=== Geology ===
==== Geological layers ====
The geological layers of the Swiss Plateau are relatively well known. The base level is crystalline basement which outcrops in the central crystalline Alps as well as in the Black Forest and the Vosges mountain range but forms a deep geosyncline in the Swiss Plateau and in the Jura (see also Jurassic). Around 2500 – 3000 metres below the surface, but considerably deeper near the Alps, the drillings have hit the crystalline basement. It is covered by unfolded strata of Mesozoic sediments, which are part of the Helvetic nappes. Its depth gradually decreases from about 2.5 km in the west to 0.8 km in the east. These layers, like the ones of the Jura Mountains, were deposited in a relatively shallow sea, the Tethys Ocean. Above the Mesozoic layers, is the Molasse, consisting of conglomerate, sandstone, marl and shale. The uppermost layer consists of gravel and glacial sediments that have been transported by the glaciers of the ice ages.

Geologically the most important layer of the Swiss Plateau is the thick molasse sequence that accumulated at the border of the Alps due to the rapid erosion of the concurrently uplifted mountains. The thickness of the molasse increases from west to east (at the same distance from the Alps). The former alpine rivers built huge fans of sediment at the foot of the mountains. The most important examples are the Napf fan and the Hörnli fan; other sedimentary fans exist in the Rigi region, in the Schwarzenburg region and in the region between the eastern lake Geneva and the middle reaches of the Saane/Sarine.

The eroded material has been sorted by grain size. The coarse material was predominantly deposited near the Alps. In the middle of the plateau, there are finer sandstones and near the Jura, clays and marl.

During the Tertiary orogenic uplift, around 60 – 40 million years ago, the area of today's Swiss Plateau was a Karst plateau somewhat inclined to the south. Through processes of rising and lowering that were brought by the folding of the Alps, the area was twice flooded by a sea. The corresponding sediments are distinguished as sea molasse and freshwater molasse, even though the latter consists rather of fluvial and eolian sediments (a kind of mainland molasse).

- Lower sea molasse (around 37 - 30 million years ago): The limestone plateau subsided gradually, and a shallow sea invaded, spreading east to the Carpathian Mountains. The sediments consisted of fine-grained sands, clay and marl. There were no conglomerate fans since the proper Alpine folding began only at the end of that period.
- Lower freshwater molasse (around 30 - 22 million years ago): The sea receded because of uplift, but also because of a worldwide lowering of the mean sea level. The initiation of the Alpine orogeny and subsequent folding and uplift resulted in rapid erosion accompanied by the deposition of the first conglomerate fans.
- Upper sea molasse (around 22 - 16 million years ago): For a second time, a shallow sea invaded. The formation of the conglomerate fans of the Napf and of the Hörnli began.
- Upper freshwater molasse (about 16 - 2 million years ago): The sea receded as the formation of the Napf and Hörnli fans continued (along with other minor fans). At the end of this period, the thickness reached about 1500 meters.

In the following time, the western part of the plateau in particular rose again significantly, so that in this area, the sediments of the upper freshwater molasse and the upper sea molasse have largely eroded.

A characteristic of the sea molasses is fossil snails, shells and shark teeth, whereas in the freshwater molasse, fossils of typical land mammals and former subtropical vegetation (for instance palm leaves) are found.

==== Ice ages ====
The contemporary landscape of the Swiss Plateau has been shaped by the ice age glaciers. During all the known alpine glaciations (Günz glaciation, Mindel glaciation, Riss glaciation and Würm glaciation), huge glaciers penetrated the Swiss Plateau. During the warm interglacials, the glaciers receded to the high alps (sometimes more than today) and subtropical vegetation spread in the plateau.

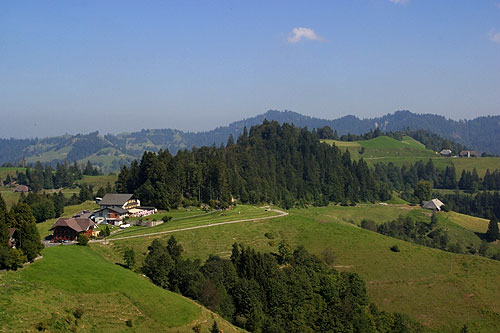
The Napf region in the higher Swiss Plateau

During the ice ages, the Rhône glacier split into two branches when leaving the Alps, covering the whole western Swiss Plateau and reaching today's regions of Solothurn and Aarau. In the region of Bern, it merged with the Aar Glacier. The glaciers of the Reuss, the Limmat and the Rhine advanced sometimes as well towards the Jura. The glaciers formed the land by erosion, but base moraines (very fine stone meal) often several meters thick, and the deposition of gravel by meltwater streams also shaped the land.

Traces of the older Günz and Mindel glaciation are only left in a few places because most have been removed or transferred by the later glaciations. The greatest extent was reached by the glaciers of the Riss glaciation, when the entire Swiss Plateau was covered with ice except for the Napf and Töss regions. Most notable are the traces of the Würm glaciation about 15 000 years ago. The end moraines of different glacial retreats have been conserved.

==== Glacial landscapes ====
A look at a map still reveals the directions where the ice age glaciers ran. The furthest expansion of the Rhône Glacier to the northeast is indicated by way the western Swiss Plateau valleys trend: the valleys of the Broye and the Glâne as well as Lake Murten, Lake Neuchâtel, and Lake Biel all trend northeast, parallel to the Jura and to the Alps. The glaciers of the Reuss and the Limmat have carved the valleys of the central Swiss Plateau trend northwest (among others including the valleys of the Wigger, the Suhre, the Seetal, the Reuss and the Limmat). The Rhine Glacier has mostly left traces that trend west, such as the eastern Swiss Plateau of the Thur Valley and Lake Constance. In certain places, there are characteristic drumlins of the base moraine, often clustered, especially in the highlands of Zürich, in the Hirzel region, in the Lake Constance region and between the Reuss Valley and Lake Baldegg.

Another reminder of the glaciation are glacial erratics which are found all over the Swiss Plateau. These rocks, sometimes of enormous size, are of alien stones, mostly granite and gneiss from the central crystalline Alps. Taken together, they were clues that led to the substantiation of the glaciation theory in the 19th century, since transport by water or by volcanism was physically impossible.

Gravel deposits in the bottoms of the valleys are another testimonial of the glaciation. During the advances and retreats of the glaciers, gravel layers were deposited in the valleys, sometimes quite thick, though most of it eroded in the subsequent interglacials. Therefore, many valleys have characteristic terraces, the lower terraces consisting of Würm glaciation gravel, the higher terraces of Riss glaciation terraces. Sometimes, there is also gravel from older glaciations.

=== Topography ===
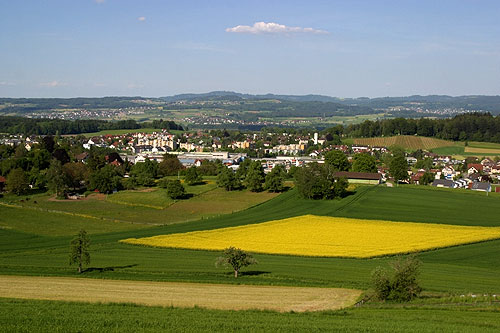
The Swiss Plateau near Muri (AG)

Even though the Swiss Plateau forms a basin, it is by no means a flat territory, but depending on the region, it has a manifold structure. Important elements are the two big lakes, Lake Geneva and Lake Constance that delimit the Swiss Plateau in the southwest and the northeast. The western plateau is stamped by the Gros-de-Vaud plateau (up to 600 meters AMSL) and the Jorat molasse hills (up to 900 meters AMSL) but is sometimes intersected by deep valleys. Near the Jura, there is an almost continuous dip consisting of the Venoge and the Orbe valleys which are separated by the Mormont hill, the main watershed between Rhône and Rhine, at only 500 m AMSL. The Seeland ('lake land'), characterized by the Murten, Neuchâtel and Biel lakes, represents the largest plain of the Swiss Plateau, though it is also interrupted by isolated molasse ranges. In the east, it is neighboured by various hill countries the height of which decreases to the north. Another major plain is the Wasseramt where the Emme runs. In a broad valley alongside the Jura, the Aare collects all the rivers that come down from the Alps.

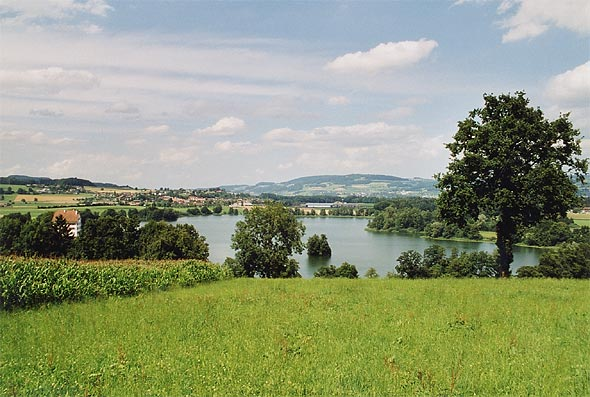
Central Swiss Plateau near Sursee

The central Swiss Plateau is characterised by a number of ranges and broad valleys, some of them with lakes, that run northwest. The last of them is the Albis range, which together with the Heitersberg range forms a bar from the Alps to the Jura. Major transportation routes cross it only in a few places, mostly via tunnels.

The eastern Swiss Plateau is structured by the valleys of the Limmat (including Lake Zurich), the Glatt, the Töss, the Murg, the Thur, and the Sitter. Between them there are hill countries. In the canton of Thurgau there are also the broad molasse ranges of Seerücken (lit.: 'back of the lake') and Ottenberg north of the Thur, and the hilly ranges between the Thur and the Murg. This area is colloquially also known as Mostindien (lit.: 'Cider India').

Two hill countries are out of sync with the above-mentioned landscapes: the Napf region (with 1408 me AMSL the highest point of the Swiss Plateau) and the Töss region (up to 1300 meters AMSL); both are the remains of Tertiary conglomerate sediment fans. Since they were not glaciated, they have only been eroded by water, resulting in a dense net of deep, narrow valleys.

=== Climate and vegetation ===
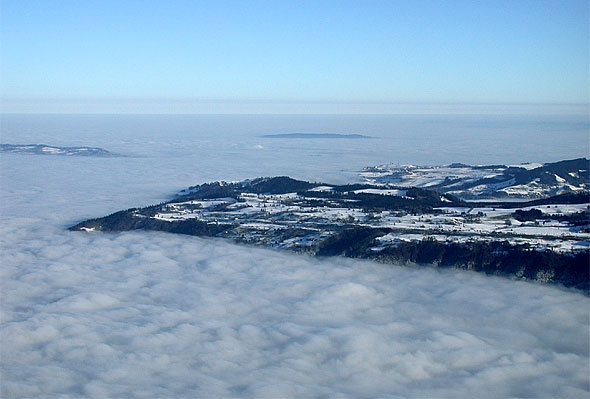
View from the Rigi on the sea of fog covering the Swiss Plateau

The Swiss Plateau is situated within a transition zone between humid oceanic climate and continental temperate climate. The predominant wind comes from the west. In the lower plateau, the mean annual temperature is about 9 – 10 °C. In January, the Lake Geneva region and the watersides of lake Neuchâtel and Lake Biel have the highest mean temperature of about +1 °C. At the same height as AMSL, the temperature is decreasing towards the east. In the Lake Constance region, the mean temperature of the coldest month is -1 °C. In July, the mean temperature of Geneva is 20 °C, alongside the southern edge of the Jura it is 18 – 20 °C, and in higher regions 16 – 18 °C. With regard to mean sunshine duration, the Lake Geneva region is again advantaged with more than 1900 hours, whereas in the rest of the Swiss Plateau, it is between 1600 (especially in the east) and 1900 hours.

The annual average rainfall is between 800 millimetres near the Jura, 1200 millimetres in the higher regions and 1400 millimetres at the edge of the Alps. The driest regions of the plateau are in the lee of the High Jura between Morges and Neuchâtel. In the warmest regions at Lakes Geneva and Neuchâtel, there are less than 20 days with snow cover, whereas, in the rest of the plateau, it is between 20 and 40, depending on elevation.

In the winter half-year, the air on the Swiss Plateau can stay still, with little exchange with the rest of the atmosphere, building a lake of cold air on the plateau and often a ceiling of high fog. The clouds look like an ocean of fog when seen from above (usually around 800m) and hence are called the 'nebelmeer'. This weather phenomenon is called inversion because the temperature below the fog is lower than the temperature above. Sometimes, it lasts for days or even for weeks, during which the neighbouring regions of the Alps and the Jura can have the brightest sunshine. Typical for the high fog is the bise, a cold wind from the northeast. Since it is channelled by the Swiss Plateau narrowing in the southwest, it reaches its major strength in the Lake Geneva region where wind speeds of 60 km/h with top speeds of more than 100 km/h are usual in typical bise weather. The regions near the Alps of the central and eastern plateau sometimes have temperature rises due to the warm foehn wind.

The dominating vegetation in the Swiss Plateau is a mixed broadleaf forest with European beeches and silver firs. For forestry, there are major plantations of Norway spruces in many places, though the Norway spruce naturally only grows in the mountains. In certain favoured spots that are warmer and drier, such as the Lake Geneva region, the Seeland, and the northern plateau between the Aare orifice and Schaffhausen, the predominant trees are oak, tilia and maple.

== Population ==
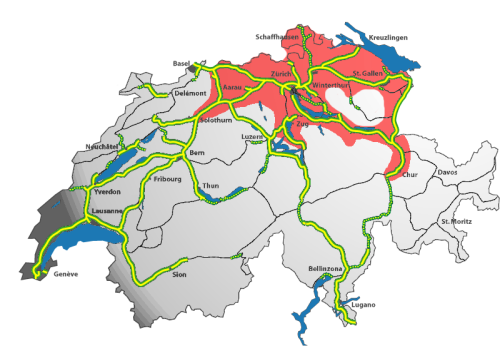
Much of the eastern part of the plateau has become part of the Zürich Metropolitan Area.

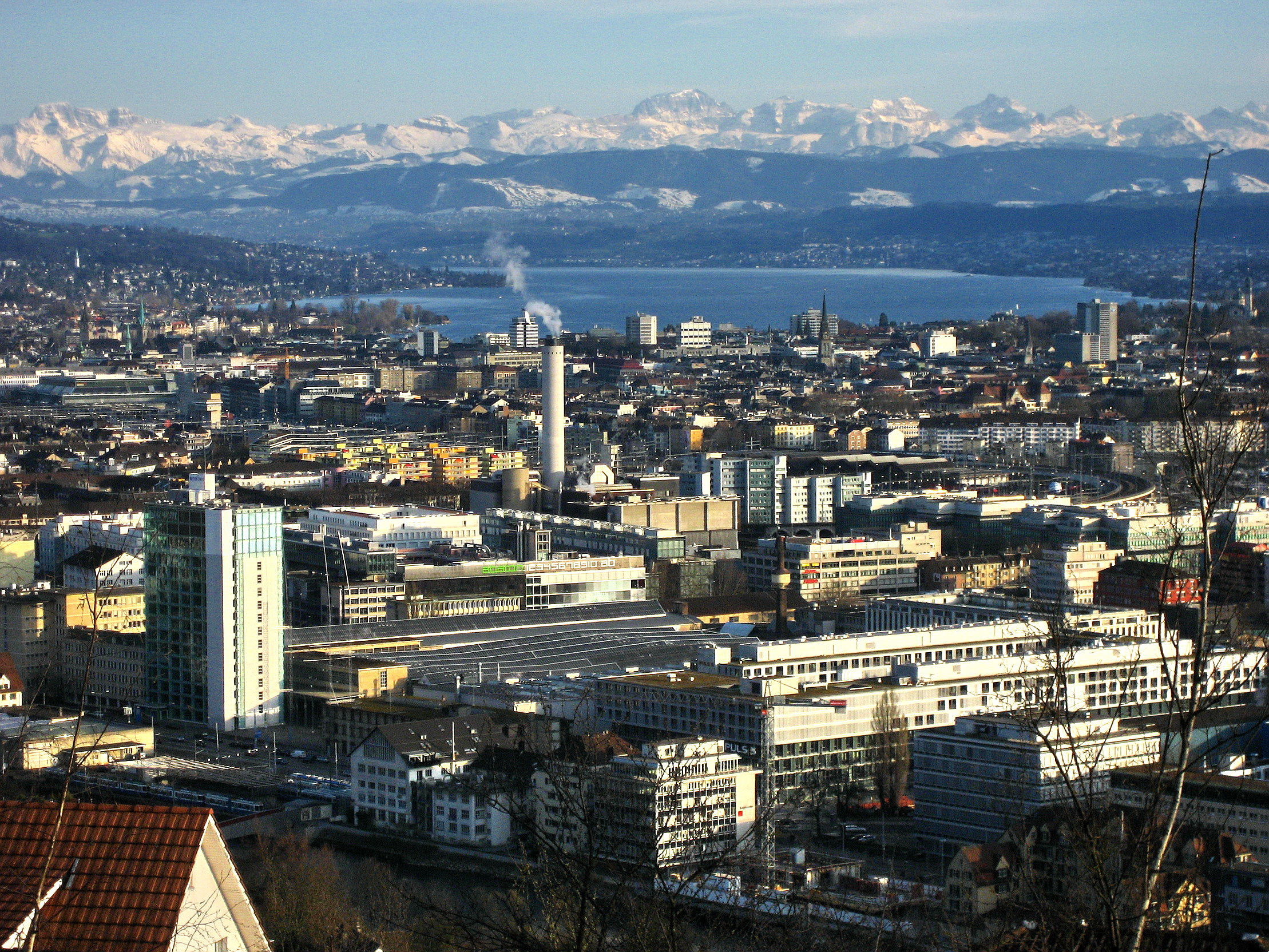
The densely populated Swiss Plateau: view of Zürich from Waidberg

=== History of settlement ===
Humans began to settle the plateau in the Neolithic, starting with the banks of lakes and rivers. Major oppida were built after the Celts appeared in the 3rd century BC. Urban settlements with stone houses were built during the Roman Empire. The Swiss Plateau became a part of the Roman Empire in 15 BC when the Romans occupied the land of the Helvetii under the reign of Augustus, and it remained Roman until the end of the 3rd century. The most important Roman cities in the Swiss Plateau were Auenticum (today Avenches), Vindonissa (today Windisch), Colonia Iulia Equestris or, by its Celtic name, and Noviodunum (today Nyon). They were well connected by a net of Roman roads. After the retreat of the Roman Empire, the romanized Burgundians occupied the western Swiss Plateau, while the Alamanni settled in the central and eastern portions. The language border between French and German dialects originated in this contrast.

During the Middle Ages many towns were founded, especially in the climatically more favoured lower plateau. In 1500 there were already 130 towns, connected by a dense road network. With the rise of industrialisation in the early 19th century, cities became more and more important. In 1860 a drastic population growth of the cities started which lasted for about 100 years. In the 1970s, however, outmigration from the cities started. The municipalities surrounding the cities grew disproportionately, whereas the cities themselves lost inhabitants. In recent times the outmigration has moved farther away from the cities.

=== Today ===
Though the Swiss Plateau takes up only about 30% of the land of Switzerland, 5 million people live there, constituting more than two-thirds of the Swiss population. The population density is 380 people per square kilometre. All the Swiss cities with more than 50,000 inhabitants except Basel and Lugano are situated in the plateau, most notably Bern, Geneva, Lausanne and Zürich. The agglomerations of these cities are the most populous areas. Other densely populated areas are located at the south edge next to the Jura, and the agglomerations of Lucerne, Winterthur and St. Gallen. Regions of the higher Swiss Plateau like the Jorat region, the Napf region or the Töss region are comparatively scarcely populated with little farming villages and scattered farms.

A majority is German-speaking, though the west is French-speaking. The language border has been stable for many centuries even though it falls neither on a geographical nor on a political delimitation. It passes from Biel/Bienne over Murten and Fribourg to the Fribourg Alps. The cities of Biel/Bienne, Murten and Fribourg are officially bilingual. Localities along the language border usually use both names, the German and the French one, officially interchangeable.

== Economy ==
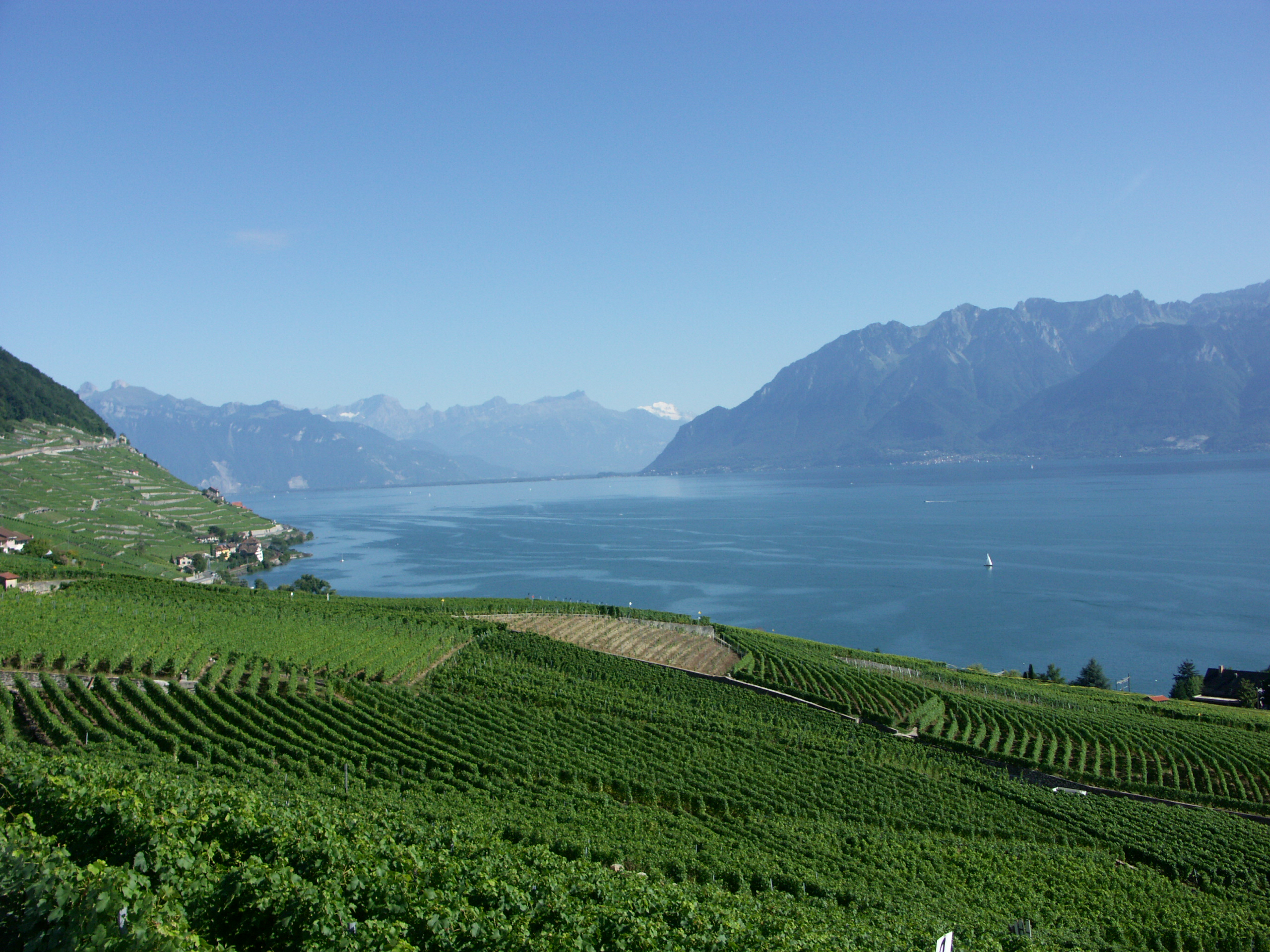
Lavaux and Lake Geneva

Thanks to the favourable climate and fertile grounds, the lower western plateau is the most important agricultural region of Switzerland. The most important cultures are wheat, barley, maize, sugar beet and potato; especially in the Seeland, vegetables are very important, too. Along the northern shores of the lakes of Geneva, Neuchâtel, Bienne, Morat, as well as in the Zürich Weinland and Klettgau, there is viticulture. Grassland with dairy farming and beef production is predominant in the eastern plateau and in the higher regions. Especially in the Thurgau, fruit (apples) is important.

The forests in the Swiss Plateau are used in forestry. There are many Norway Spruce forestations, often in monoculture because of their valuable timber.

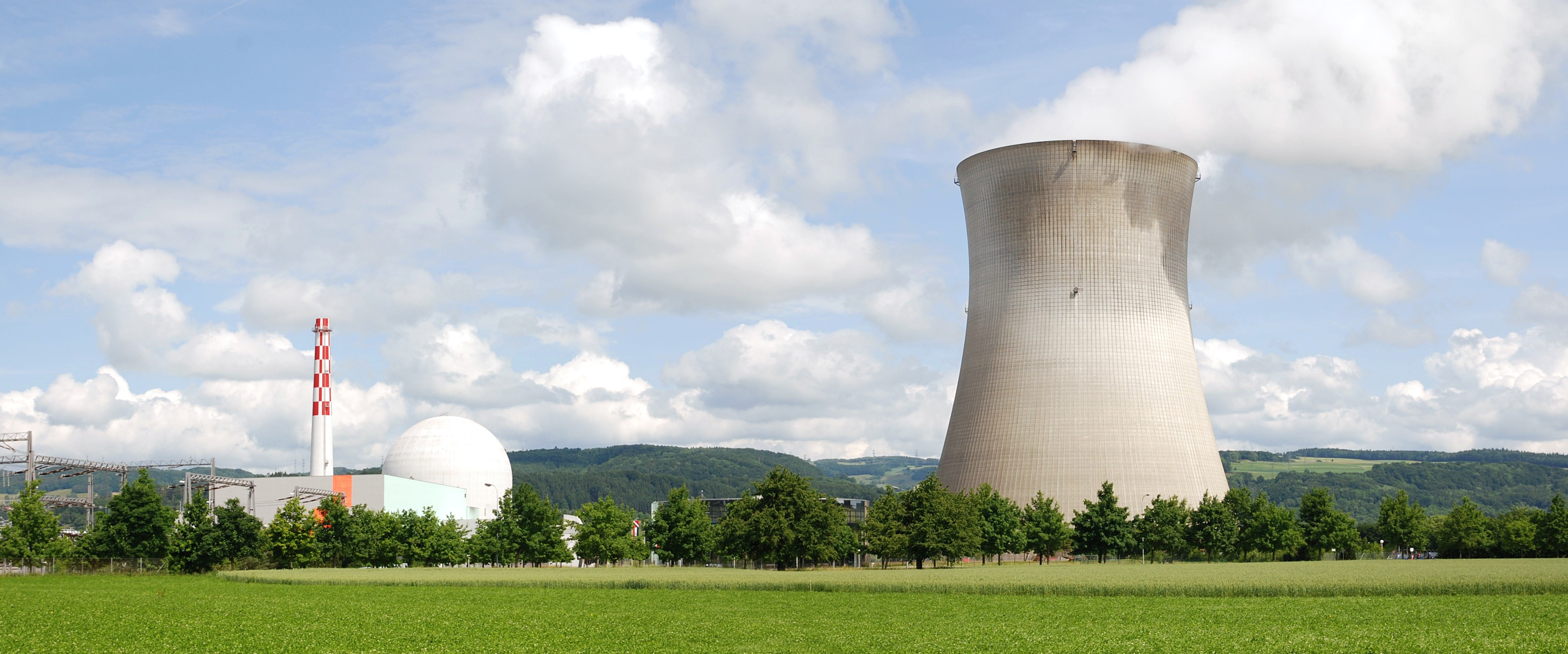
Leibstadt Nuclear Power Plant

With respect to industry, the plateau is the most important region of Switzerland. The traditional textile industries are situated especially in the central and eastern regions. During the last decades, however, it lost importance. Today's most important industries are the machine industry, the automotive industry, the electrical industry, the fine & micro mechanical, watch & electronic industries, next to the optical and metal construction. The food industry processes domestic as well as foreign produces. Furthermore, wood processing and paper converting are also important.

Like all of Switzerland, there are few mineral resources. Thanks to the Ice Age glaciers, there is plenty of gravel and clay. The gravel digging in the Ice Age gravel terraces all over the Swiss Plateau covers the demands of the construction industry.

Numerous hydroelectric power plants in the rivers produce electricity. All four Swiss nuclear power plants are situated on the plateau.

=== Transportation ===
Because of the comparatively easy topography and the dense population, the transport network is highly developed. The most important transversal, so to speak the backbone of the Swiss Plateau, is the A1 motorway that connects all the big cities going from Geneva over Lausanne, Bern, Zürich and Winterthur to St. Gallen. The A2, the Swiss north-south axis, crosses the plateau from Olten to Luzern.

The railway network is very dense. All major cities are connected, and between Olten and Lausanne, there are two main lines: One passing over Bern and Fribourg, the other passing over the edge of the Jura with Solothurn, Biel, Neuchâtel and Yverdon-les-Bains. The train ride from Zürich to Bern takes one hour; crossing the entire Swiss Plateau from St. Gallen to Geneva takes four hours.

The two most important Swiss airports are situated on the plateau, Zurich Airport and Geneva Airport. The de facto capital of Switzerland, Bern, has only a small airport, Bern Belpmoos Airport.

Härkingen respectively Niederbipp and Zürich are scheduled as one of the eight hubs of the proposed Cargo Sous Terrain, an underground cargo transport system those first phase of about 70 kilometres (43 mi) is planned by the early 2030s.

=== Tourism ===
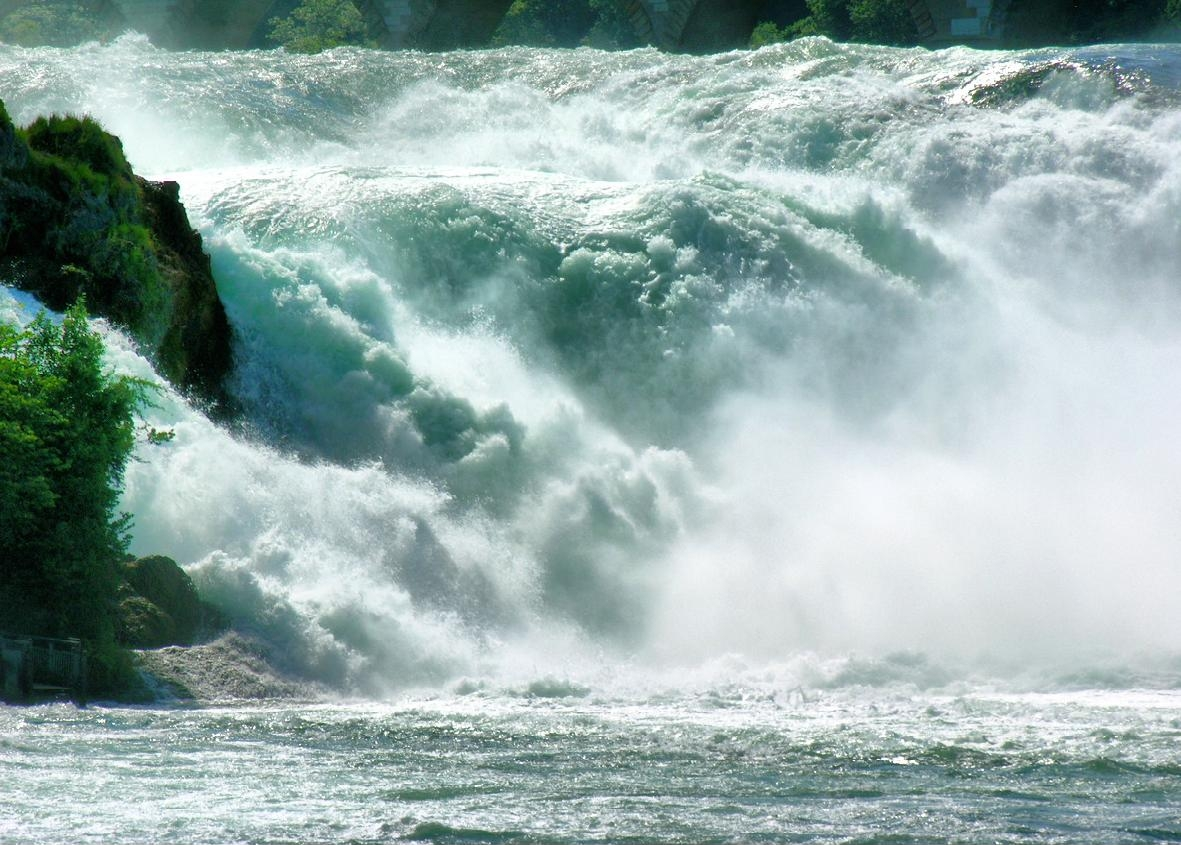
The Rhine Falls

Compared to the Swiss Alps, the plateau, and especially the rural plateau, is less geared towards tourism. It serves as a transit region. Visitors mainly come to see the major towns and cities with their historical sights and attractions, especially the Old Towns of Bern and Lucerne, but also Zürich, Biel/Bienne, St. Gallen, Fribourg, Geneva and Lausanne. An important natural touristic attraction is the Rhine Fall near Schaffhausen. The lakes also attract tourists, and then there are several spa towns, Baden, Schinznach-Bad, Yverdon-les-Bains and Zurzach, thanks to their hydrothermal vents.

Zürich Wilderness Park is the largest mixed deciduous and coniferous forest in the plateau, and includes the Sihl forest and Langenberg, the oldest Swiss wildlife park. The park covers approximately 12 square kilometres (4.6 sq mi).

== See also ==
- Brünig-Napf-Reuss line
- History of Switzerland

== Literature ==
- Toni P. Labhart: Geologie der Schweiz. Ott Verlag, Thun, 2004. ISBN 3-7225-6762-9.
- François Jeanneret und Franz Auf der Maur: Der grosse Schweizer Atlas. Kümmerly + Frey, Geographischer Verlag, Bern, 1992. ISBN 3-259-08850-4.
- Andre Odermatt und Daniel Wachter: Schweiz, eine moderne Geographie. Neue Zürcher Zeitung, Zürich, 2004. ISBN 3-03823-097-9.
