= Fürstein =

Mountain in Switzerland

- Fürsteinfrom the Wasserfallenegg

Highest point
- Elevation: 2,040 m (6,690 ft)
- Prominence: 481 m (1,578 ft)
- Parent peak: Brienzer Rothorn
- Coordinates: 46°53′44″N 8°4′11″E

Geography
- Location within Switzerland
- Location: Lucerne/Obwalden, Switzerland
- Parent range: Emmental Alps

The Fürstein is a mountain of the Emmental Alps, located on the border between the cantons of Lucerne and Obwalden.

The closest locality is Flühli, on the western side.
