= Schrattenfluh =

Mountain in Switzerland

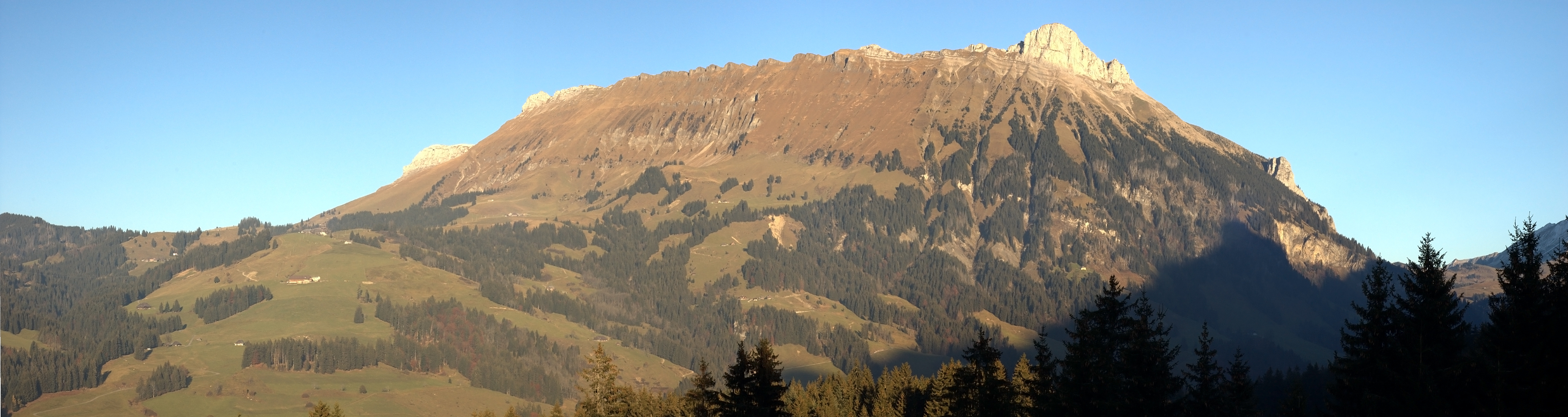

Highest point
- Peak: Hengst
- Elevation: 2,092 m (6,864 ft)
- Prominence: 776 m (2,546 ft)
- Parent peak: Brienzer Rothorn
- Coordinates: 46°50′03.7″N 7°57′27.8″E

Geography
- Location within Switzerland
- Location: Lucerne, Switzerland
- Parent range: Alps

The Schrattenfluh (also spelled Schrattenflue) is a mountain of the Swiss Alps, located in the upper Emmental, in the canton of Lucerne. The Schrattenfluh is composed of several summits of which the highest (2,092 m (6,864 ft)) is named Hengst.

== Pictures ==
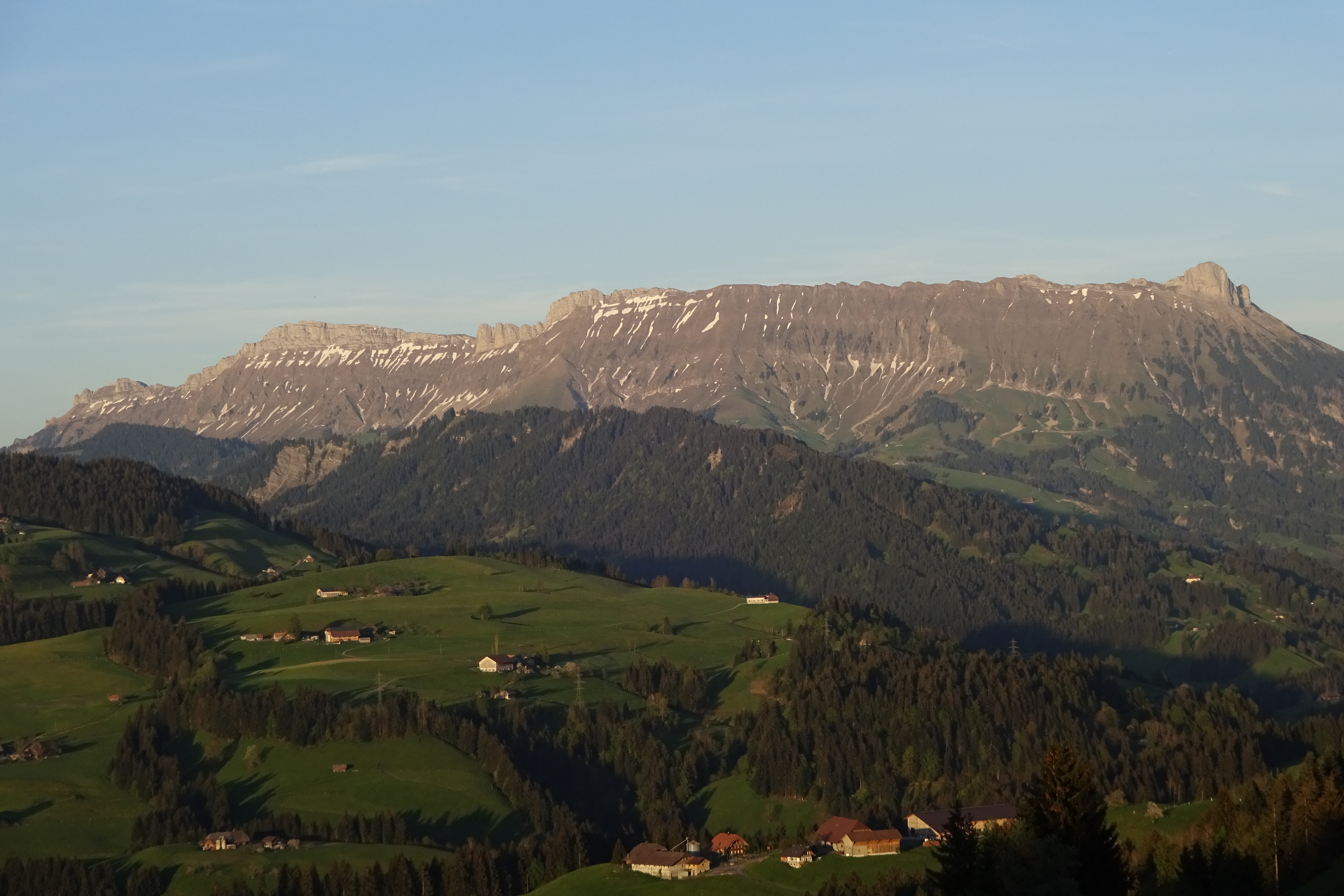
Schrattenfluh northwest face: Strick, Hächlen, Hengst & Schybengütsch

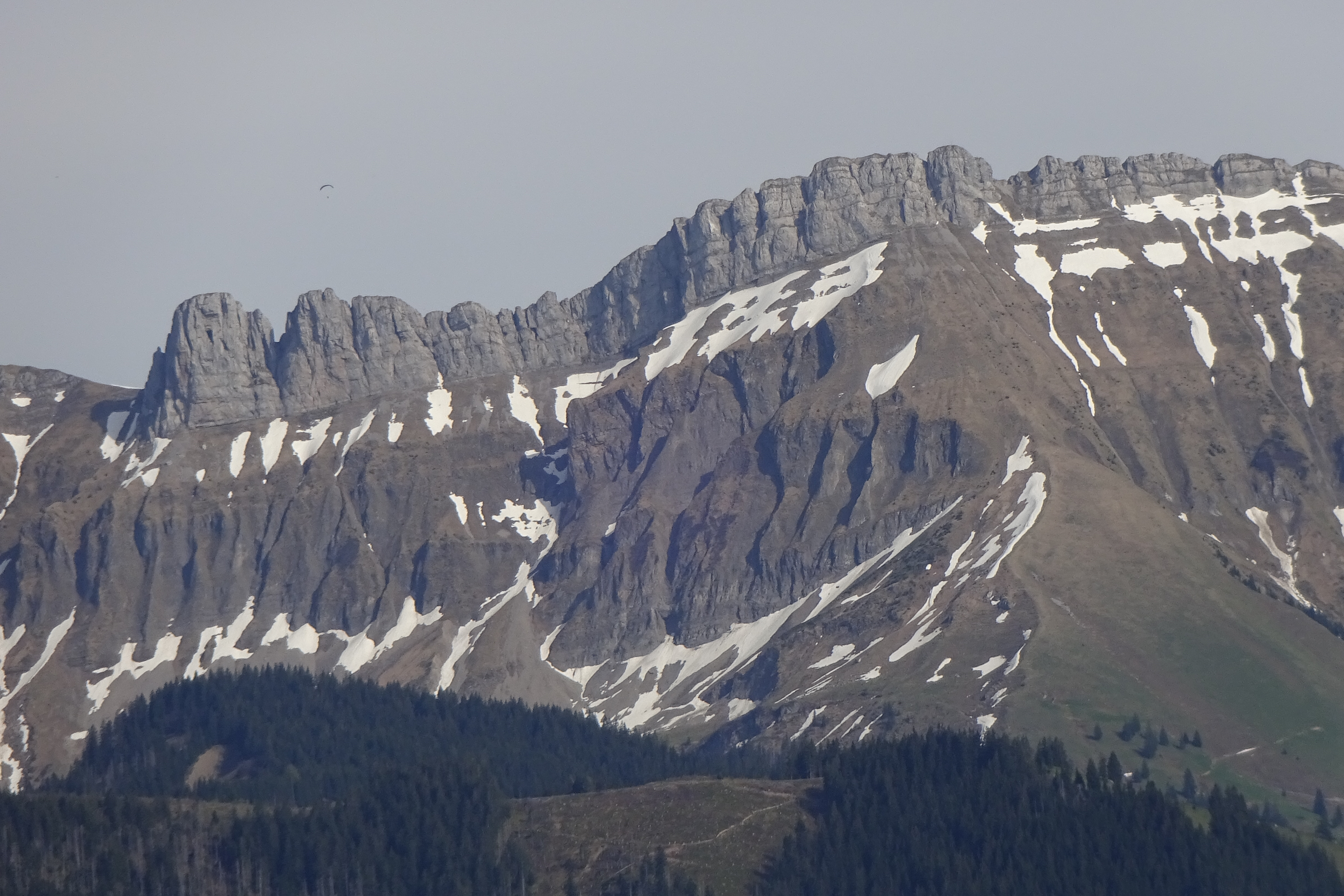
Schrattenfluh northwest face: Hengst

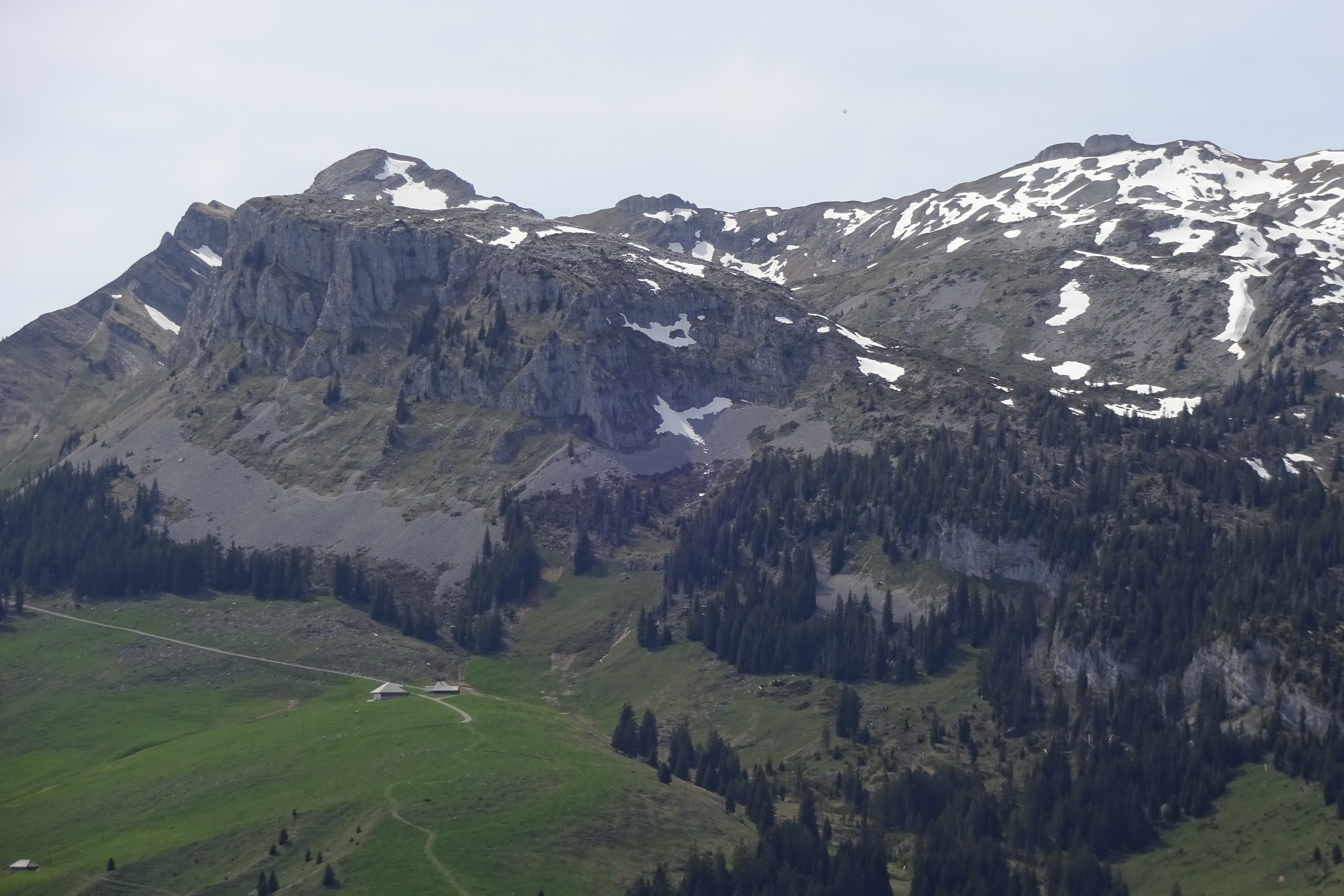
Schrattenfluh southeast face: Schybengütsch & Türstenhäuptli

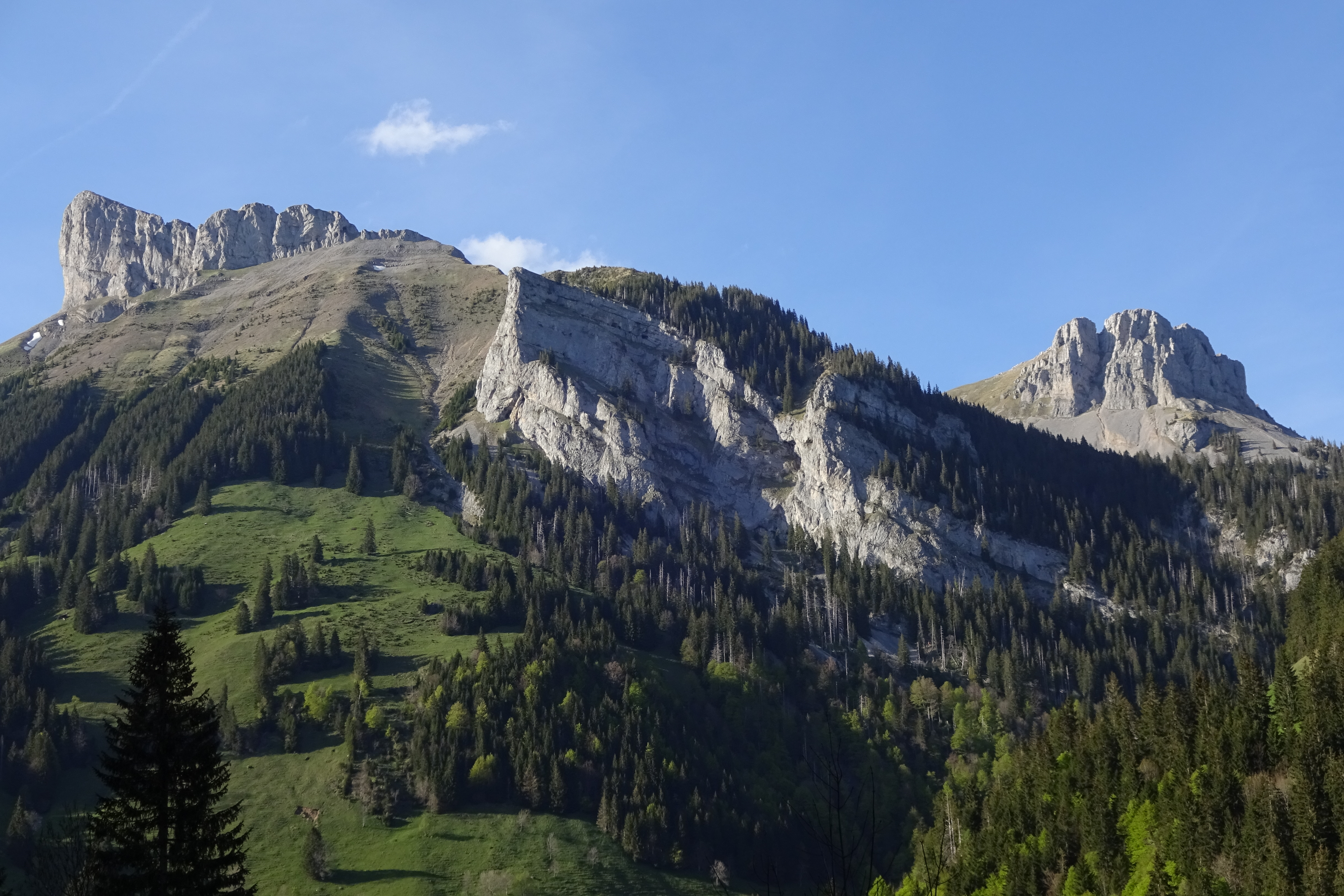
Schrattenfluh south face: Schybengütsch, Achs & Böli
