= Schluchberg =

Mountain in Switzerland

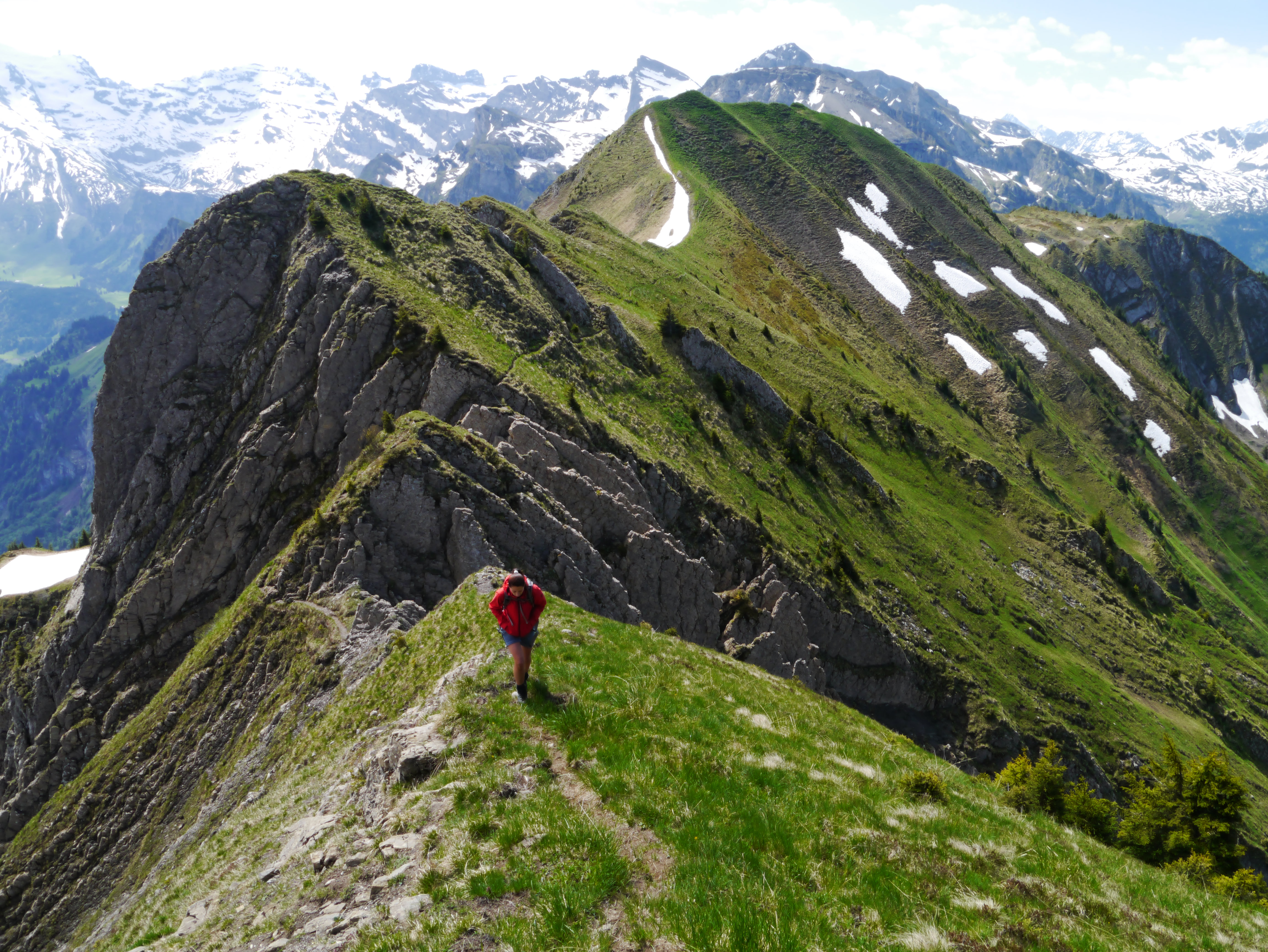

Highest point
- Elevation: 2,106 m (6,909 ft)
- Prominence: 364 m (1,194 ft)
- Parent peak: Widderfeld Stock
- Coordinates: 46°52′00″N 8°20′02″E

Geography
- Location within Switzerland
- Location: Obwalden/Nidwalden, Switzerland
- Parent range: Uri Alps

The Schluchberg (2,106 m) is a mountain of the Uri Alps, located on the border between the Swiss cantons of Obwalden and Nidwalden. It is the highest summit of the chain north of the Storegg pass.
