= Widderfeld Stock =

Mountain in Switzerland

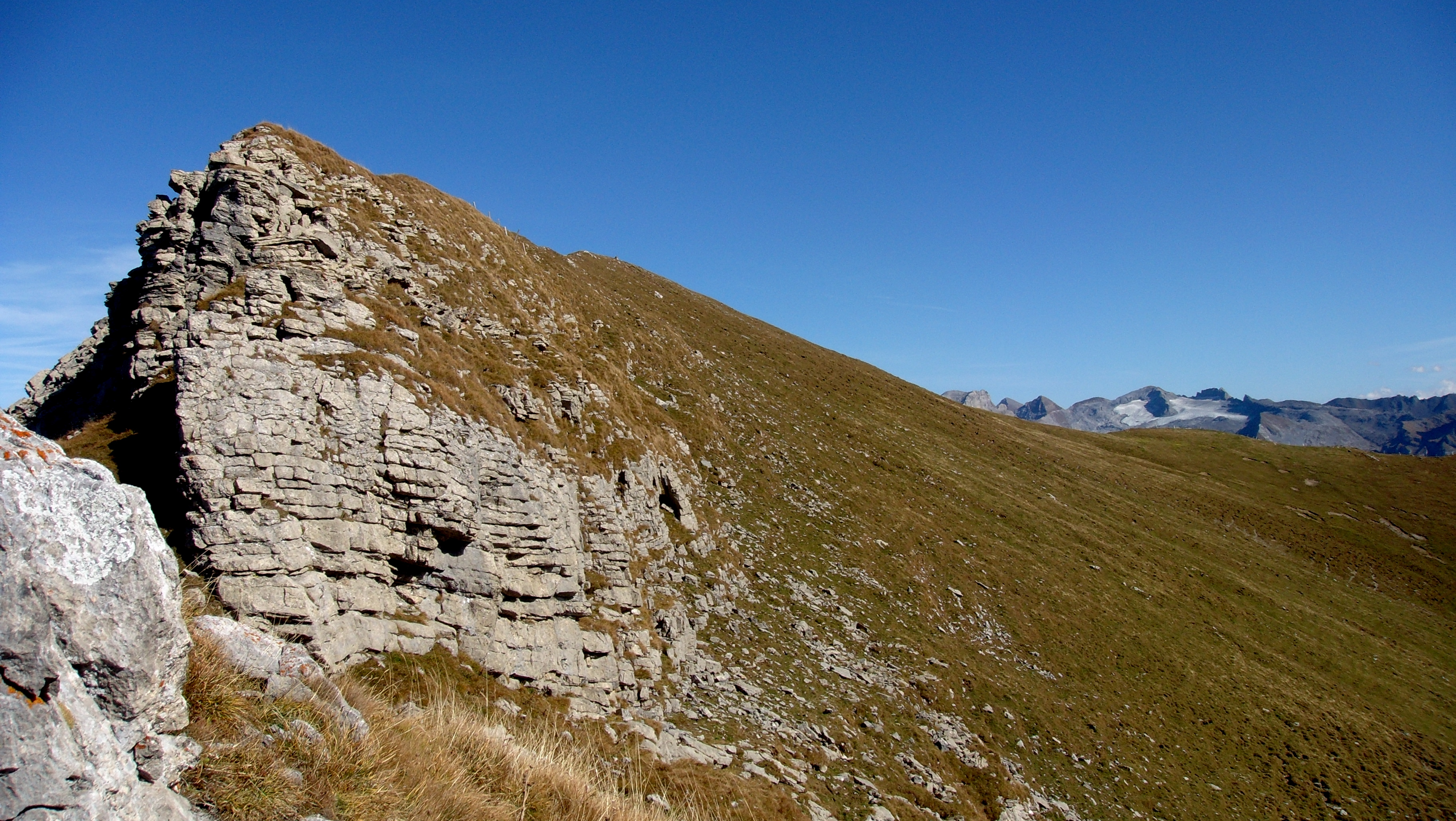
- Widderfeld Stock.

Highest point
- Elevation: 2,351 m (7,713 ft)
- Prominence: 147 m (482 ft)
- Parent peak: Nünalphorn
- Coordinates: 46°50′01″N 8°19′57″E

Geography
- Location within Switzerland
- Location: Nidwalden/Obwalden, Switzerland
- Parent range: Urner Alps

The Widderfeld Stock is a mountain of the Urner Alps, located on the border between the Swiss cantons of Nidwalden and Obwalden. It is located between the valleys of Melchtal and Engelberg.
