= Verkehrshaus-Lido landing stage =

Ferry terminal in Switzerland

Verkehrshaus-Lido
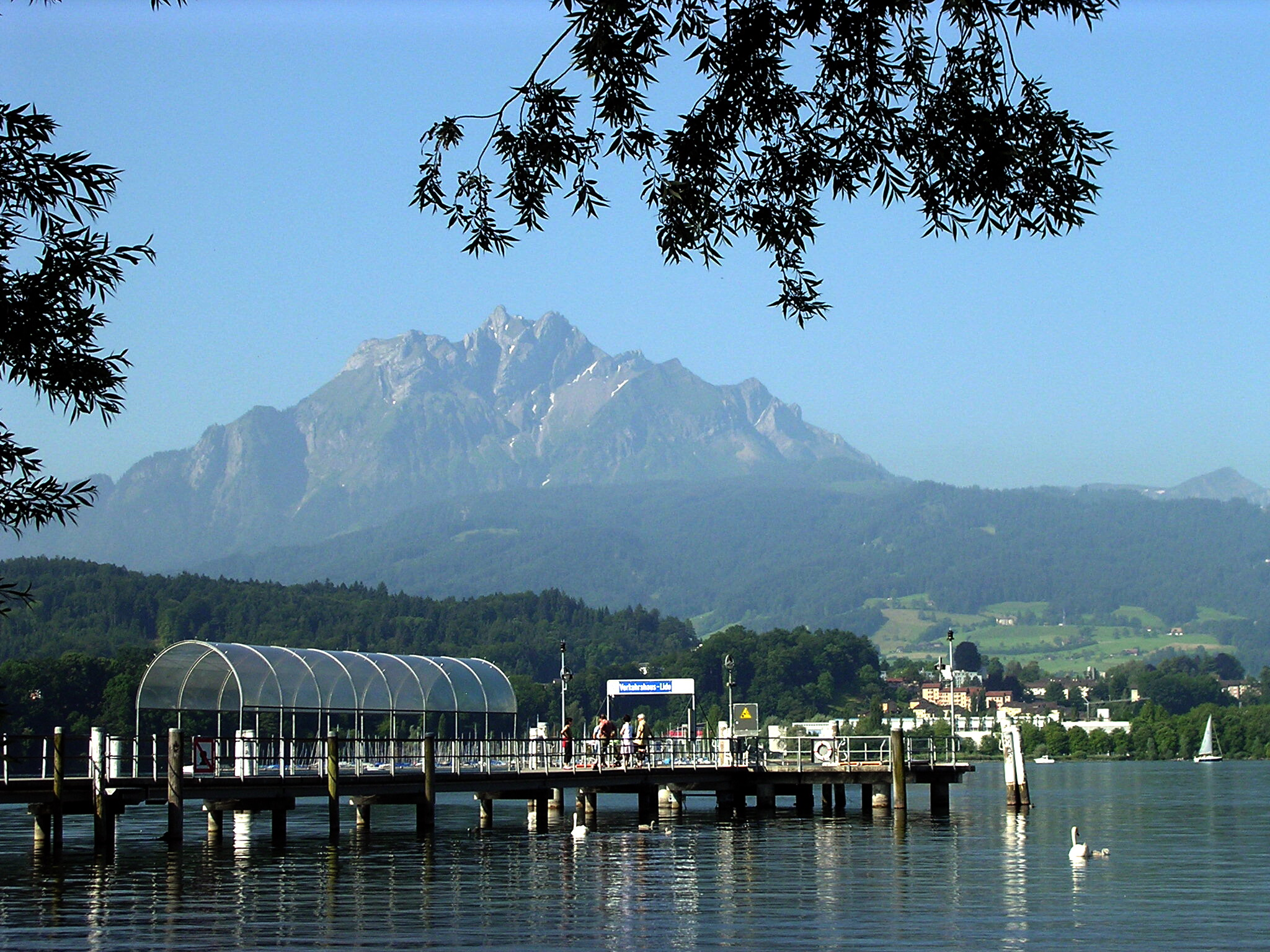
- The terminal in 2005 with Pilatus in the background

General information
- Location: Lucerne; Switzerland
- Coordinates: 47°03′04″N 8°20′05″E
- Elevation: 435 m (1,427 ft)
- Owner: Lake Lucerne Navigation Company
- Platforms: 1 pier

Other information
- Fare zone: 10 (Passepartout)

Services
Preceding station	Lake Lucerne Navigation Company	Following station
Luzern Bahnhofquai Terminus	Lucerne–Küssnacht am Rigi	Meggen towards Küssnacht am Rigi
Luzern Bahnhofquai Terminus	Lucerne–Flüelen	Hertenstein towards Flüelen
Luzern Bahnhofquai Terminus	Lucerne–Alpnachstad	Kastanienbaum towards Alpnachstad
Tribschen towards Luzern Bahnhofquai	Lucerne–Meggenhorn	Seeburg towards Meggenhorn
Location

Verkehrshaus-Lido landing stage is a landing stage in the city of Lucerne, Switzerland. It is located on Lake Lucerne, across the bay from main part of Lucerne. It is served by the Lake Lucerne Navigation Company. The port is adjacent to the Swiss Museum of Transport (German: Verkehrshaus der Schweiz); rail connections are available at Luzern Verkehrshaus railway station, on the far side of the museum.

== Services ==
As of the December 2020 timetable change, the following services stop at Verkehrshaus-Lido:

- Lake Lucerne Navigation Company:
  - hourly service between Luzern Bahnhofquai and Brunnen; some ships continue from Brunnen to Flüelen.
  - during the summer months, five round-trips per day between Luzern Bahnhofquai and Alpnachstad
  - during the summer months, three round-trips per day between Luzern Bahnhofquai and Küssnacht am Rigi
  - during the summer months, three round-trips per day between Luzern Bahnhofquai and Meggenhorn
