= Mettler & Salz =

- Founded: Bern, Switzerland
- Founder: Mettler and Georges Salz
- Country of origin: Switzerland
- Headquarters location: Bern
- Publication types: Books, journals
- Nonfiction topics: science and freethought
- Fiction genres: prose

Mettler & Salz was a Swiss publishing house. It was founded in the 20th century by Mettler and Georges Salz, and was based in Tscharnerstrasse 14 a in Bern. It contributed to spread freethought in Switzerland during the Interwar period and World War II by publishing mainly novels, monographs and scientific literature.

== Publishing program ==
As an academic publisher, Mettler & Salz was specialized in humanities natural sciences. The publishing house also served Georges Salz as a self-publishing house for his travel literature. Mettler & Salz published during 18 years the organ of the Freethinkers Association of Switzerland. It published specialized freethought books by Leo Heinrich Skrbensky and Ernst Akert, and with Hans Moehrlen's novel Between Two Worlds (1942) it also published fictional literature.
