= Hans Erni =

Swiss painter and engraver

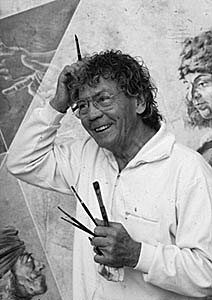
- 1967
- Born: February 21, 1909; Lucerne, Switzerland
- Died: March 21, 2015 (aged 106); Lucerne, Switzerland
- Occupations: Painter and sculptor

Hans Erni (February 21, 1909 – March 21, 2015) was a Swiss graphic designer, painter, illustrator, engraver and sculptor.

Born in Lucerne, the third of eight siblings, to a cabin cruiser engineer, he studied art at the Académie Julian in Paris and later in Berlin, and admired artists such as Pablo Picasso and Georges Braque.

He is known for having illustrated postage stamps, his lithographs for the Swiss Red Cross, his participation on the Olympic Committee as well as his activism. His 1939 works and first major public success was a mural titled Switzerland: "Vacation Land of the People" was commissioned and displayed for the national exhibition in Zürich.

The Hans Erni Museum, situated in the grounds of the Swiss Museum of Transport in Lucerne, contains a large collection of artwork, he also designed ceramics and theatre costumes and sets. He did the art for Swiss bank notes, in the 1940s but, after the notes were already printed they were never published, because a member of the State Council of Lucerne criticized that Erni was deemed as a communist. However, Erni was never a member of any political party. In 2004, he was awarded the honorary citizenship of the city of Lucerne. On 10 January 2009 he received the SwissAward for lifetime accomplishment.

In his career he created about 300 posters and several murals — including ones for the 1980 Salon international de l'automobile, Red Cross, IOC, United Nations and ICAO.

He illustrated about 200 books and created 90 postage stamps and 25 medals.

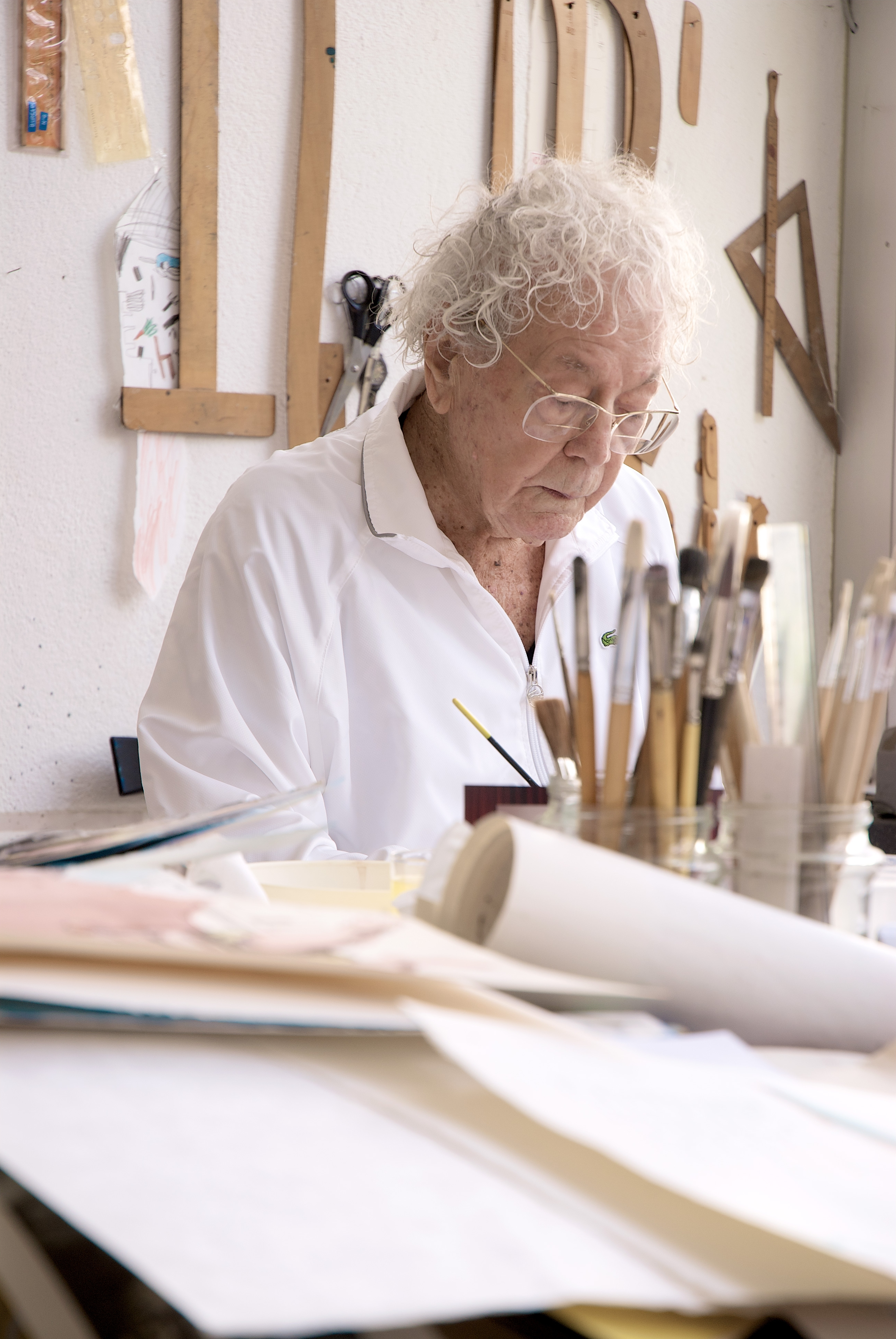
Hans Erni in April 2010

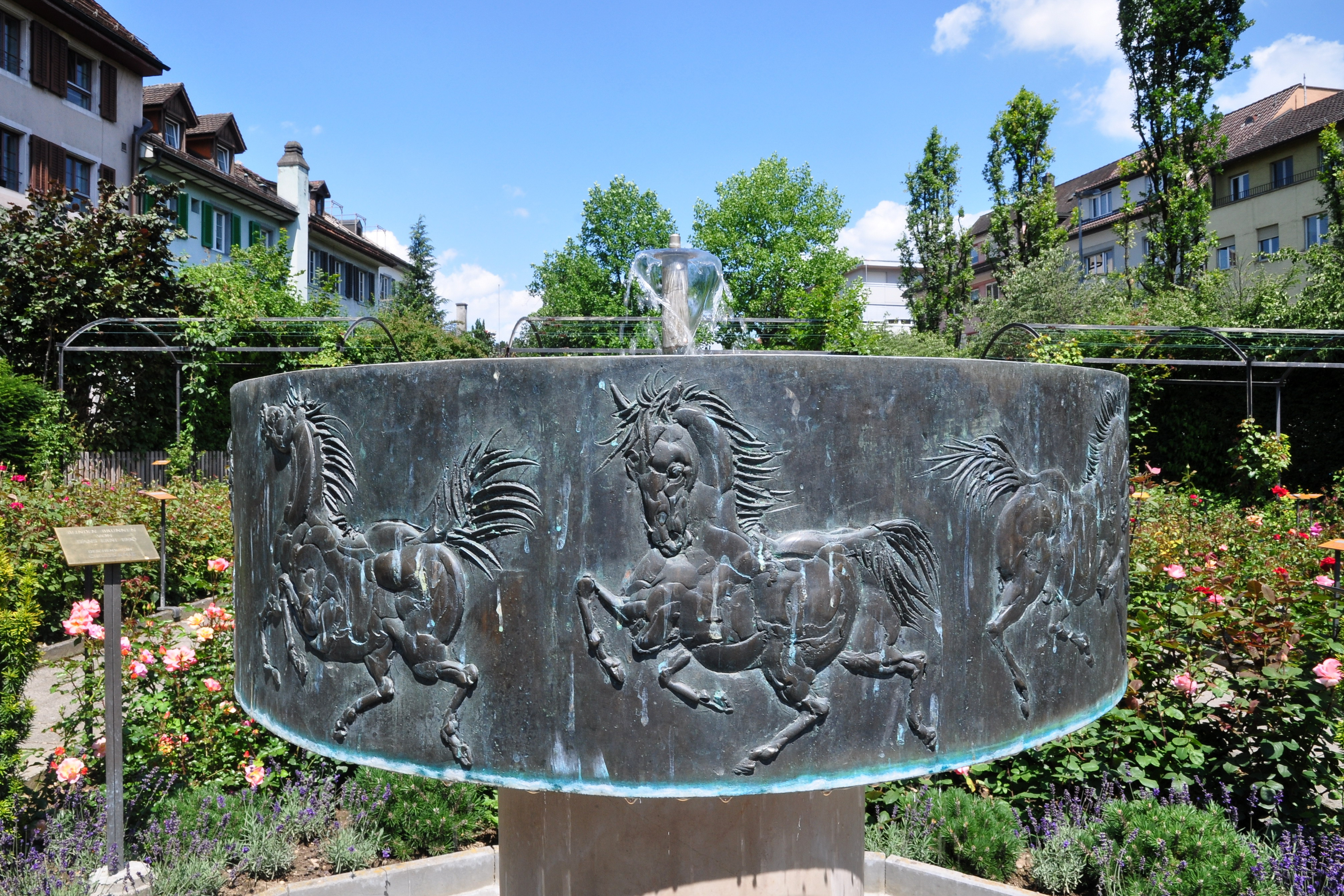
Circus Knie fountain located at the so-called Duftrosengarten in Rapperswil

== Career ==
Erni was commissioned by the Lucerne Museum Fine Arts to organize an exhibit about Pablo Picasso. The Spanish artist remained grateful for that opportunity to show his art in Switzerland. In 1936 Erni started to work with abstract art. From 1940 to 1945 he was a soldier in the Swiss army and was engaged as a camouflage painter because of his experience with large-size murals. In 1948, he was a competitor in the 1948 Summer Olympics' painting competitions. Between 1950 and 1952 he participated to exhibitions in Latin America. However, his participation in the Biennale of São Paulo was not authorized by Federal Councillor Philipp Etter. After a stay in Mauritania and Guinea he painted African topics. In 1960 he organized with Alfred Pauletto, Celestino Piatti, Hugo Wetli and Kurt Wirth an exhibition in Olten about graphic design and painting. He participated to the 1964 Documenta exhibition in Kassel, in the graphic design department.

On 15 September 1979 the Swiss Museum of Transport opened a large personal collection of Erni's works. He realized a 30 meter long mural for the Museum. Erni was very interested in sport and received the United States Sports Academy award of sport artist of the year in 1989. In 1993 his works were exhibited at the Pence Gallery in San Francisco.

He celebrated his 100th birthday in 2009. His sister, Maria Strebi-Erni (January 14, 1907 – January 29, 2014), died at the age of 107. Erni died on March 21, 2015, aged 106. His first wife, Gertrud Bohnert, had died in a horse-riding accident. They had one daughter, artist Simone Fornara Erni. With his second wife, Doris, he had a son and two daughters.

Apart from the Swiss Museum of Transport, his work is held in several other museums worldwide, including the Museum of Modern Art, the American Sport Art Museum and Archives, the Smithsonian American Art Museum, the Rose Art Museum, the Fine Arts Museums of San Francisco, the Minneapolis Institute of Art, the University of Michigan Museum of Art, the Dallas Museum of Art, the Brooklyn Museum, the Ackland Art Museum, the Harvard Art Museums, the Hammer Museum, and the Cleveland Museum of Art.

== Resources ==
- Ramuz, C.F. Histoire du soldat, illustrée de lithographies originales par Hans Erni. Lausanne: André et Pierre Gonin, [1960]. 326 copies signed by author and artist. 73 black-and-white lithographs within the text and 2 on the wrappers. 100 pages + 2 leaves. A livre d'artiste printed on Arches paper and housed in a vellum and board folder and matching slipcase.

== Bibliography ==
- (in German) Konrad Farner, Hans Erni, Weg und Zielsetzung des Künstlers. Arbeiten aus den Jahren 1931 bis 1942. Amstutz, Herdeg & Co. 1943, Zürich 1943
- (in German) Konrad Farner, Hans Erni. Ein Maler unserer Zeit. Mundus (Erbe und Gegenwart 48), Basel 1945
- (in German) Josef Rast, Grafiker als Maler, Hans Erni, Alfred Pauletto, Celestino Piatti, Hugo Wetli, Kurt Wirth. Kunstverein Olten, Olten, 1962
- (in French) Claude Roy, Hans Erni, La Guilde du Livre, num. H. C., Lausanne, 1964
- (in French) Catalogue raisonné de l'œuvre lithographie et grave de Hans Erni, Caillier, Geneva, 1969
- (in French) Jot Singh, Hans Erni, Éditions de la Tribune, Geneva, 1979
- (in French) Walter Ruegg, Hans Erni, peintures, Éditions Erpf, Bern, 1980
- (in German) John Matheson, Hans Erni. Das zeichnerische Werk und öffentliche Arbeiten, Ex Libris, Zurich, 1983
- (in French) Fondation Pierre Gianadda, Erni, vie et mythologie, Martigny, 1989
- (in German) Hans Erni. Werkverzeichnis der Lithographien, ABC, Zurich 1993, ISBN 3-85504-141-5
- (in German) Jean-Charles Giroud, Hans Erni. Die Plakate 1929–1992, Benteli, Bern, 1993
- (in German) Enrico Ghidelli, Kunst im Kleinen. Die philatelistischen und numismatischen Werke von Hans Erni, Multipress, Reinach, 1995, ISBN 3-9520837-0-4
- (in French) Jean-Charles Giroud, Hans Erni. Catalogue raisonné des livres illustrés, Geneva, 1996
- (in English, French, and German) John Matheson (Hrsg.), Hans Erni gestaltend – Hans Erni à l'œuvre – Hans Erni at work. ABC, Zurich, 1996, ISBN 3-85504-161-X
- (in German) Karl Bühlmann, Geächtet – geachtet. Die Geschichte des Hans Erni-Museums im Verkehrshaus der Schweiz in Luzern. Eine Dokumentation, Hans Erni-Stiftung, Lucerne, 1997
- (in German) Andres Furger, Ateliergespräche mit Hans Erni, NZZ, Zurich, 1998, ISBN 3-85823-739-6
- (in German) Karl Bühlmann, Marco Obrist, Hans Erni. Dialog. Arbeiten im öffentlichen Raum, Benteli, Bern, 2002, ISBN 3-7165-1285-0
- (in German) Karl Bühlmann, Zeitzeuge Hans Erni. Dokumente einer Biografie von 1909 bis 2009, NZZ, Zurich, 2009, ISBN 978-3-03823-505-7
