= Luzern Bahnhofquai =

Quay and shipping terminal on Lake Lucerne in Switzerland

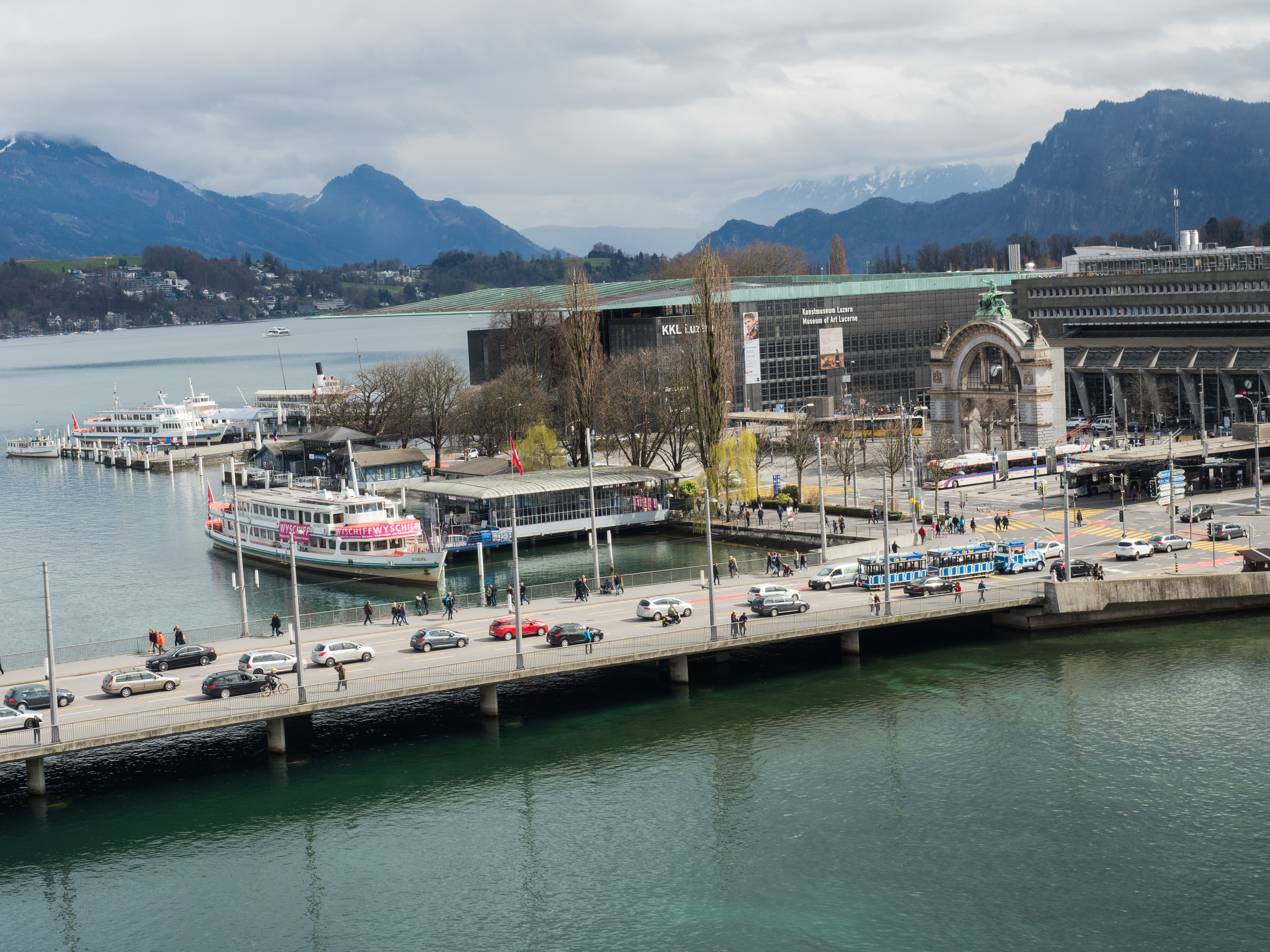
- The terminal lies beyond the Seebrücke

General information
- Location: Lucerne; Switzerland
- Coordinates: 47°03′04″N 8°18′37″E
- Elevation: 435 m (1,427 ft)
- Owner: Lake Lucerne Navigation Company
- Platforms: 6 piers
- Connections: Trains at Lucerne railway station; Verkehrsbetriebe Luzern bus and trolleybus lines

Other information
- Fare zone: 10 (Passepartout)

Services
Preceding station	Lake Lucerne Navigation Company	Following station
Terminus	Lucerne–Küssnacht am Rigi	Verkehrshaus-Lido towards Küssnacht am Rigi
Terminus	Lucerne–Flüelen	Verkehrshaus-Lido towards Flüelen
Terminus	Lucerne–Alpnachstad	Verkehrshaus-Lido towards Alpnachstad
Terminus	Lucerne–Meggenhorn	Tribschen towards Meggenhorn
Location

Luzern Bahnhofquai is a quay and shipping terminal in the city of Lucerne, in Switzerland. It is located at the northwest corner of Lake Lucerne, where the river Reuss leaves the lake and flows north toward the Aare. It is served by the Lake Lucerne Navigation Company. The terminal is located across the Bahnhofplatz from Lucerne's primary railway station.

== Layout ==
The terminal has six landing stages, numbered 1–6. No. 1 is near the Seebrücke, the stages then continue clockwise around the Lucerne Culture and Congress Centre. Directly south on the Bahnhofplatz are the bus bays of the Lucerne railway station, followed by the station building itself.

== Services ==
As of the December 2020 timetable change, the following services stop at Luzern Bahnhofquai:

- Lake Lucerne Navigation Company:
  - hourly service to Brunnen; some ships continue from Brunnen to Flüelen.
  - during the summer months, five round-trips per day to Alpnachstad
  - during the summer months, three round-trips per day to Küssnacht am Rigi
  - during the summer months, three round-trips per day to Meggenhorn

Between April and mid October, the daily Gotthard Panorama Express connects the Bahnhofquai with Lugano once a day by boat and train, travelling by boat along the length of Lake Lucerne to Flüelen, and then by train over the historic high-level Gotthard route.
