= Georges Salz =

Freethinking Swiss writer, publisher and editor

- Born: 20 November 1878; Hanover, Germany
- Died: 19 May 1949 (aged 70); St. Gallen, Switzerland
- Occupations: Writer and editor
- Writing career
- Language: German
- Notable works: Eine Reise nach den glücklichen Inseln (1935); Eine Reise nach der Côte d'Azur (1936); Ins Reich der Mitternachtssonne (1936); Auf der Fährte des Christoph Columbus (1938); Vom Meeresstrand zum Wüstenrand (1939); Im Banne der Mythen (1943)

Georges Salz or Georg Salz (20 November 1878 – 19 May 1949) was a freethinking Swiss writer, publisher and editor.

== Biography ==
Salz made an apprenticeship as a book printer. After living in England and Paris, he settled in Switzerland and acquired Swiss citizenship. In Bern he worked in large print shops and later founded his own enterprise together with Mettler.

In 1931 he married Rosa Rupp. He traveled to Europe, North Africa and Central America, and published books on his journeys. The publishers Mettler & Salz and Schären, Haeni & Salz, both based in Bern bore his name.

He was, among other things, editor of the organ of the Freethinkers Association of Switzerland Der Freidenker.

== Publications (selection) ==
=== Monographs ===
- Eine Reise nach den glücklichen Inseln. 1935. OCLC 72182111
- Eine Reise nach der Côte d'Azur. 1936. OCLC 72182109
- Ins Reich der Mitternachtssonne. 1936. OCLC 72182107
- Auf der Fährte des Christoph Columbus. 1938. OCLC 72182104
- Vom Meeresstrand zum Wüstenrand. 1939. OCLC 72182112
- Im Banne der Mythen. 1943. OCLC 72182106

=== Articles (selection) ===
- S. Simon, Ingenieur-Topograph, 1857 — 1925, Mitglied der Ortsgruppe Bern der F. V. S. In: Geistesfreiheit, vol. 4 (1925), nr. 5. doi:10.5169/seals-407214

== Secondary source ==
- Walter Schiess: Nachruf: Totentafel: Georg Salz in: Der Freidenker, vol. 32 (1949), nr. 7, p. 55.
