= Mettler =

Mettler may refer to:

- Mettler (surname)
- Mettler, California, an unincorporated area and census-designated place in Kern County
- Mettler, Western Australia, a locality of the City of Albany
- Mettler & Salz, a former Swiss publishing house
- Mettler Toledo, a multinational leader in precision instruments and services
