= Gotthard Panorama Express =

Touristic oriented named train and boat service in Switzerland

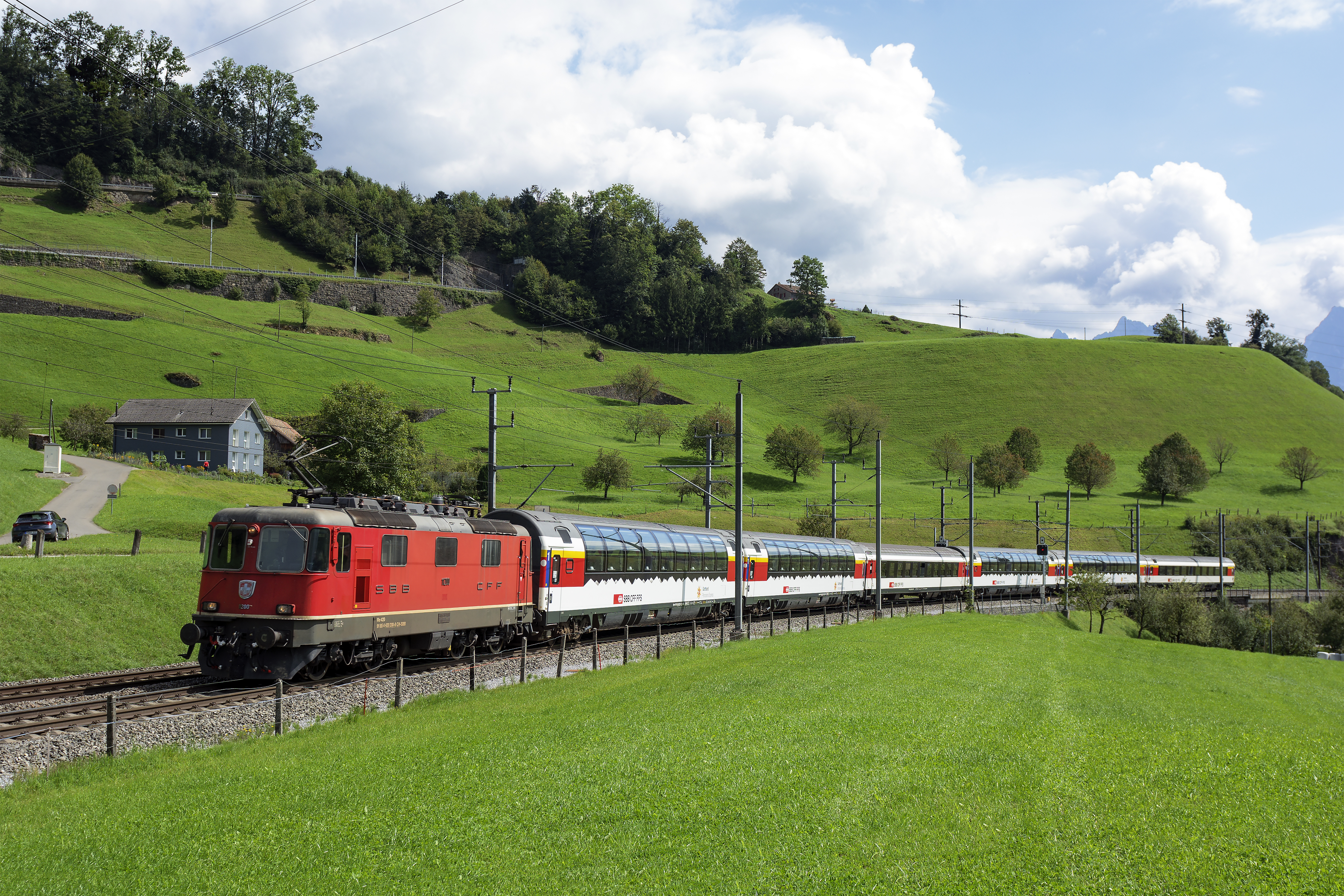
- Classic locomotive pulling panorama coaches

Overview
- Service type: Boat and Panorama Express train
- Status: Operating
- Locale: Switzerland
- Current operators: Swiss Federal Railways; Lake Lucerne Navigation Company

Route
- Termini: Lucerne / Arth-Goldau; Lugano
- Stops: Flüelen, Göschenen, Airolo, Bellinzona
- Distance travelled: 182 km (113 mi)
- Average journey time: 5.5 hours
- Service frequency: Daily (except on Mondays), from mid-April to mid-October

On-board services
- Class: 1st
- Catering facilities: Minibar on train, Restaurant on boat
- Observation facilities: Panorama cars

Technical
- Rolling stock: Re 420 locomotive, panorama cars
- Track gauge: 1,435 mm / 4 ft 8 1/2 in standard gauge

The Gotthard Panorama Express is a tourist-oriented boat and panoramic train line which connects Lucerne to Lugano, crossing the Swiss Alps from North to South through the Gotthard crest tunnel. Until 2017, the train was named the William Tell Express (German: Wilhelm Tell Express). It is jointly operated by the Swiss Federal Railways (SBB CFF FFS), who operate the train, and the Lake Lucerne Navigation Company (German: Schifffahrtsgesellschaft des Vierwaldstättersees; SGV), who operates the boat. Previous iterations of the train ran to a southern terminus at Locarno rather than the current terminus at Lugano.

== Route ==
In the southerly direction, the journey starts from the quayside in front of Lucerne station, in the central Swiss city of Lucerne (canton of Lucerne), which sits at the north-western end of Lake Lucerne (German: Vierwaldstättersee). This end of the lake is surrounded by the famous peaks of the Rigi, Pilatus and Bürgenstock, and the route sails between these mountains. The voyage then passes the Rütli meadow, where the Swiss Confederacy first came together, and the Tell Chapel that commemorates William Tell, the folk hero from whom the service took its former name. Finally the boat arrives at Flüelen landing stage (canton of Uri), at the south-eastern end of the lake and a three minute walk from Flüelen station.

Alternatively, it is also possible to start the journey at Arth-Goldau station, skipping the boat ride. At Arth-Goldau and Lucerne stations, the service connects to the Voralpen Express, among others.

At Flüelen station, passengers transfer to the train, which takes the scenic original line of the Gotthard railway that was completed in 1882. As the railway climbs up the valley of the Reuss river, it makes several spiral loops (partly in tunnels) in order to gain altitude, giving a series of different views of the village and church of Wassen, which lie in the centre of the loops. At Göschenen station the train enters the original Gotthard Tunnel (a culmination tunnel through the Saint-Gotthard Massif) and emerges into the southern facing Leventina valley near Airolo in the Italian speaking canton of Ticino. Descending this valley, with the aid of several more spiral loops, the train eventually arrives at Bellinzona, the capital city of Ticino that is famous for its three World Heritage listed castles. Connections are available at Bellinzona station for Locarno at Lago Maggiore. The train continues from Bellinzona to Lugano station, in the southern Swiss city of Lugano on the lake of the same name.

The whole journey takes about 5 hours and 30 minutes, divided roughly evenly between the boat and train rides, and operates once a day in both directions, almost daily (except on Mondays) between mid-April and mid-October. The section on Lake Lucerne is normally operated by a historic paddle steamer, whilst the train uses air-conditioned 1st class coaches with panoramic windows. Premium fares or supplements are charged.

There is a bus transfer between Lugano and Tirano RhB station in Tirano, linking the Gotthard Panorama Express and the Bernina Express.

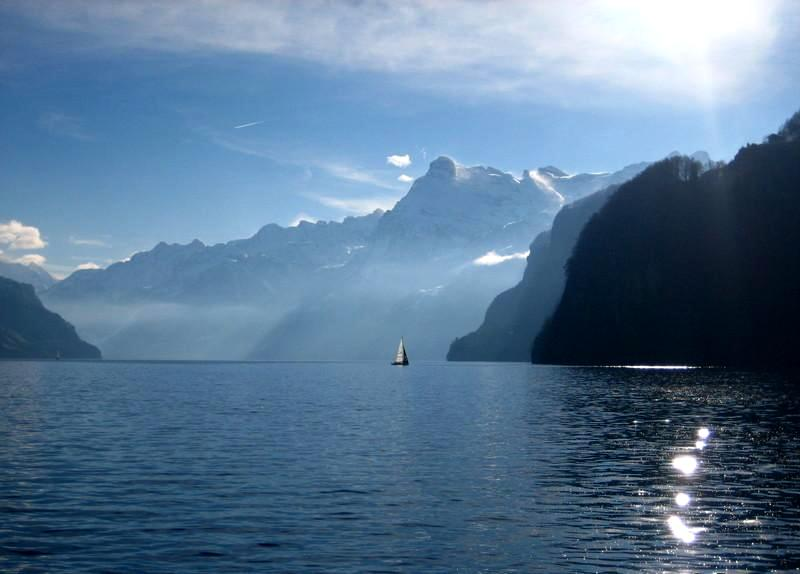
View from the boat on Lake Lucerne

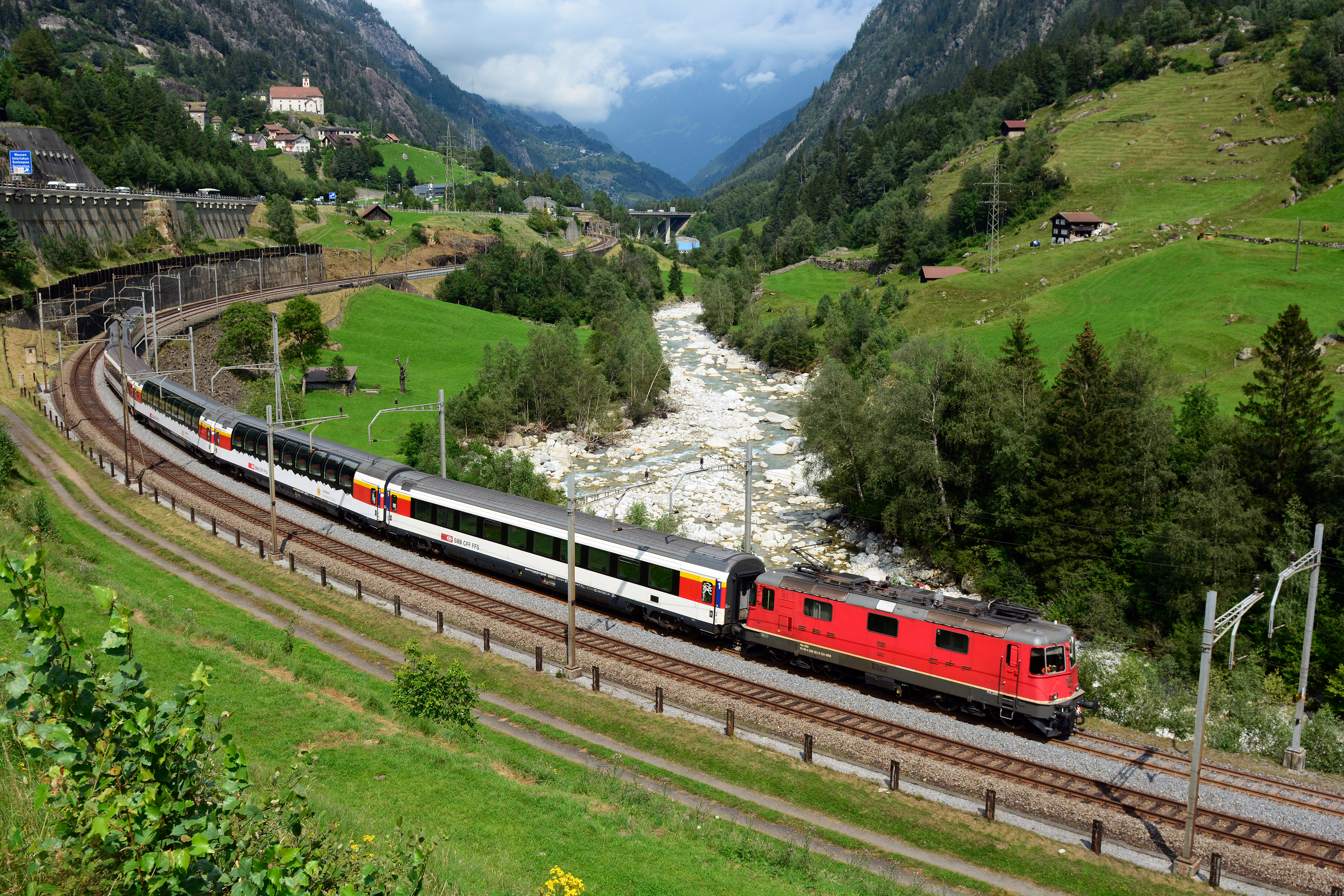
The train near Wassen in the upper Reuss valley

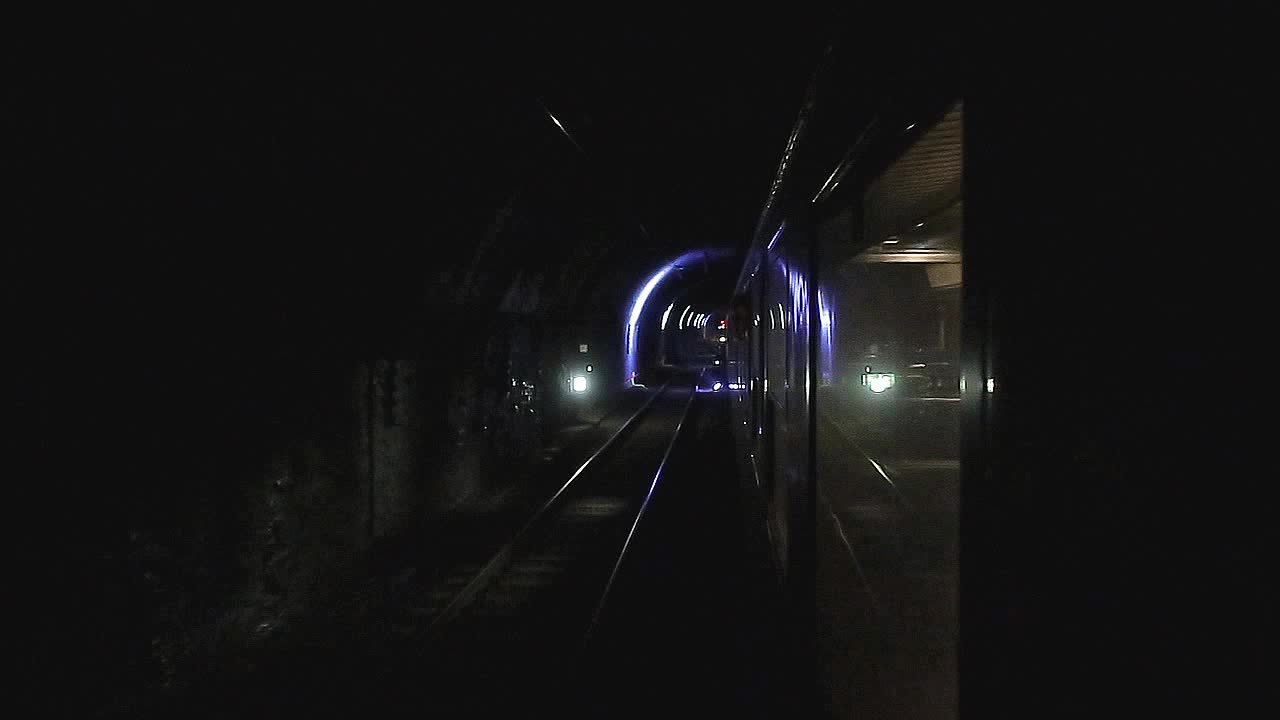
Images and short film sequences projected onto the wall of the Gotthard Tunnel

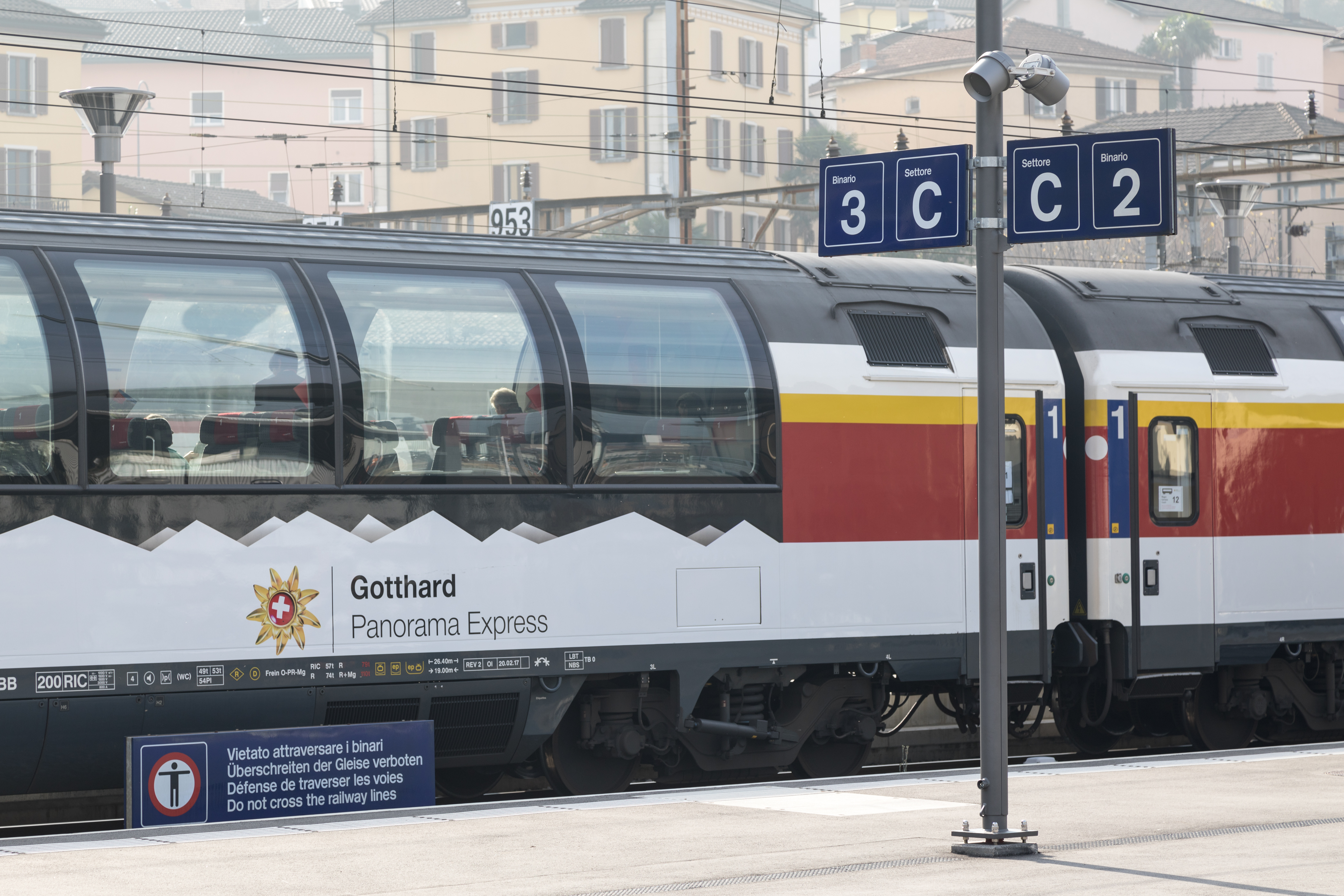
1st class panorama cars in Bellinzona

=== Alternatives ===
Standard, non-premium, fare alternatives exist for both legs of the journey. The Lake Lucerne Navigation Company provides other services, utilising both paddle steamers and modern motor vessels, between Lucerne and Flüelen. The Swiss South Eastern Railway (German: Südostbahn, SOB) operates hourly InterRegio (IR26/46) services (named Treno Gottardo, lit. 'Gotthard Train') over the same route as the Panorama Express train between Flüelen and Bellinzona, continuing southwards to Locarno (with connections to Lugano) and northwards to either Zürich HB or Basel SBB (via Lucerne). in addition, direct trains (InterCity/IC and EuroCity/EC) also operate between Lucerne, Bellinzona and Lugano via the less scenic but shorter Gotthard Base Tunnel route. This route may be useful for passengers making a return journey, as the journey time by this route is under two hours.

== See also ==
- Bernina Express
- Glacier Express
- GoldenPass Express
- Rail transport in Switzerland
