= Mettler (surname) =

Mettler is a German surname. Notable people with the surname include:

- Barbara Mettler (born 1971), Swiss cross country skier
- Bea Mettler (born 1978), Swiss footballer
- Bill Mettler (born 1946), American swimmer
- Cecilia Mettler, American medical historian
- Dölf Mettler (1934–2015), Swiss yodeler, composer and painter
- Jim Mettler, American politician
- Liselotte Mettler, Austrian-German surgeon
- Melanie Mettler (born 1977), Swiss politician
- Nemo Mettler (born 1999), Swiss singer
- Peter Mettler (born 1958), Swiss-Canadian film director and cinematographer
- Ruben F. Mettler (1924–2006), American businessman
- Suzanne Mettler, American political scientist and author
- Yannick Mettler (born 1989), Swiss racing driver

== See also ==
- Mettler (disambiguation)
