= Swiss Museum of Transport =

Coordinates: 47°03′10″N 8°20′09″E

- Verkehrshaus der Schweiz
- Established: 1 July 1959; 67 years ago
- Location: Lucerne
- Type: Transportation museum
- Founder: Alfred Waldis
- Public transit access: Luzern Verkehrshaus, S-Bahn, Voralpen-Express
- Website: verkehrshaus.ch

The Swiss Museum of Transport or Verkehrshaus der Schweiz ("Swiss House of Transportation") in Lucerne opened in July 1959 and exhibits all forms of transport including trains, automobiles, ships and aircraft as well as communication technology. It is Switzerland's most popular museum. The museum also maintains a large collection of work by Hans Erni, a local painter and sculptor.

There are several other attractions in the museum besides the collection, including a planetarium, a large-format cinema and a 1:20,000 scale aerial photograph of Switzerland.

== History ==
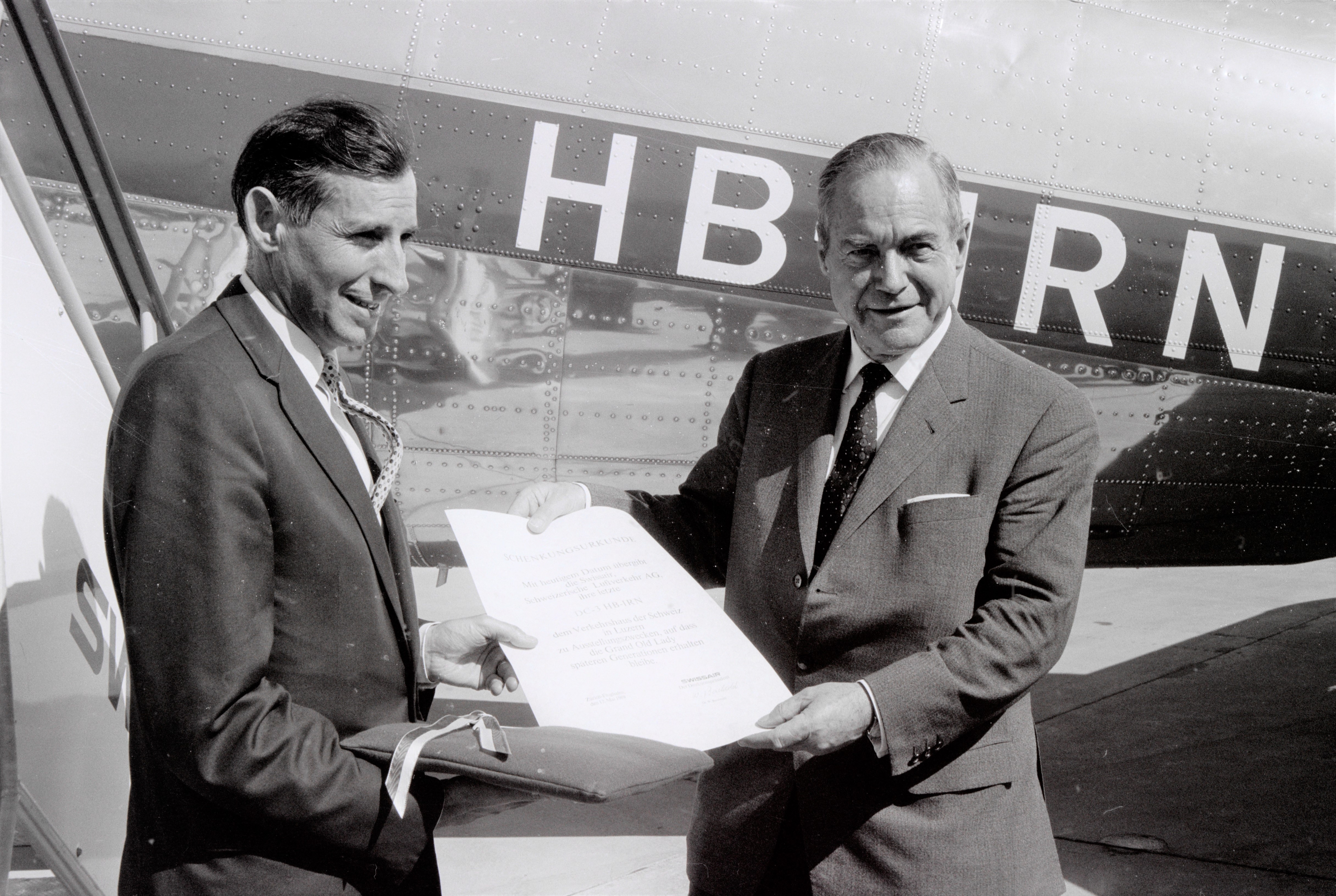
Museum director Alfred Waldis accepting a DC-3 as a donation from the president of Swissair in 1969

The museum traces its history to 1897, when the first attempts at creating a museum of railway equipment were made. Following a national exhibition in 1914, the Swiss Railway Museum was founded by Swiss Federal Railways in 1918 in Zurich. The concept eventually grew to encompass all transportation and, in 1942, the Swiss Museum of Transport association was established. Swiss Federal Railways was joined by the Swiss Postal Telegraph and Telephone as well as other private transport, trade, industry, and tourism organizations. However, when no suitable site could be found in Zurich for the planned museum, the city of Lucerne offered the association a 22,500-square-metre (242,000 ft^{2}) site adjacent to Lake Lucerne. Construction began in 1957 and the museum was opened two years later on 1 July 1959. A planetarium was added in 1969 and an aerospace hall in 1972.

In the course of a storm, flooding occurred in the museum on the night of 21–22 August 2005, which inundated some of the displays and damaged contents in the basement rooms of the navigation and aviation departments.

== Exhibits ==
The museum is divided into a variety of thematic areas:

=== Rail ===
Amongst the rail transport collection are rolling stock from Switzerland's first ever railway, the Swiss Northern Railway and a SBB Ae 8/14 electric engine. An H0 gauge model railway layout of the Gotthard portrays the northern ramp of the Gotthard railway between Erstfeld station and the Göschenen tunnel, including the three loop/curved tunnels near Wassen. Due to reconstruction of a part of the railway hall this large model railway was removed and put to storage until further notice. The hall also features a train simulator, which visitors can use to travel through the NRLA base tunnel.

=== Automotive ===
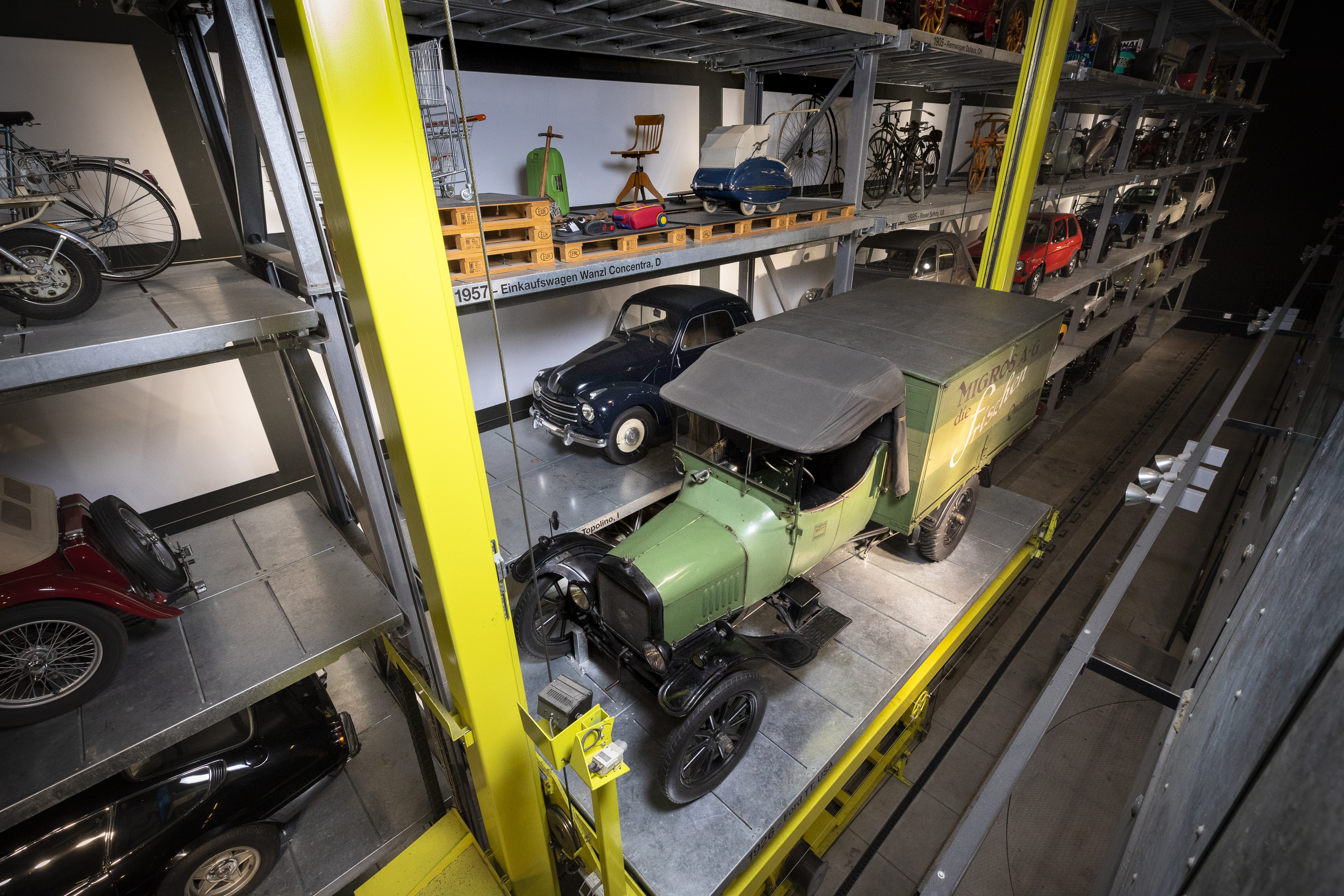
Car theatre

The road transport collection on display contains horse-drawn vehicles, bicycles, motorcycles and cars, as well as an exhibition on road safety realized in cooperation with the Swiss Council for Accident Prevention. One major attraction is the Car Theatre, in which a vehicle, selected from a collection of vehicles from all periods of automobile history, is hoisted out of a high-bay warehouse and presented on a stage. The external facades of the hall are covered by 344 Swiss road signs. The hall is also home to a special exhibition on the world of logistics. It comprises an AutoStore automated small parts warehouse, an animated miniature distribution centre, a tyre robot, interactive picking stations, and the virtual harvest-to-retail journey of a pineapple. After the closure of the Monteverdi Museum in Binningen in 2016, most of the cars from the collection were transferred to the Swiss Museum of Transport, who created an exhibit on the Monteverdi marque.

=== Aviation ===
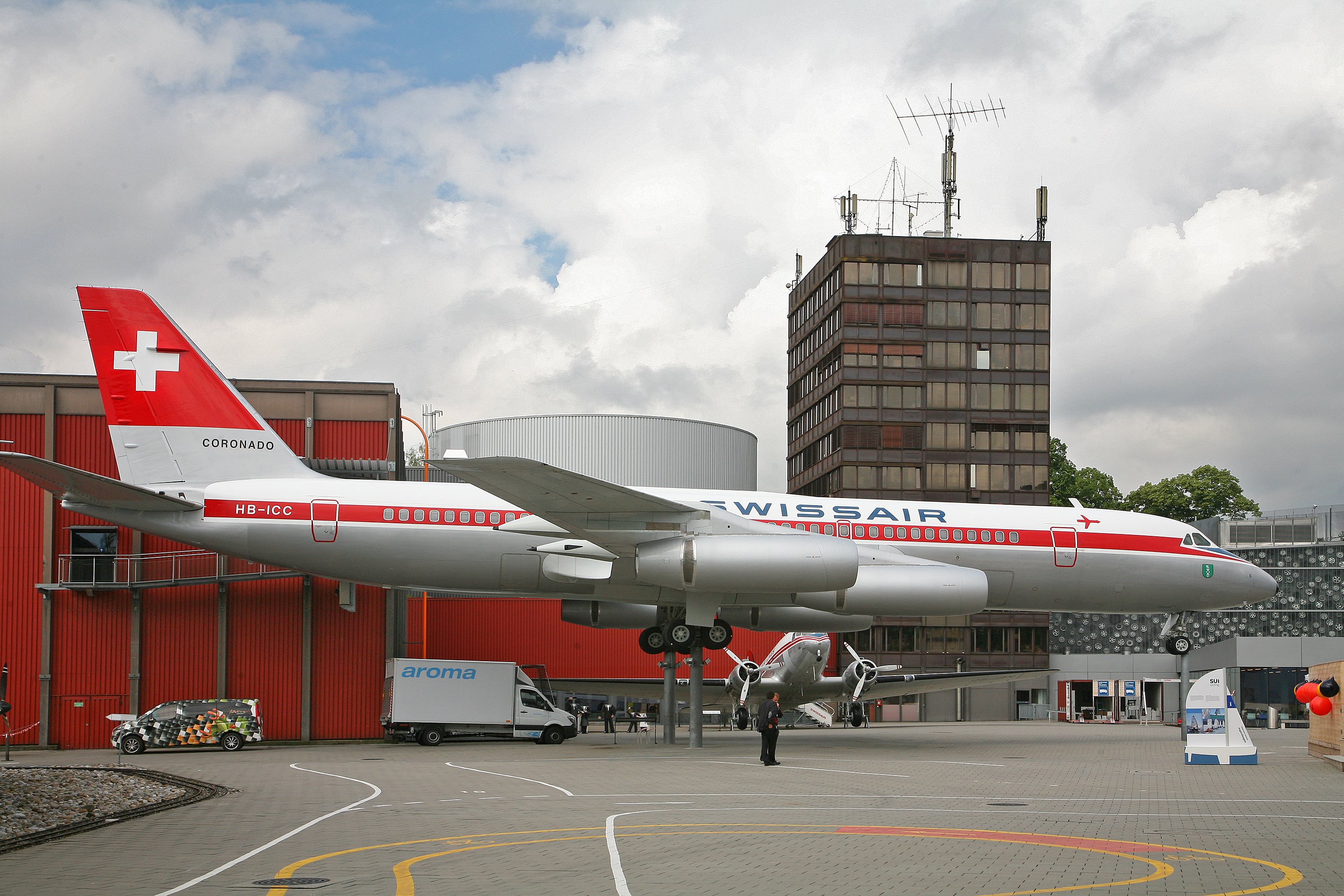
Convair 990

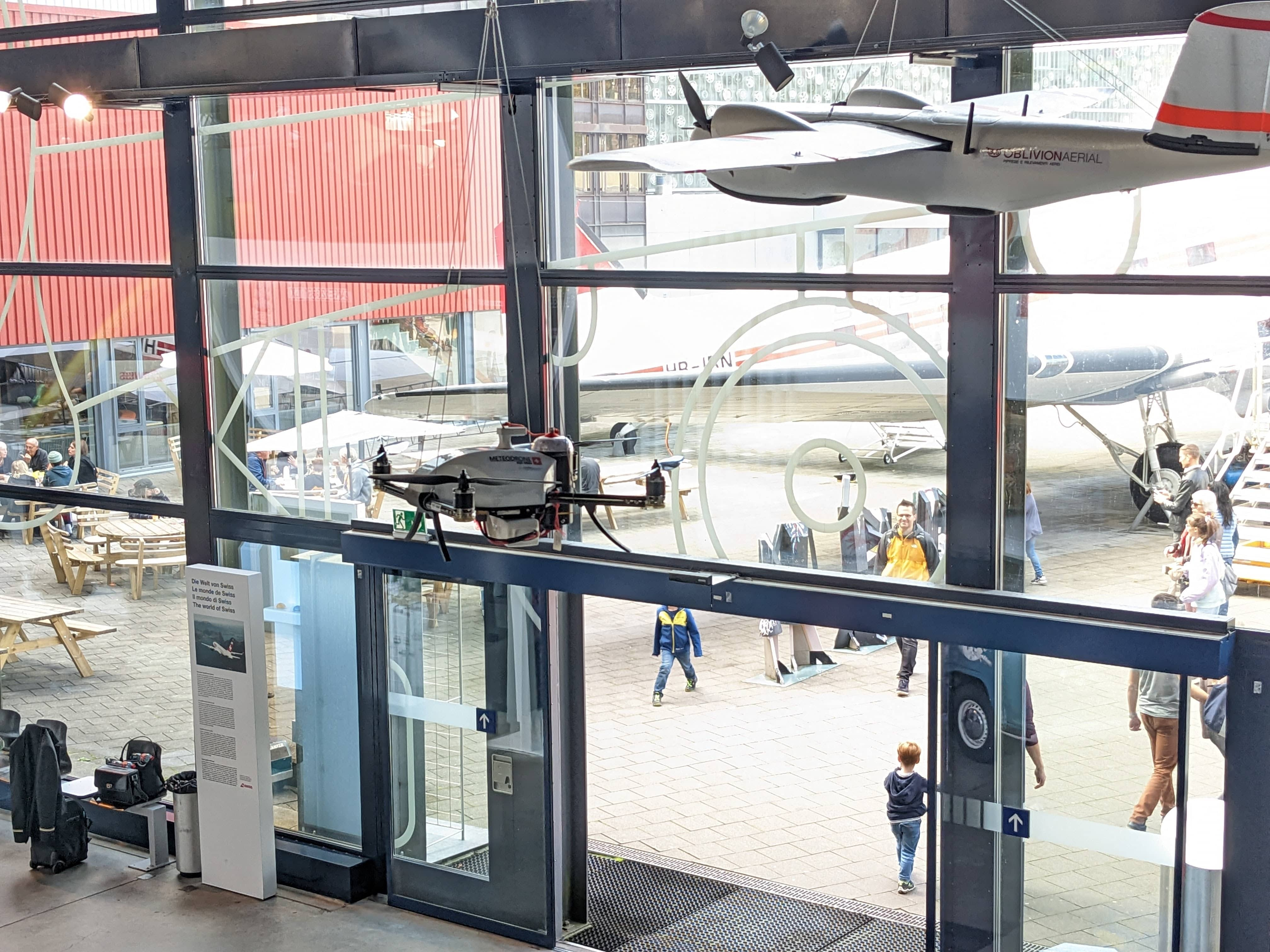
Meteodrone SUI-9999

The current aviation exhibition features civil aviation, mountain and rescue interventions, Swiss engineering achievements, and flying as a career. The 30 or so original aircraft on display range from a 1909 Dufaux 4 biplane, the oldest surviving Swiss aircraft; a Blériot XI flown by aviation pioneer Oskar Bider, the only surviving Lockheed Orion, three Swissair aircraft, including a Convair 990; a Northrop F-5E fighter in the colors of the Patrouille Suisse aerobatic team, and a Bombardier Challenger 604 used by the Rega air rescue service. A row of display cases containing scale models of aircraft show the development of aviation from its beginnings to the present day. Besides crewed aircraft, the exhibition also displays a Meteodrone SUI-9999, a weather drone patented by the Swiss company Meteomatics that collects weather data from the mid and low levels of the atmosphere.

=== Space ===
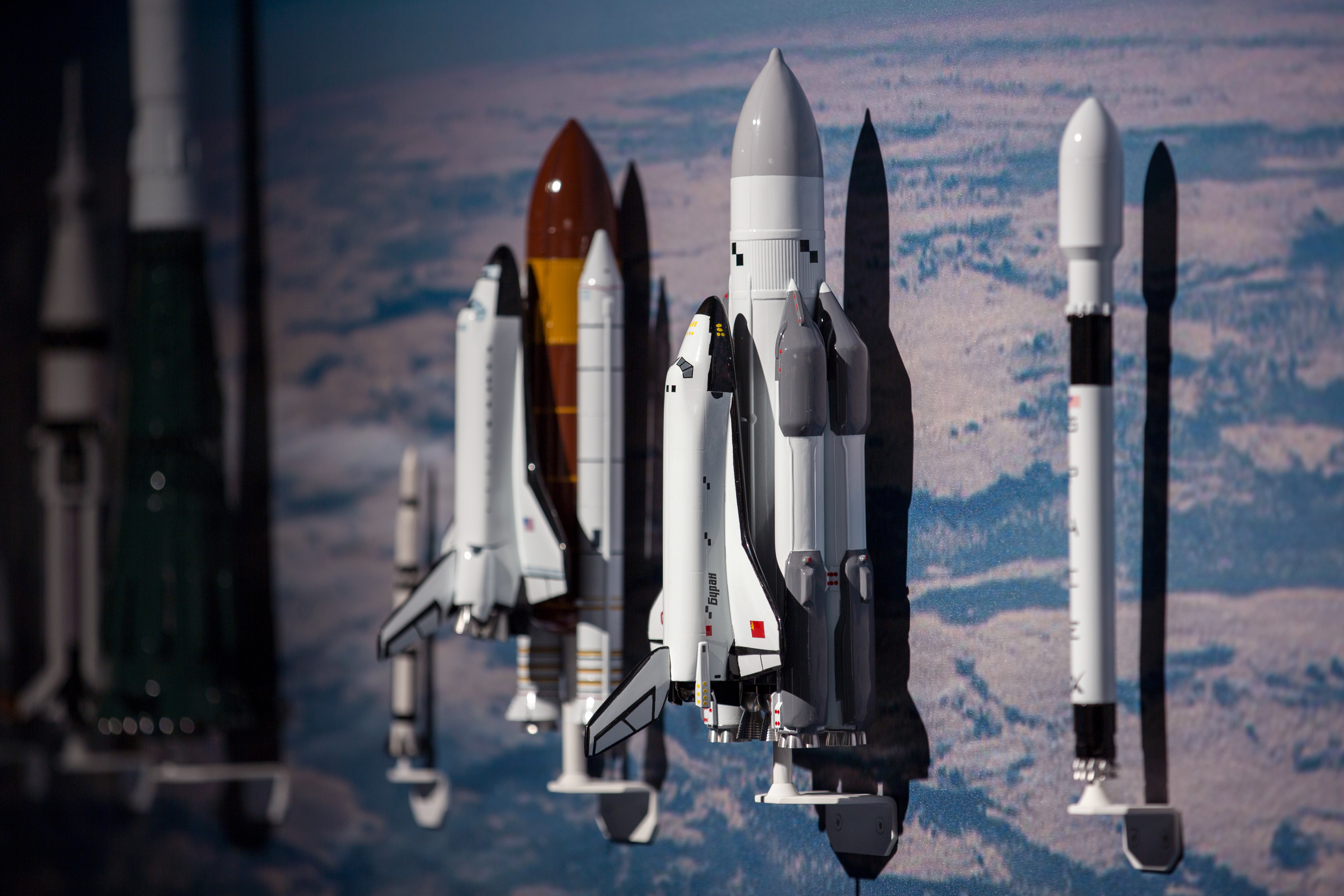
Rocket models

The space exhibit houses the 4.5 tonne EURECA, one of only a few satellites returned safely to Earth. Other displays include a Spacelab pallet, a piece of the original foil of the solar wind experiment conducted as part of the first Moon landing (Apollo 11, 1969), a Moon rock, a Martian landscape with full-size models of three Mars rovers, and duplicates of measuring instruments that explored the Churyumov-Gerasimenko comet as part of the Rosetta mission. The interactive portion of the exhibition is a "Space Transformer", a large walk-in cube that rotates slowly around its diagonal axis, giving the impression of disorientation in a space station.

=== Navigation ===
The exhibits in the hall, which opened in 1984, provide an overview of how shipping developed in Switzerland. On display outside is the submersible Mésoscaphe, designed by Auguste Piccard for the Swiss national exposition of 1964 and the Rigi, the world's oldest surviving flush-deck side-wheeler steamer.

The "Nautirama" multimedia show depicts the marine history of Central Switzerland. A cutaway model of the Pilatus saloon paddle steamer, engines by Saurer and Escher & Wyss, outboard engines and Voith-Schneider propellers trace the development of ship propulsion. Also in the exhibition are flying ships, the smallest two-man submersible, a model of the waterways locks in Birsfelden, sailing boats, a lifeboat from the ocean-going MS Carona that sank in 1964, and a steamship parade featuring models of some of the vessels that ply Switzerland's lakes.

=== Aerial cableways ===
The exhibition illustrates developments in aerial cableway engineering from early hand-operated cableways and ski lifts to modern-day large-capacity cable cars. It includes a working model of Engelberg's Stand-Kleintitlis reversible cableway and a cabin from the Wetterhorn Elevator with original running gear. The exhibition also incorporates a section of the old Grindelwald-Männlichen gondola cableway complete with cabin. The tourism section of the exhibition features the crowd-pulling Tourism Flipper marble run. The adjacent "Livemap Switzerland" is a 1:20000 scale aerial view of Switzerland that can be walked on.

=== Hans Erni Museum ===
Built in 1979, the museum has on display a large collection of works by the Lucerne artist Hans Erni. It also holds temporary exhibitions featuring works by other artists. The second floor includes the Panta Rhei, a mural depicting great Western thinkers on two 18 meter long panels.

=== Other exhibits ===
Also located at the museum are a planetarium and a theater. An exhibit about media was sponsored by Red Bull.

== Collection ==
=== Documentation Centre ===
The museum maintains a library and archive of documents related to transportation.

=== National Transport Collection ===
The museum maintains the Swiss National Transport Collection of items of "important technical, social, economic and cultural development" related to transportation that were "produced, modified and/or used in Switzerland".

== Access ==
The museum is located on the shore of Lake Lucerne in the northern section of the city of Lucerne, some 30 minutes walking time from the town centre. It is served by trains of the Lucerne S-Bahn at the adjacent Lucerne Verkehrshaus railway station, by boat services of the Schifffahrtsgesellschaft des Vierwaldstättersees at the Verkehrshaus-Lido landing stage on the lake, and by the Lucerne trolleybus system. All three provide convenient connections with central Lucerne.

== See also ==
- List of aerospace museums
- List of transport museums
- List of museums in Switzerland
- Transport in Switzerland
