= Marcel Bollinger =

Swiss politician and freethinker

Bollinger, Marcel
- Born: Bollinger, Marcel; 17 April 1923; Schaffhausen
- Died: 17 May 2003 (aged 80); Beringen
- Occupations: Swiss editor and municipal council
- Years active: 1956-2003
- Known for: Social Democratic Party of Switzerland and freethinker
- Notable work: Trade unionists

Marcel Bollinger (17 April 1923 in Schaffhausen – 17 May 2003 in Beringen) was a Swiss freethinker.

== Biography ==
Bollinger and his later wife Emmi were politically shaped in Schaffhausen youth groups of the working-class movement of the 1930s. He became a member of the Social Democratic Party of Switzerland and trade unionists and was from 1956 to 1988 SP municipal council in Beringen.

From 1958 to 1979 he was the central president of the Freethinkers Association of Switzerland.

== Freethinker award ==
On 9 October 2015 the Swiss Freethinkers awarded the [Freidenkerpreis] prize, worth 10,000 francs, for the first time. The Freethinkers Award will be awarded every two years and will be financed by a gift of inheritance.
