= Ernst Akert =

Swiss freethinker

Ernst Akert (20 April 1871 – after 1942) was a Swiss freethinker.

== Biography ==
Akert is one of the founders of the defeated Swiss Freethinkers Association [Freidenkerbund] during the First World War. Among the things he wrote for the Freidenkerbund and published writings about the Walser. In 1942 he published a monograph titled Gottfried Keller's Weltanschauung, in which he discussed the position of the Swiss writer on God, immortality, religion and the Church; this is Akert's most common writing style.

In 1942, Akert moved to Lugano after living in Bern for many years.
