= Dtv Verlagsgesellschaft =

German publishing house

dtv Verlagsgesellschaft
- Status: Active
- Founded: 30 November 1960
- Country of origin: Germany
- Headquarters location: Munich
- Key people: Claudia Baumhöver; Bernd Blüm
- Revenue: €65 million (2015)
- No. of employees: 125 (2015)
- Official website: www.dtv.de

The dtv Verlagsgesellschaft is a German publishing house headquartered in Munich. It was founded in 1960 by eleven publishers as a common paperback publishing house named "Deutscher Taschenbuch Verlag" (German paperback publishing house). Starting in 1996, dtv also published original editions and first editions. Since 2012, dtv has its own program with hardcover books. In 2015 the company's sales, with its 125 employees, were €65 million. dtv publishes approximately 500 new books annually. Its inventory of available titles and e-books is around 7000. In June 2015 the "Deutscher Taschenbuch Verlag" became the "dtv Verlagsgesellschaft".

From 1996 to 2015, Wolfgang Balk was the publishing CEO of dtv.

== Founding ==
The founding of the publishing house happened through the initiative of publisher Joseph Caspar Witsch, who convinced ten other publishers to publish paperbacks together. The combination was initially a company for the exploitation of publishing rights. They were to only publish the books of publishers that joined. On 30 November 1960, the company was entered in the commercial register; provisional manager was Curt Vinz. On 15 January 1961, the publisher officially started its activities and was led by Heinz Friedrich. Friedrich was the program director of Radio Bremen. From 1956 to 1959, Friedrich had been the chief editor of S. Fischer Verlag. Soon licenses from other publishers, who did not belong to the shareholders, were added on and their production began. For the design of the books, Swiss graphic designer Celestino Piatti was responsible, in which he designed a uniform typographic and graphical appearance.

Shareholders of the publishers treaty included the Artemis Verlag, C.H.Beck/Biederstein, Deutsche Verlags-Anstalt, Carl Hanser Verlag, Hegner Verlag, Insel Verlag, Kiepenheuer & Witsch, Kösel-Verlag, Nymphenburger Verlag, Piper Verlag and Walter Verlag. Heinz Friedrich was also a partner.

The first title published in 1961 was Heinrich Böll's Irisches Tagebuch. The book has since been continuously dtv- number 1 for availability. Other titles published in the start year were Die Atombombe und die Zukunft des Menschen by Karl Jaspers, as well as Nur für Leser by Friedrich Sieburg. The design of the books caused a sensation, because Piatti presented the book covers of the dtv-volumes in brilliant white and an individual image for the title was used, where as the cover for paperbacks from other publishers were mostly designed colorfully. Celestino Piatti designed around 6000 dtv book covers up until his retirement in 1993.

== Publishing program ==
The publisher's concentration was editions, such as the first Goethe edition in paperback, Nietzsche's complete works and the German dictionary of the Brothers Grimm.

Contemporary German literature included in the program were that of, among others, Heinrich Böll, Günter Grass, Siegfried Lenz, Uwe Timm, Angelika Schrobsdorff, Erich Loest, Rafael Seligmann, Christian Kracht, Antje Rávic Strubel, Christopher Kloeble, Wolf Wondratschek, Thomas Glavinic, Ulrich Woelk and Judith Zander.

International literature paperback editions included are from authors such as Umberto Eco, T. C. Boyle, Michael Ondaatje, Henning Mankell, J. R. R. Tolkien and German first editions of John Williams, Graham Swift, Eshkol Nevo, Mira and also Ha Jin. Even Julia Franck, Maxim Biller, Javier Marías, Milan Kundera, Andreas Kollender and António Lobo Antunes were in the program over several years with several titles.

The nonfiction program with publications on social, literary, cultural historical and political issues, guidebooks and reference books has authors such as Daniel Goleman, Marcel Reich-Ranicki, Ian Kershaw, Wolfgang Benz, Verena Kast, Hildegard Hamm-Brücher and Marianne Koch. Also, multicolored books including André Heller's Bilderleben, appear in dtv.

In dtv premium, paperback originals and first editions in the fields of fiction and nonfiction in larger formats have been published since 1996. In 2012, dtv hardcover was launched with Rita Falk's novel Hannes and Jussi Adler-Olsen's thriller Verachtung. In 2014, the label dtvDIGITAL was established in order to merge the e-book publishing activities.

In the founding year, the first book series dtv documente was released, in which the first volume was Das Urteil von Nürnberg 1946. The series includes documents from authentic texts on issues about history and contemporary history, as well as art, literature and intellectual history. In the sixties, another series like dtv sachbuch, dtv kunst andWissenschaftliche Reihe (later in 1979 dtv wissenschaft) came about. Complete editions from writers such as Goethe, Friedrich Schiller or Büchner were published. In 1975 the so-called Dünndruck-Ausgaben became available. Through the use of thin paper, more extensive works such as Grimmelshausen's Simplicissimus or novels from Dostoevsky could be published.

To date, a few editions of the early years have remained, including the 1973 launched series dtv zweisprachig and the 1977 established dtv großdruck. dtv großdruck contains a selection of dtv titles in full, and in the eye friendly "Garamond 12 point" font, which are mainly intended for the elderly and visually impaired. Furthermore, the series of reference books and atlases from yet he early sixties have maintained to this day and form an important sector in the published program.

The design was redesigned in 1996/1997. At that time, the first volumes of the series dtv premium were published.
