= Leo Heinrich Skrbensky =

- Born: Czech Lev Jindřich Skrbenský; 23 April 1905; Aussig
- Occupation: Czechoslovak editor
- Years active: 1873–1932
- Known for: Czechoslovak freethinker, editor and non-fiction author of the 20th century

Leo Heinrich Skrbensky (also birth name: Leo-Heinrich Skrbensky, Czech Lev Jindřich Skrbenský, born 23 April 1905 in Aussig; date of death unknown) was a Czechoslovak freethinker, editor and non-fiction author of the 20th century.

== Biography ==
Leo Heinrich Skrbensky was son of Count Jan Skrbenský of Hříště (born 1868, date of death unknown) and his wife Malvína Kolowrat (1873–1932). He was nephew of Cardinal Leo Skrbenský of Hříště (Czech Lev Skrbenský z Hříště). Until the expropriation in 1945 he lived with Schönpriesen family in Aussig.

Skrbensky received his Ph.D. in 1928 at Charles Czech Technical University in Prague. He wrote numerous articles written by Dr. Ing. phil for the organ of the Freethinkers Association of Switzerland and was the author of several non-fiction books.

It is known that in 1939 he was a member of the supervisory board of E. Heuer, Chemische Fabrik AG in Aussig; a branch of Dresden-based Chemical Factory Cotta E. Heuer in Dresden.

== Works ==
- The church blesses the oath break. Bern: Free Spirit Association of Switzerland, 1935.
- Catholic mirror. Munich: Reinhardt, 1935.
- Catholic types. Berne: Mettler & Salz, 1937
- Max Planck and free will. Dresden: Publishing Association Nature and Spirit, 1936.
- Religion and upper class. Bern: Free Spirit Association of Switzerland, 1936.
- Seven guiding principles on the question of "community and faith". Dresden: Beßner, 1936.
- Franz Brentano as a religious philosopher. Zurich: reference of the free-spirited union of Switzerland, 1937.
