= Walter Schiess =

- Born: Walter Schiess; 6 September 1898; Herisau
- Died: 12 November 1959 (aged 61); Bern
- Occupation: Swiss editor
- Years active: 1923-2003
- Known for: He published an anniversary magazine in 1952 and freethinker
- Notable work: One hundred years of electrical communications in Switzerland.

Walter Schiess (born September 6, 1898 in Herisau, † November 12, 1959) was a Swiss editor and freethinker.

== Biography ==
Schiess attended Kantons school. He studied telephone and telegraph administration and worked as a telegraphist in the main telegraph office in Bern. Later on, he took over the editorial office of the Technische Rundschau. He published an anniversary magazine in 1952: One hundred years of electrical communications in Switzerland.

For many years, Schiess was the central president of Freethinkers Association of Switzerland until 1958, when Marcel Bollinger replaced him. During the Second World War, he was editor of the organ of Freethinkers Association.
