= Meggenhorn Castle =

Castle in Meggen, Switzerland

Coordinates: 47°02′07″N 8°21′22″E

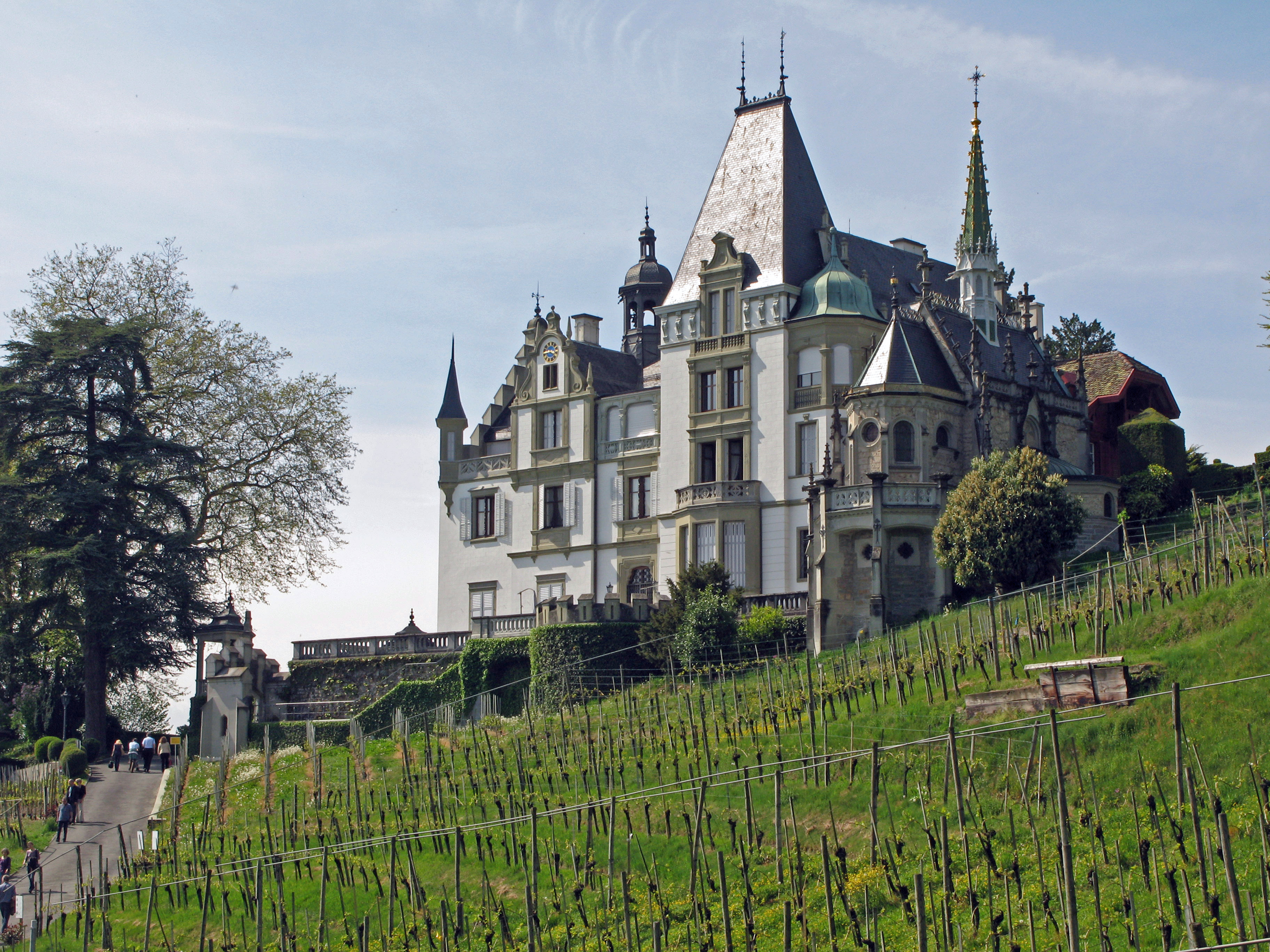
Meggenhorn castle in 2009

Meggenhorn Castle (German: Schloss Meggenhorn) is a castle in Meggen near the Swiss city of Lucerne. It was built in 1868/70 by Edouad Hofer-Grosjean from Mulhouse and in 1926 equipped with a Welte Philharmonic Organ. It is surrounded by vineyards and is considered to be the municipality's symbol. Today, it is mostly used as a tourist attraction and reception venue. It is a Swiss heritage site of national significance.

Meggenhorn is served by a landing stage on Lake Lucerne that is some 400 metres (1,300 ft) walk from the castle. On weekends and some other days, the Lake Lucerne Navigation Company (German: Schifffahrtsgesellschaft des Vierwaldstättersees) operate several return sailings between the Bahnhofquai, adjacent to Lucerne station, and Meggenhorn.

== See also ==
- List of castles in Switzerland
