= Küssnacht am Rigi landing stage =

Küssnacht am Rigi
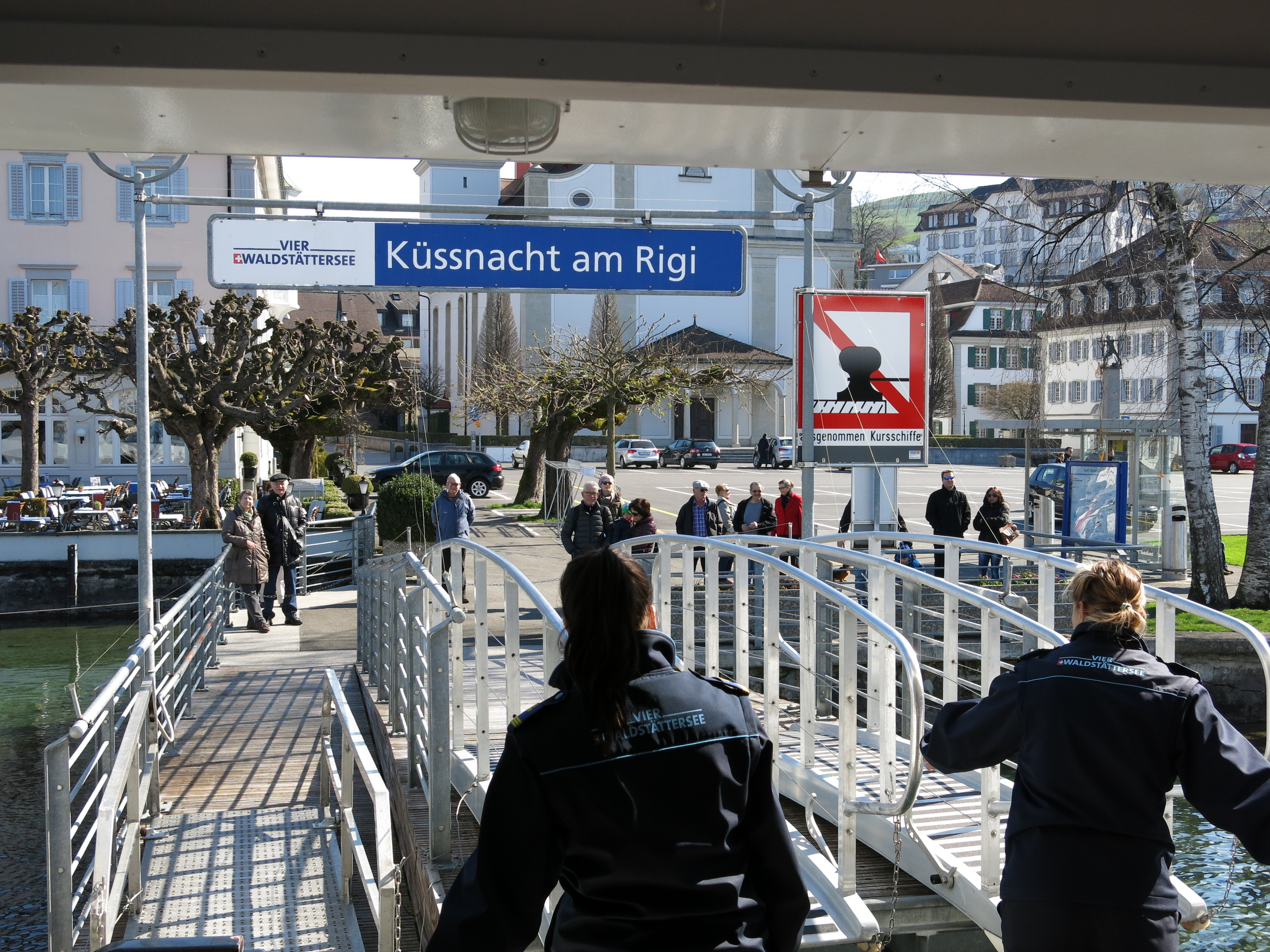
- Passengers disembarking in 2015

General information
- Location: Küssnacht, Schwyz; Switzerland
- Coordinates: 47°04′48″N 8°26′19″E
- Elevation: 449 m (1,473 ft)
- Owner: Lake Lucerne Navigation Company
- Platforms: 1 pier

Other information
- Fare zone: 29 (Passepartout); 676 (Tarifverbund Schwyz)

Services
Preceding station	Lake Lucerne Navigation Company	Following station
Merlischachen towards Luzern Bahnhofquai	Lucerne–Küssnacht am Rigi	Terminus
Location

Küssnacht am Rigi landing stage (German: Küssnacht am Rigi (See)) is a landing stage in the municipality of Küssnacht, in the Swiss canton of Schwyz. It is located at the northeast corner of Lake Lucerne and is served by the Lake Lucerne Navigation Company. It is approximately 1 kilometre (0.62 mi) southeast of the Küssnacht am Rigi railway station.

== Services ==
As of the December 2020 timetable change, the following services stop at Küssnacht am Rigi:

- Lake Lucerne Navigation Company: during the summer months, three round-trips per day to Luzern Bahnhofquai.
