= Celestino Piatti =

Swiss graphic artist (1922–2007)

Celestino Piatti (January 5, 1922 – December 17, 2007) was a Swiss graphic artist, painter and book designer. He was a popular illustrator of children's books and achieved international success as a designer for Deutscher Taschenbuch Verlag (DTV).

== Life ==
Piatti was born on January 5, 1922, in Wangen-Brüttisellen, the son of a Ticino stonemason and a Zurich farmer's daughter. He grew up in Dietlikon, near Zürich. Between 1938 and 1942 he trained in the Gebrüder Fretz studio, and took evening classes with Ernst und Max Gubler at the Kunstgewerbeschule in Zurich (today the Zürcher Hochschule der Künste), and then qualified as a graphic teacher. Between 1945 and the end of 1948 he worked in the studio of Fritz Bühler in Basel. From 1948 he had his own graphic design studio. In 1966 he settled in Duggingen near Basel, where he lived until his death.

His first international success came as a designer of posters. He designed more than five hundred, many of which won prizes. In 1964 his work was included in the graphic design section of documenta III in Kassel.

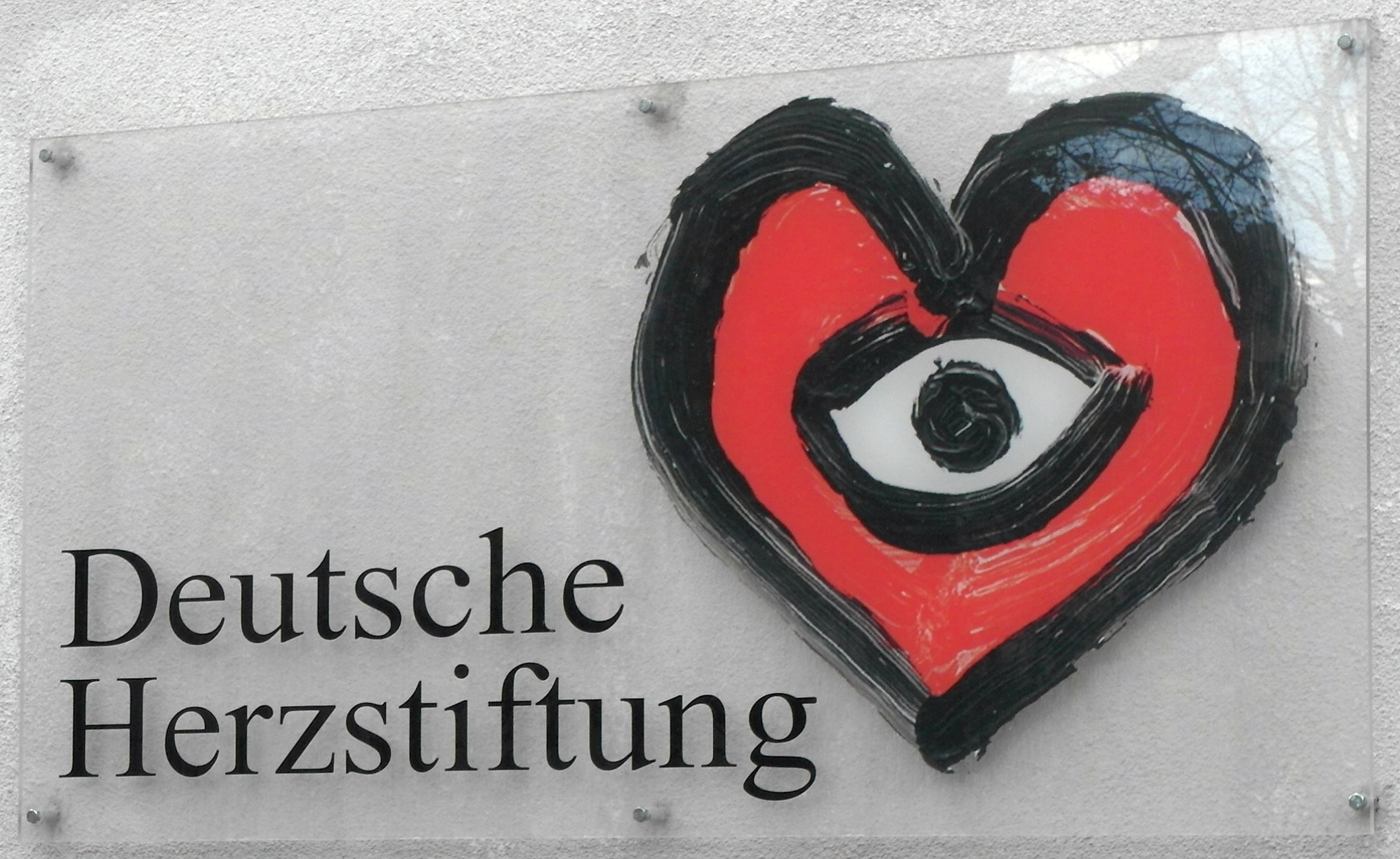
heart logo, created by Piatti for the German Heart Foundation, Frankfurt

In 1961 Piatti became the designer for the newly founded Deutscher Taschenbuch Verlag (dtv) of Munich. As well as their cover designs, Piatti was responsible for the company's typography, signets, letterheads, advertisements and posters, giving the DTV catalogue a uniform identity which combined the International Typographic Style with quirky illustration. His distinctive covers used the sans-serif Akzidenz-Grotesk typeface in black against a white background. From 1961, beginning with Heinrich Böll's Irisches Tagebuch, to 1991, he designed almost all of DTV's publications, a total of more than 6,300 titles.

In 1987, the DTV produced a retrospective book about Piatti, entitled Celestino Piatti, Meister des graphischen Sinnbilds.

In addition to posters and books, his works also included stamps for the Swiss post office, (including a set marking the hundredth anniversary of the Gotthardbahn) lithographs, woodcuts and linocuts, stained glass, murals and other paintings, ceramics and sculptures.

== Style ==
Piatti's work is recognised for its simple broad black outlines of figures that contain great detail and smaller shapes of vivid colour. Images are often set against a white background.

A motif that runs through his entire work, is the owl, as a messenger of good luck or misfortune, or as a symbol of wisdom. In 1992 Piatti told a magazine: "You can draw an owl a thousand times, and never find out its secret".

== Books by Piatti ==
- The Happy Owls (1963)
- Celestino Piatti's Animal ABC. (1965)
- Celestino Piatti's Animals (1966)
- Animal ABC (1966)
- Piatti: The Nock Family Circus (1968)
- The Holy Night: The Story of the First Christmas (1968)
- The Golden Apple (1970)
- The Little Crayfish (1974)
- Barbara and the Dormouse (1976)

== Posters ==
30 of Piatti's 500 posters were awarded "Best Swiss poster of the Year".

In 1971 Piatti was commissioned by the American Congress of Racial Equality (CORE) to design a 30" x 45" poster to promote the closed circuit viewing at the State Armoury in Harlem of the March 8 Muhammad Ali vs. Joe Frazier fight at Madison Square Garden. It features Ali's face as a boxing glove with eyes at the center and globe in a mouth.

== Death ==
Piatti died in Duggingen, Basel-Landschaft, Switzerland on December 17, 2007, at the age of 85
