= Lake Lucerne Navigation Company =

Company operating passenger ships and boats on Lake Lucerne, Switzerland

Schifffahrtsgesellschaft des Vierwaldstättersees
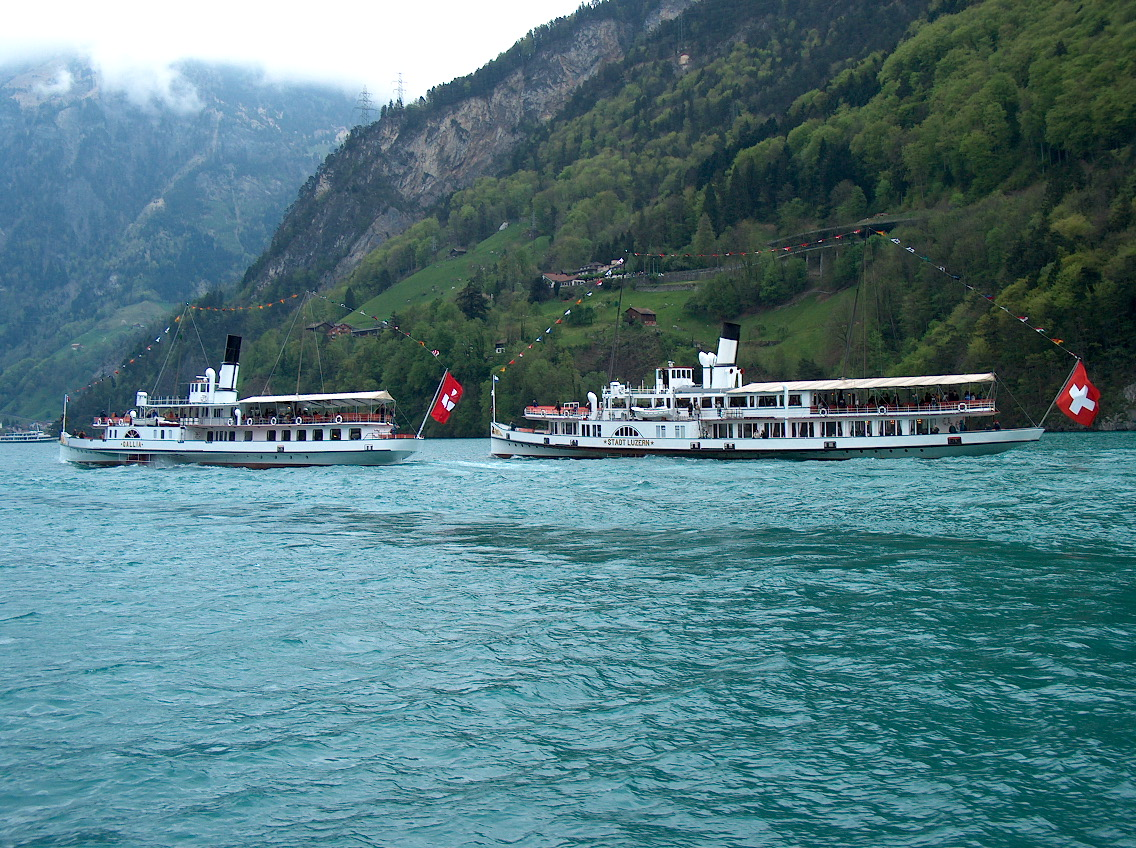
- Type: Aktiengesellschaft
- Industry: Transport
- Founded: 1836 (current name: 1960)
- Headquarters: Lucerne, Switzerland,
- Area served: Lake Lucerne
- Website: www.lakelucerne.ch

The Lake Lucerne Navigation Company (German: Schifffahrtsgesellschaft des Vierwaldstättersees) (commonly abbreviated to SGV) is a public Swiss company operating passenger ships and boats on Lake Lucerne. The company is based in the city of Lucerne, and its origins can be traced back to 1836. Today it is the largest inland shipping company in Switzerland, and is notable for operating a number of historic paddle steamers, in addition to more modern motor vessels.

The company provides public transport routes to 32 places along the shore of the lake, with interchange to both main line and mountain railways at various points. Whilst much usage of these services is tourist or leisure oriented, the company also continues to provide practical public transport links between the smaller lakeside communities.

The company also owns its own shipyard, Shiptec Lucerne, which undertakes new build and rebuild work both for the SGV and for other shipping companies.

== History ==
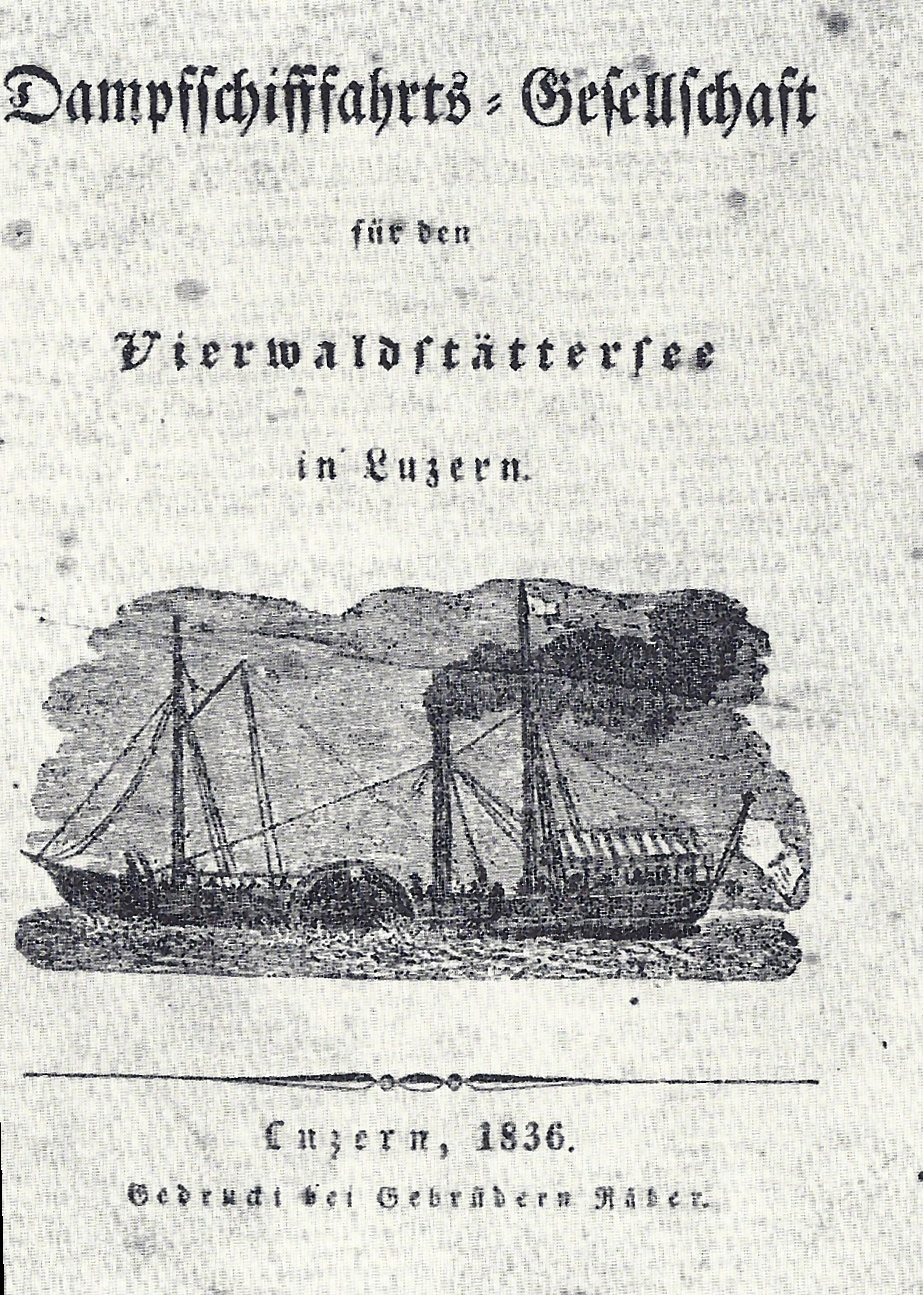
The original company's 1836 articles of association

Lake Lucerne has formed an important part of Switzerland's transport system for many centuries, and at least since the opening of the first track across the Gotthard Pass in 1230. This trade grew with the opening of a new mail coach road across the pass in 1830. This road had its northern terminus at Flüelen at the extreme eastern end of the lake, and the lake provided the only practical onward link to the cities of northern Switzerland.

In 1835, Casimir Friedrich Knörr decided to take advantage of the growing trade on Lake Lucerne by forming a steamship company and building a paddle steamer, the Stadt Luzern of 1837. His service began operating in 1837, although political pressure by the watermens guilds prevented it operating into the canton of Uri, and hence to Flüelen, for the first year of its operation.

Once this vessel showed the way, various other steamship companies were established. Eventually this led to price cutting, and several steamboat companies failed, or were merged into their rivals. In 1870, the two oldest and largest companies merged to form the Vereinigten Dampfschiffgesellschaft des Vierwaldstättersees (United Steamboat Company of Lake Lucerne). In 1885, this was renamed the Dampfschiffgesellschaft des Vierwaldstättersees (Steamship Company of Lake Lucerne; DGV), and in 1960 it became the SGV.

== Fleet ==
A fleet of 21 passenger ships, including five historical paddle steamers and 16 motor vessels of various ages and sizes is operated by the Schifffahrtsgesellschaft des Vierwaldstättersees. SGV's flagship is the paddle steamer Stadt Luzern.

| Name | Type | Built in | Passengers | Builder | Engine | Named after | Image |
|---|---|---|---|---|---|---|---|
| Uri | Paddle steamer | 1901 | 800 | | 650 horsepower (480 kW) | Canton of Uri | |
| Unterwalden | Paddle steamer | 1902 | 700 | Escher Wyss & Cie. | 650 horsepower (480 kW) | Canton of Unterwalden | |
| Schiller | Paddle steamer | 1906 | 900 | | 700 horsepower (520 kW) | Friedrich Schiller | |
| Gallia | Paddle steamer | 1913 | 900 | Escher Wyss & Cie. | 1,100 horsepower (820 kW) | Gaul | |
| Reuss | Motor vessel | 1926 | 135 | | 220 horsepower (160 kW) | Reuss river | |
| Rütenen | Motor vessel | 1926 | 60 | | 100 horsepower (75 kW) | | |
| Stadt Luzern | Paddle steamer | 1928 | 1200 | | 1,300 horsepower (970 kW) | City of Lucerne | |
| Rütli | Motor vessel | 1929 | 140 | | 220 horsepower (160 kW) | Rütli meadow | |
| Mythen | Motor vessel | 1931 | 200 | | 440 horsepower (330 kW) | Mythen mountain | |
| Titlis | Motor vessel | 1951 | 300 | | 480 horsepower (360 kW) | Titlis mountain | |
| Rigi | Motor vessel | 1955 | 600 | | 900 horsepower (670 kW) | Rigi mountain | |
| Schwyz | Motor vessel | 1959 | 1000 | | 900 horsepower (670 kW) | Canton of Schwyz | |
| Winkelried | Motor vessel | 1963 | 700 | | 1,200 horsepower (890 kW) | Winkelried family | |
| Gotthard | Motor vessel | 1970 | 700 | | 1,200 horsepower (890 kW) | Gotthard pass | |
| Europa | Motor vessel | 1976 | 1000 | | 1,200 horsepower (890 kW) | Europe | |
| Weggis | Motor vessel | 1990 | 400 | | 708 horsepower (528 kW) | Weggis village | |
| Brunnen | Motor vessel | 1991 | 400 | | 708 horsepower (528 kW) | Brunnen village | |
| Flüelen | Motor vessel | 1991 | 400 | | 708 horsepower (528 kW) | Flüelen village | |
| Waldstätter | Motor vessel | 1998 | 700 | | 1,200 horsepower (890 kW) | The Waldstätte | |
| Cirrus | Motor vessel | 2009 | 300 | | 986 horsepower (735 kW) | Cirrus cloud | |
| Saphir | Motor vessel | 2012 | 300 | | 625 horsepower (466 kW) | Sapphire gem | |
| Diamant | Motor vessel | 2017 | 400 | Shiptec Lucerne | Hybrid: diesel 1,220 horsepower (910 kW), electric 480 horsepower (360 kW) | Diamond gem | |
| Bürgenstock | Motor vessel | 2018 | 300 | Shiptec Lucerne | | Bürgenstock | |

== Routes ==
Routes
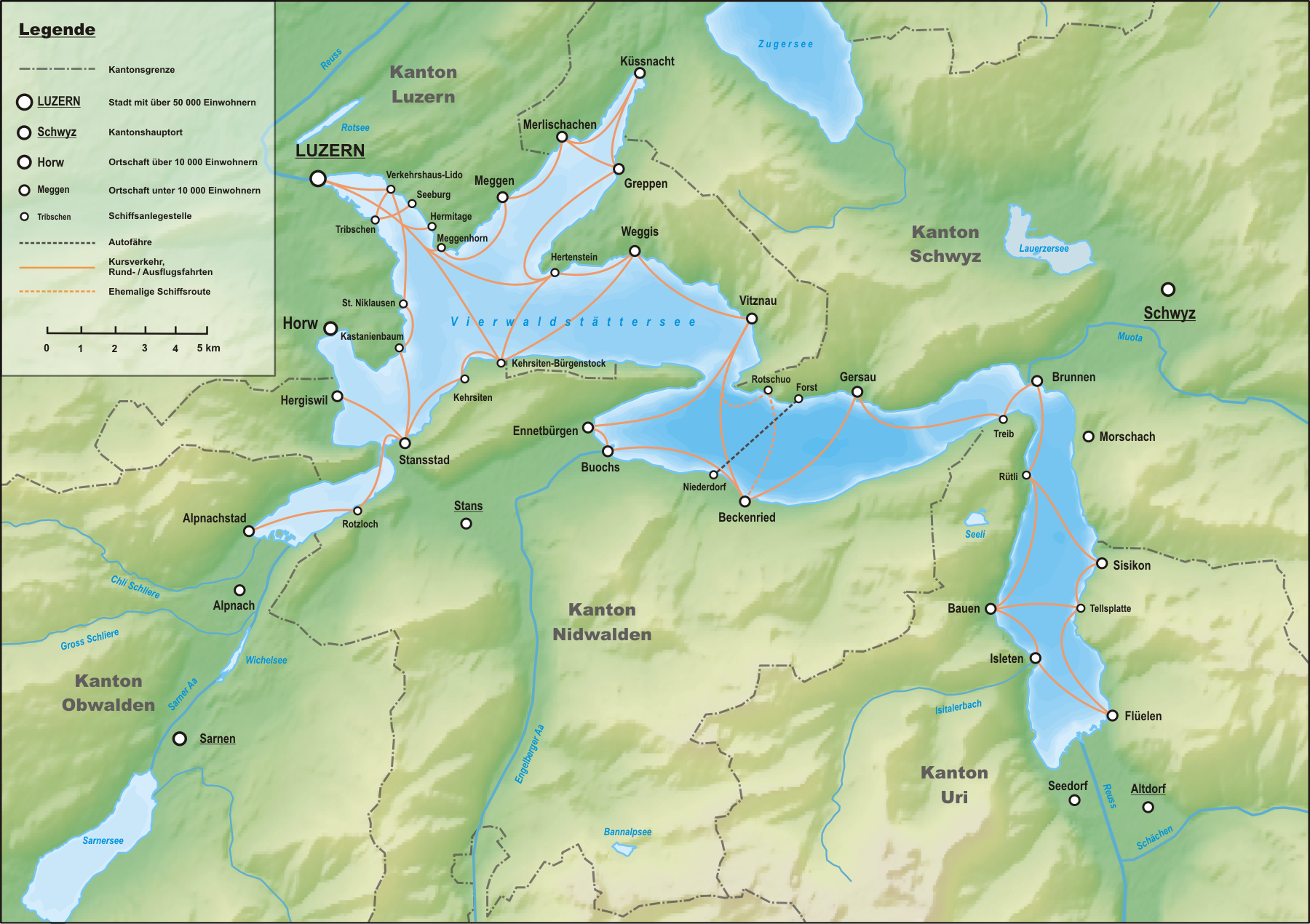
- SGV shipping routes on Lake Lucerne; the car ferry (autofähre) is not an SGV service

The SGV operates several routes, with many variants, on Lake Lucerne. The following places are served, listed here in clockwise order around the lake shore from Lucerne:

- Lucerne
- Verkehrshaus
- Seeburg
- Meggenhorn
- Meggen
- Merlischachen
- Küssnacht (landing stage)
- Greppen
- Hertenstein
- Weggis
- Vitznau
- Gersau
- Brunnen
- Sisikon
- Tellsplatte
- Flüelen
- Seedorf
- Isleten
- Bauen
- Rütli
- Treib
- Beckenried
- Buochs
- Kehrsiten-Bürgenstock
- Kehrsiten-Dorf
- Stansstad
- Rotzloch
- Alpnachstad
- Hergiswil
- Kastanienbaum
- St. Niklausen
- Tribschen

Not all services serve all stops, nor are they necessarily served in the order presented above.

The SGV operates both historic paddle steamers and more modern motor vessels on its scheduled services. Whilst either kind of ship may operate an individual service, the company publishes in advance those services for which it is planning to use paddle steamers.

The SGV services are well integrated with other public transport and tourist services. The landing stages at Lucerne and Flüelen provide 'cross-quay' interchange with the main line railways at Lucerne station and Flüelen station respectively. Similar links are available to the Pilatus rack railway at Alpnachstad station, the Vitznau–Rigi railway line at Vitznau, the Treib–Seelisberg funicular at Treib and the Bürgenstock funicular at Kehrsiten-Bürgenstock.

=== Gotthard Panorama Express ===
The interchange at Flüelen forms a key part of the Gotthard Panorama Express, a tourist oriented combined paddle steamer and rail service that connects Lucerne and Lugano. The SGV provides the link from Lucerne to Flüelen, connecting there with a Swiss Federal Railways train to Lugano.

== See also ==
- The Beckenried–Gersau car ferry
- Transport in Switzerland
