= Konrad Farner =

Swiss art historian

Konrad Farner (11 July 1903 – 3 April 1974) was a Swiss art historian and socialist intellectual.

== Biography ==
Farner was born in to an old and prominent Protestant Zurich family and was the son of a surveyor. He attended primary school and high school in Lucerne and studied art history and history in Frankfurt, Munich and Cologne from 1922 to 1924. After working as an antiquarian and art expert for the first few years, he studied political science, history, literature and theology under Karl Barth and Edgar Salin in Basel from 1936 to 1941. From 1924 he was a member of the Communist Party of Switzerland.

After the Second World War, Farner and his teacher in legal philosophy Arthur Baumgarten became founding members of the Labour Party of Switzerland.

After his studies, Farner worked as a publishing editor and without a permanent job during the Cold War, he also worked freelance. After the suppression of Hungarian uprising in 1956, Farner and his family in Thalwil were attacked by an anti-communist rioters after the NZZ had published their address. In 1969 he left the PdA and became closer to Maoism. In 1972 he returned to academia thanks to the support of students in the 1968 protests and was given a teaching post for art history at the University of Zurich.

From 1949 he had been as advocate to promote dialogue between Marxists and Christians.
