= Flüelen =

- Municipality
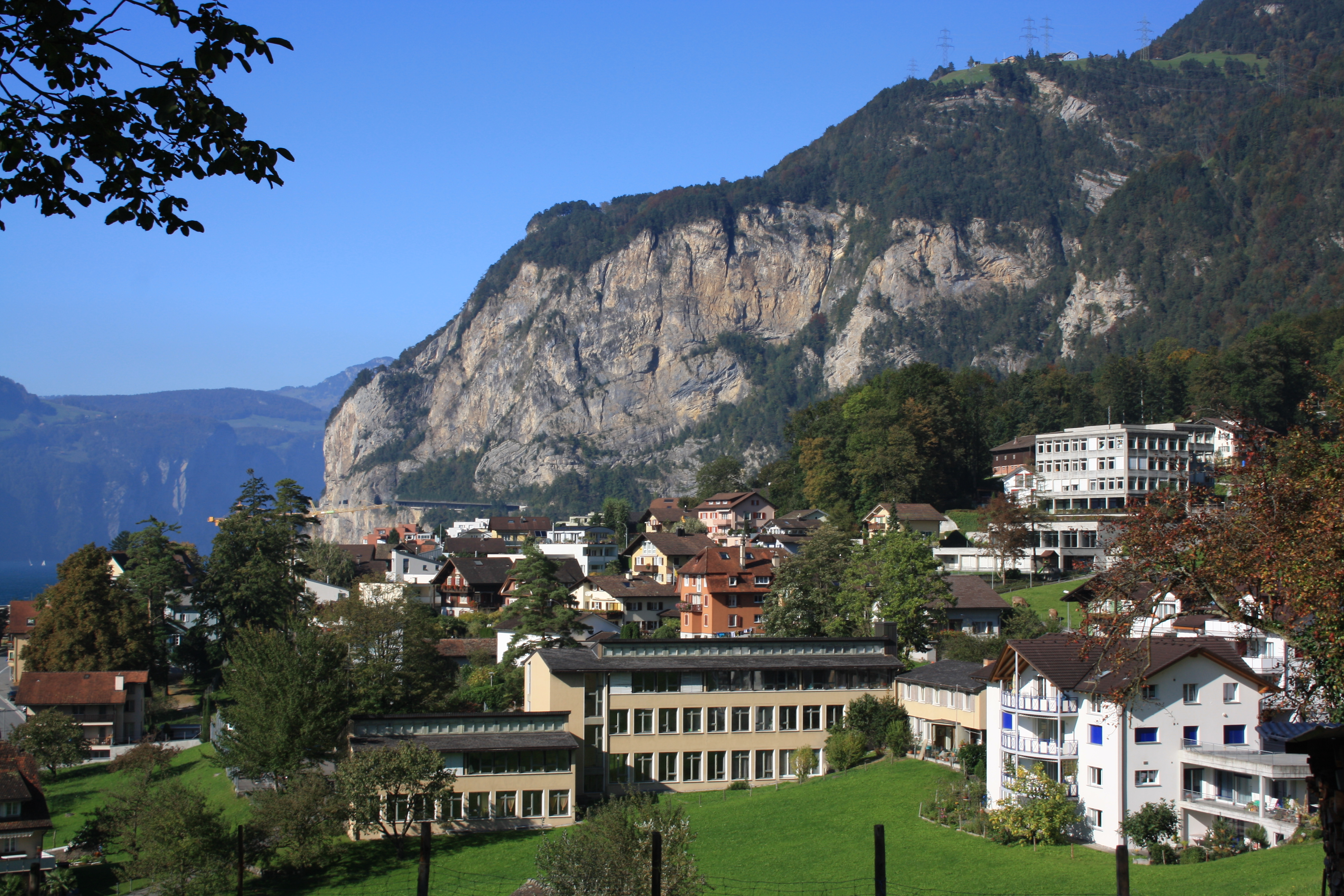

- Coat of arms
- Location of Flüelen
- Location within Switzerland Location within Canton of Uri
- Coordinates: 46°54′N 8°37′E
- Country: Switzerland
- Canton: Uri
- District: n.a.

Area
  - Total: 12.42 km^{2} (4.80 sq mi)
- Elevation: 435 m (1,427 ft)

Population (Dec 2015)
  - Total: 1,972
  - Density: 158.8/km^{2} (411.2/sq mi)
- Time zone: UTC+01:00 (CET)
  - Summer (DST): UTC+02:00 (CEST)
- Postal code: 6454
- SFOS number: 1207
- ISO 3166 code: CH-UR
- Surrounded by: Altdorf, Bauen, Bürglen, Isenthal, Seedorf, Sisikon
- Website: www.fluelen.ch

Flüelen is a municipality in the canton of Uri in Switzerland.

== History ==
Flüelen harbor with light boats from the Lake Lucerne trade routes unloading, 1817

Aerial view from 300 m by Walter Mittelholzer (1922)

Flüelen is first mentioned in 1266 as Vluolon.

Flüelen formed an important transshipment point on Switzerland's transport system for many centuries, and at least since the opening of the first track across the Gotthard Pass in 1230. The various routes across the pass reached Lake Lucerne at Flüelen, and until the latter half of the 19th century the lake provided the best onward link to the cities of northern Switzerland. In the 13th century the Castle of Rudenz was built in Flüelen as an Imperial customs post to collect customs fees from the Gotthard traffic.

== Geography ==
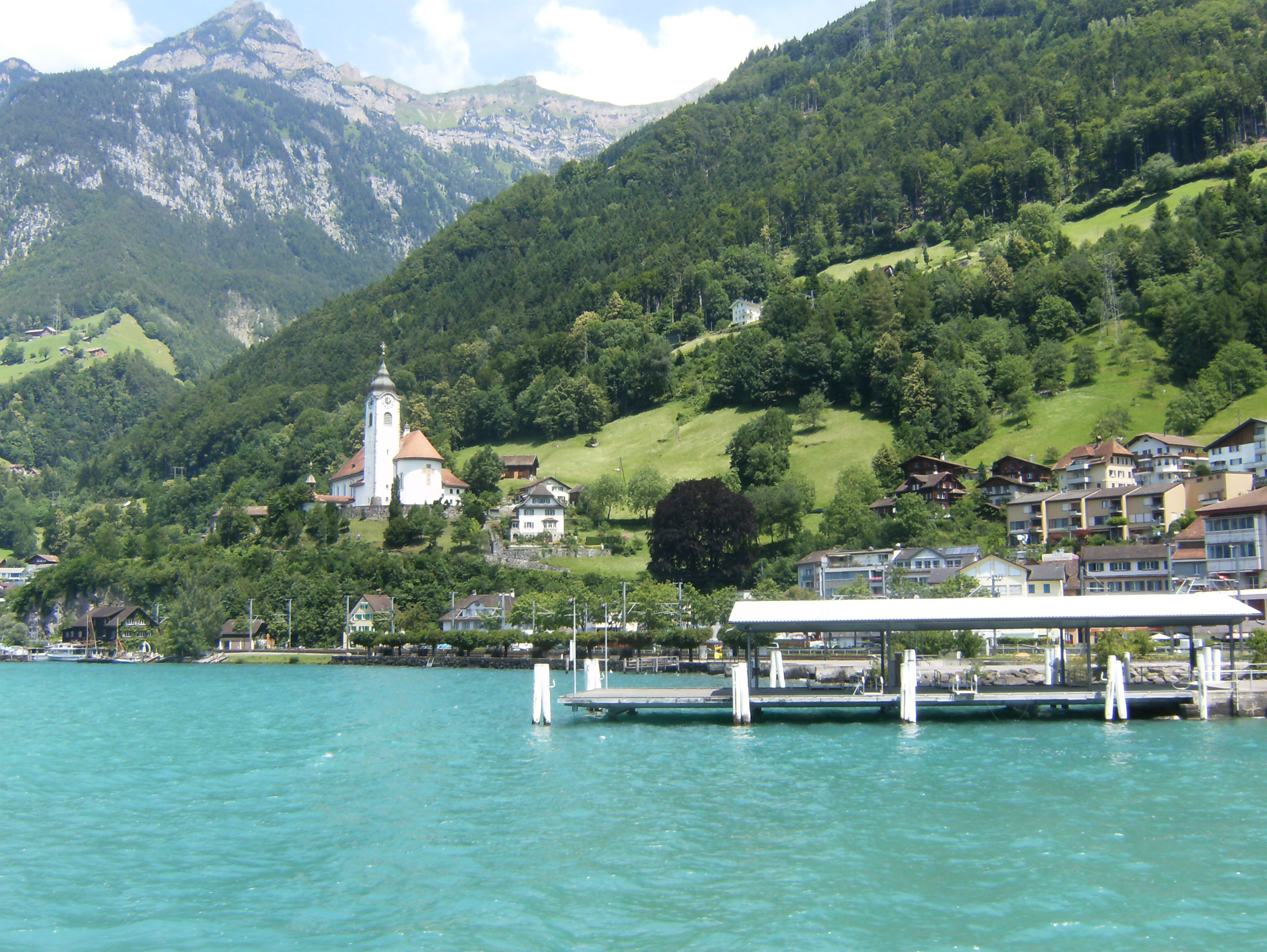
Flüelen village and the harbor

Flüelen has an area (as of the 2004/09 survey) of 12.38 km^{2} (4.78 sq mi). Of this area, about 23.9% is used for agricultural purposes, while 58.1% is forested. Of the rest of the land, 6.4% is settled (buildings or roads) and 11.6% is unproductive land. In the 2004/09 survey a total of 45 ha (110 acres) or about 3.6% of the total area was covered with buildings, an increase of 7 ha (17 acres) over the 1981/85 amount. Over the same time period, the amount of recreational space in the municipality increased by 2 ha (4.9 acres) and is now about 0.56% of the total area. Of the agricultural land 90 ha (220 acres) is fields and grasslands and 285 ha (700 acres) consists of alpine grazing areas. Since 1981/85 the amount of agricultural land has decreased by 16 ha (40 acres). Over the same time period the amount of forested land has increased by 7 ha (17 acres). Rivers and lakes cover 9 ha (22 acres) in the municipality.

The municipality is located along Lake Lucerne. It developed as a transshipment point on the trade routes over the Gotthard pass and along the lake. It consists of the village of Flüelen, the outer village settlements and scattered farm houses in the valley and up the mountain sides.

== Demographics ==
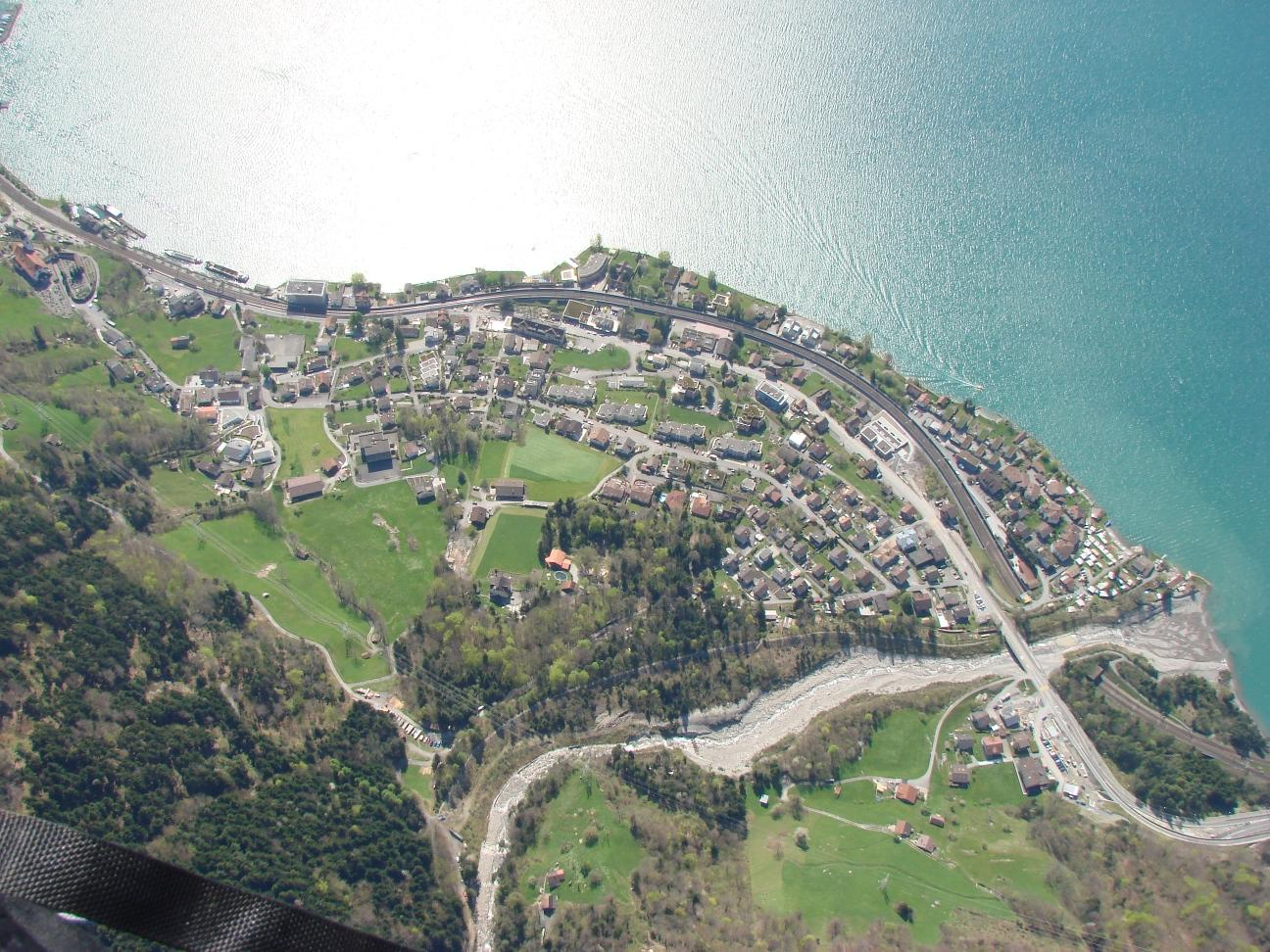
Aerial view of Flüelen

Flüelen has a population (as of December 2020) of 2,025. As of 2014, 13.3% of the population are resident foreign nationals. Over the last 4 years (2010-2014) the population has changed at a rate of 0.46%. The birth rate in the municipality, in 2014, was 7.1, while the death rate was 10.1 per thousand residents.

As of 2014, children and teenagers (0–19 years old) make up 21.7% of the population, while adults (20–64 years old) are 59.2% and seniors (over 64 years old) make up 19.1%. In 2015 there were 844 single residents, 901 people who were married or in a civil partnership, 113 widows or widowers and 114 divorced residents.

In 2014 there were 823 private households in Flüelen with an average household size of 2.35 persons. Of the 369 inhabited buildings in the municipality, in 2000, about 37.1% were single family homes and 39.3% were multiple family buildings. Additionally, about 22.0% of the buildings were built before 1919, while 11.1% were built between 1991 and 2000. In 2013 the rate of construction of new housing units per 1000 residents was 2.52. The vacancy rate for the municipality, in 2015, was 2.45%.

Most of the population (as of 2000) speaks German (93.6%), with Italian being second most common (2.0%) and Albanian being third (1.6%). As of 2007 the gender distribution of the population was 50.3% male and 49.7% female.

== Historical population ==
The historical population is given in the following table:

year	population
1685	337
1743	372
1799	469
1850	600
1880	1,420
1900	941
1950	1,645
2000	1,787
2005	1,874
2007	1,897

== Economy ==
Flüelen is an industrial-tertiary municipality, or a municipality where agriculture and manufacturing play a minor role in the economy. The municipality is part of the agglomeration of Altdorf.

As of 2014, there were a total of 841 people employed in the municipality. Of these, a total of 59 people worked in 14 businesses in the primary economic sector. The secondary sector employed 291 workers in 24 separate businesses. There were 7 small businesses with a total of 168 employees and one mid sized business with a total of 87 employees. Finally, the tertiary sector provided 491 jobs in 91 businesses. There were 9 small businesses with a total of 233 employees and one mid sized business with a total of 80 employees.

In 2014 a total of 2.5% of the population received social assistance.

In 2015 local hotels had a total of 12,467 overnight stays, of which 74.8% were international visitors.

== Politics ==
In the 2015 federal election the most popular party was the SVP with 49.4% of the vote. The next three most popular parties were the GPS (29.4%), the CVP (15.8%) and the Übrige (5.4%). In the federal election, a total of 830 votes were cast, and the voter turnout was 59.8%. The 2015 election saw a large change in the voting when compared to 2011. The percentage of the vote received by the CVP increased sharply from 0.0% in 2011 to 15.8% in 2015 The percentage of the vote received by the SVP increased sharply from 0.0% in 2011 to 49.4% in 2015 The percentage of the vote received by the GPS increased sharply from 0.0% in 2011 to 29.4% in 2015.

In the 2007 federal election the FDP which received 87.7% of the vote.

== Education ==
In Flüelen about 65.8% of the population (between age 25-64) have completed either non-mandatory upper secondary education or additional higher education (either university or a Fachhochschule).

== Crime ==
In 2014 the crime rate, of the over 200 crimes listed in the Swiss Criminal Code (running from murder, robbery and assault to accepting bribes and election fraud), in Flüelen was 44.3 per thousand residents, which is only 68.6% of the average rate in the entire country. During the same period, the rate of drug crimes was 2 per thousand residents, or about one-fifth the national rate. However, the rate of violations of immigration, visa and work permit laws was 11.6 per thousand residents, which is 136.7% greater than the average rate in the entire country.

== Transport ==
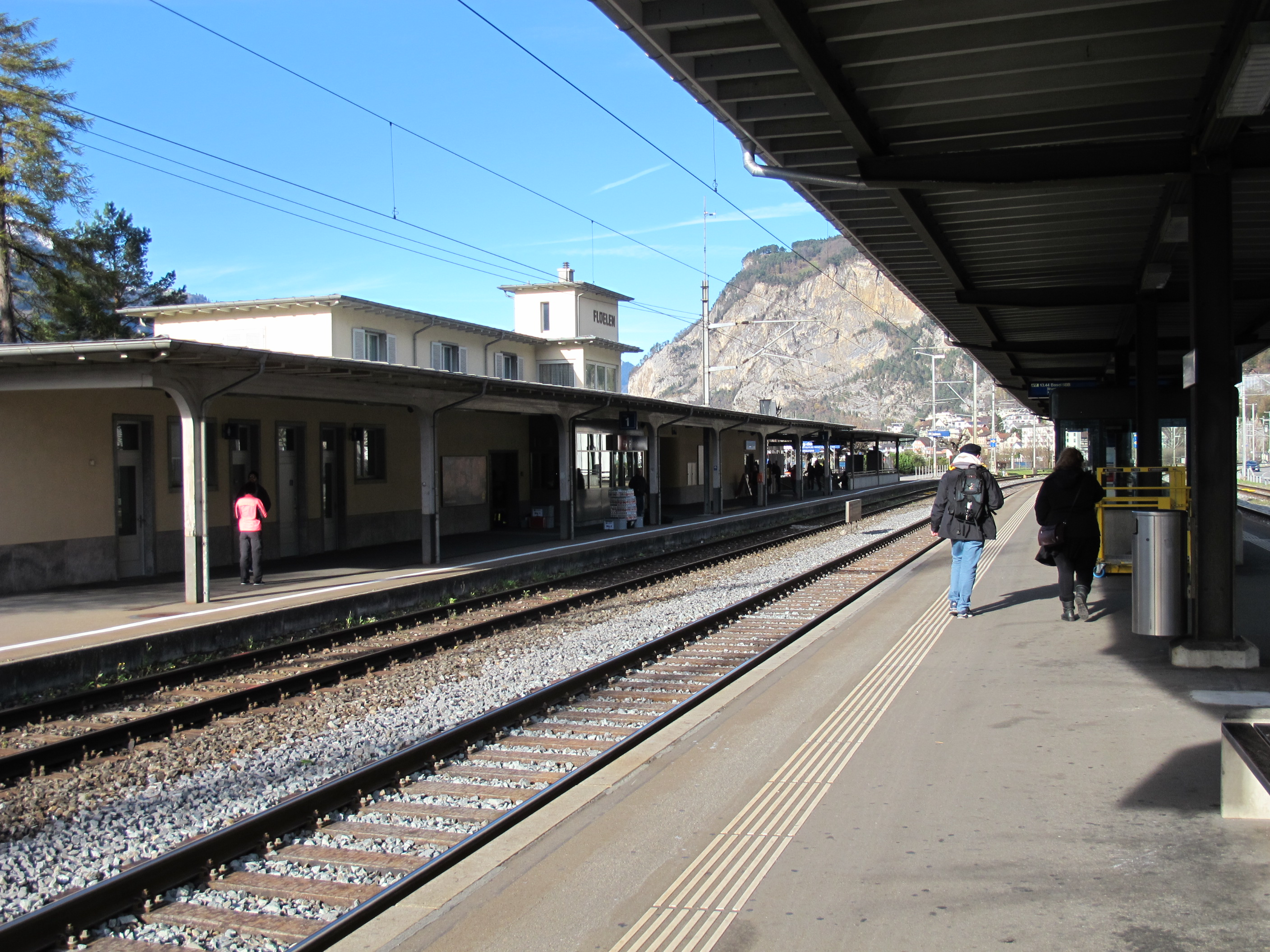
Flüelen railway station

Flüelen railway station, on the Gotthard railway, is served by hourly InterRegio trains, and by line S2 of the Stadtbahn Zug, which operates hourly between Zug, Arth-Goldau and Erstfeld. The adjacent steamer pier is served by steamer services to and from Lucerne that are provided by the Schifffahrtsgesellschaft des Vierwaldstättersees (Lake Lucerne Navigation Company; SGV). In 1906, the Altdorf–Flüelen tramway was constructed to connect the centre of Altdorf with Fluelen railway station. The electric tramway operated until 1951, when it was replaced by a bus service.
