= Freethinkers Association of Switzerland =

Swiss organization promoting freethought and humanism

Freethinkers Association of Switzerland Freidenker-Vereinigung der Schweiz Association suisse des libres penseurs Associazione svizzera dei liberi pensatori
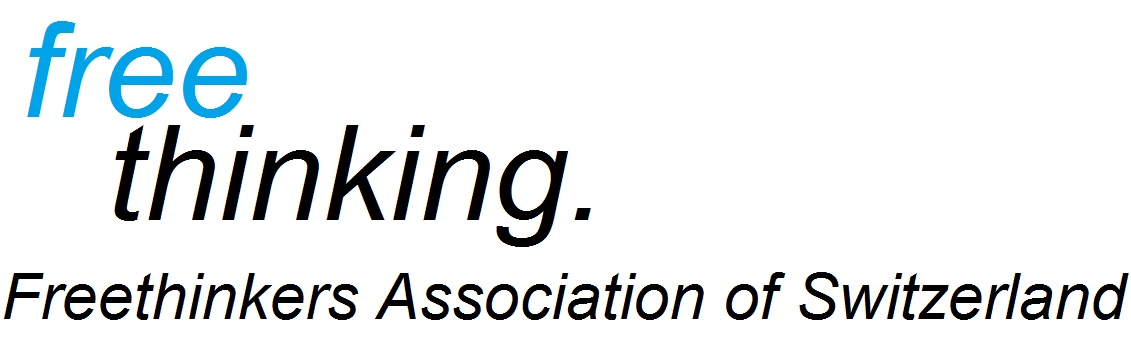
- English logo of the association.
- Abbreviation: (in English) FAS (in German) FVS (in French and Italian) ASLP
- Formation: 1908
- Purpose: To promote freethought and humanism
- Headquarters: Bern
- Region served: Switzerland
- Official language: German, French and Italian
- President: Andreas Kyriacou
- Website: www.frei-denken.ch/en

The Freethinkers Association of Switzerland (FAS) is a Swiss nonprofit organisation for freethought. It is the result of the merger of several late 19th century and early 20th century local freethinkers associations throughout Switzerland into a national society, currently headquartered in Bern.

== History ==
With the introduction of cantonal church taxes in the 1870s, anti-clericals began to organise themselves. Around 1870, a "freethinkers club" was founded in Zürich. During the debate on the Zürich church law in 1883, professor Friedrich Salomon Vögelin and city council member Kunz proposed to separate church and state.

The Deutschschweizer Freidenker-Vereinigung ("German Swiss Freethinkers Association") was founded in 1908, merged with freethought groups in the Francophone region of Romandy and the Italian-speaking Canton of Ticino, and forged close ties to the freethought movement in Germany (see German Freethinkers League). In the beginning, the association grew rapidly; the First World War caused the growth to stagnate, however. During the Interwar Period, a new upswing followed until the Great Depression and Second World War brought new setbacks.

In 1933, National Councillor Hans Müller launched an attack on the freethinkers as a movement that actively fought against the Christian faith, and would thereby threaten religious peace. The attack, in the form of a motion, was adopted as a bill by the National Council on 22 June 1933 with 70 against 47 votes, but subsequently defeated in the Federal Council. Important Swiss freethinkers were pedagogue Ernst Brauchlin, businessman Otto Kunz and writer Jakob Stebler; socialist intellectual Konrad Farner was connected to the association. In 2011, the Freethinkers Association of Switzerland had about 1800 members.

== Freethinker Prize ==
On 9 October 2015, the Swiss Freethinkers awarded the Freethinker Prize of 10,000 Swiss francs for the first time. It was bestowed upon Ensaf Haidar, Raif Badawi and Waleed Abulkhair for their brave efforts for humanist and secular values in Saudi Arabia. The Freethinker Prize is financed via a bequest, and will be awarded every other year in the future.

== Publications ==
=== Magazines ===
- frei denken. (German, "free thinking."). Quarterly magazine since 2010, successor of
  - Der Schweizer Freidenker. Organ der Freidenker der deutschen Schweiz ("The Swiss Freethinker. Organ of German Switzerland's Freethinkers", 1918–21);
  - Geistesfreiheit: Organ der Freigeistigen Vereinigung der Schweiz ("Freedom of Thought: Organ of the Freethought Association of Switzerland", 1922–26);
  - Freidenker. Organ der Freigeistigen Vereinigung der Schweiz ("Freethinker. Organ of the Freethought Association of Switzerland", 1927–52);
  - Befreiung: Zeitschrift für kritisches Denken. Monatsschrift, hrsg. von der Freigeistigen Vereinigung der Schweiz und dem Deutschen Monistenbund ("Liberation: Magazine for Critical Thinking. Monthly magazine, published by the Freethought Association of Switzerland and the German Monist League", 1953–55); and
  - Freidenker. Monatsschrift der Freidenker-Vereinigung der Schweiz ("Freethinker. Monthly magazine of the Freethinkers Association of Switzerland", 1956–2010).
- Le libre penseur. (French, "The Free Thinker"). Quarterly magazine 1974–present (ISSN 0256-8985).
- Libero pensiero. (Italian, "Freethought"). Quarterly magazine 1982–1995, 2009–present.

=== Books ===
- Leo Heinrich Skrbensky. Die Kirche segnet den Eidbrüch: Das Vorspiel zur geistigen Verknechtung Oesterreichs. Freigeistige Vereinigung der Schweiz, 1935.
- Ernst Brauchlin. 13 Gespräche mit einem Freidenker. Freigeistige Vereinigung der Schweiz, 1953.
- Ernst Brauchlin. Gott sprach zu sich selber. Freigeistige Vereinigung der Schweiz, 1959.

=== Articles ===
- Erklärung der freigeistigen Vereinigung der Schweiz. In: Zofinger Tagblatt, 17. Oktober 1963.

== Literature ==
- W. Baumgartner: Freidenkertum gestern und heute. 1983
- Robert Barth: Freidenker – Monisten – Gottlose. In: Theologische Zeitschrift. 41, 1985, S. 412–433.
- Georg Schmid, Oswald Eggenberger: Kirchen, Sekten, Religionen. Religiöse Gemeinschaften, weltanschauliche Gruppierungen und Psycho-Organisationen im deutschen Sprachraum: ein Handbuch. Theologischer Verlag Zürich (TVZ), Zürich 2003, S. 466.
