= Scheidegg (Rigi) =

Mountain in Switzerland

- Rigi Scheidegg (cable car station)
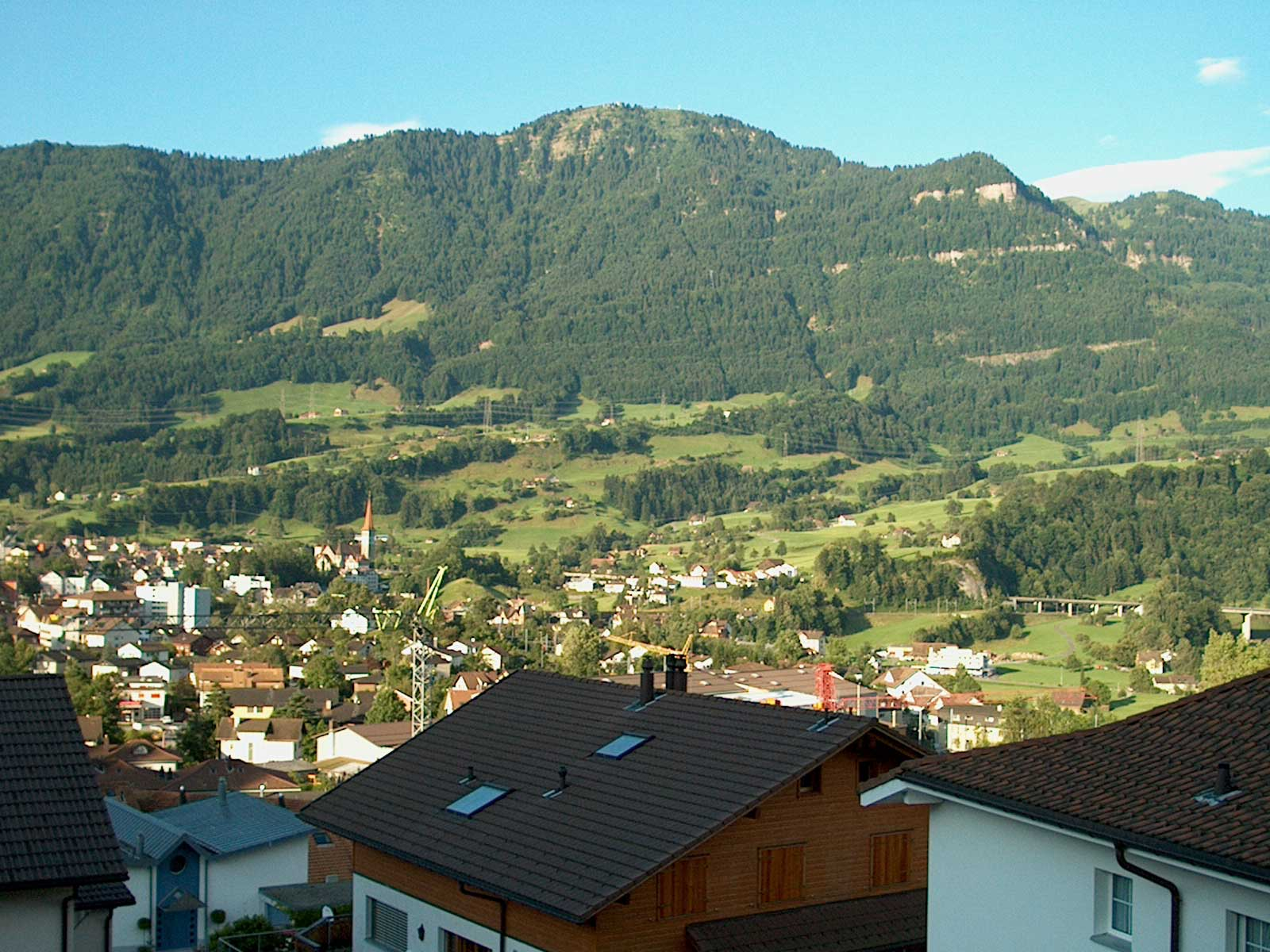
- View from Goldau

Highest point
- Elevation: 1,659 m (5,443 ft)
- Prominence: 114 m (374 ft)
- Parent peak: Dosse
- Coordinates: 47°01′39″N 08°31′12″E

Geography
- Location within Switzerland Location within Canton of Schwyz
- Country: Switzerland
- Canton: Schwyz
- Parent range: Schwyzer Alps
- Topo map: Swiss Federal Office of Topography swisstopo

The Scheidegg (Swiss Standard German pronunciation: [ˈʃaɪdɛg]; 1,659 m or 5,443 ft) is a mountain summit of the Rigi massif, overlooking Goldau in the canton of Schwyz on its north mountainside, and Gersau and the Gersau Bay (Gersauerbecken) of Lake of Lucerne on its south side. The cable car station 160 metres (520 ft) to the east of the summit is called Rigi Scheidegg.

== Transport ==
The summit is connected by two cable cars, one, the Luftseilbahn Kräbel–Rigi Scheidegg (LKRS), on the north side connecting to the Kräbel station on the Arth-Rigi Bahn (ARB), and another one, the Luftseilbahn Obergschwend–Rigi Burggeist (LORB), on the south side leading down to Obergschwend in the municipality of Gersau. The valley station of the LORB is linked via a bus line with Gersau and its landing stage served by the Lake Lucerne Navigation Company.

Alternatively it is possible to walk from Scheidegg to Rigi Kaltbad or Rigi Klösterli by a panoramic footpath on the eastern and western mountainside of the Rigi massif. Much of the path uses the trackbed of the former Rigi–Scheidegg railway that once linked Kaltbad and Scheidegg.

== History ==
The summit of Scheidegg was once the site of a large hotel, built in 1830. The reduction in tourism due to World War I, and the subsequent change in tourism from overnight stays to day trips, resulted in the closure of the hotel and its eventual demolition in 1943/4.

The Cinema Museum in London has rare home movie footage of the town in 1946.

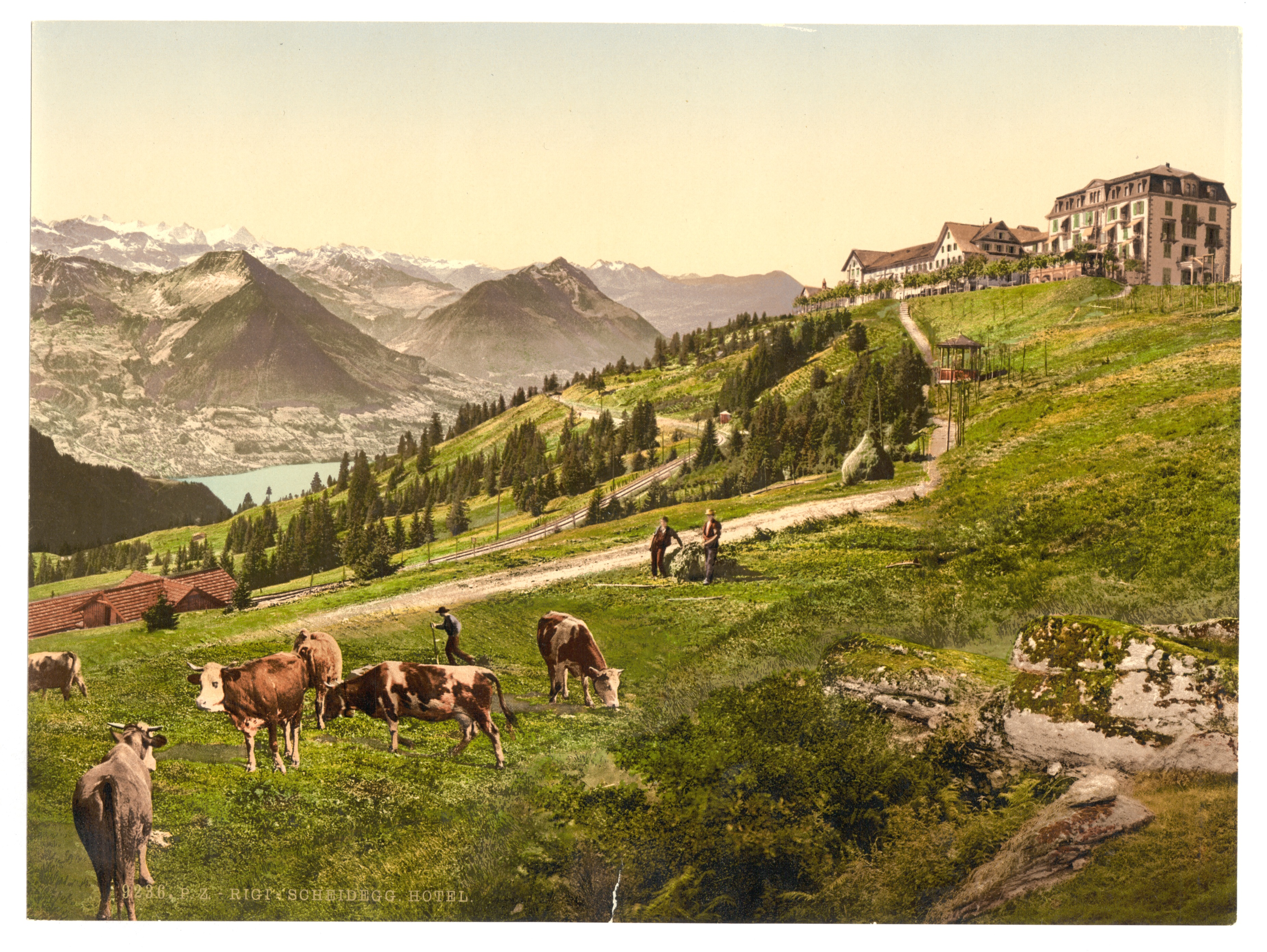
Scheidegg in the 1890s, showing the hotel that once occupied the peak.

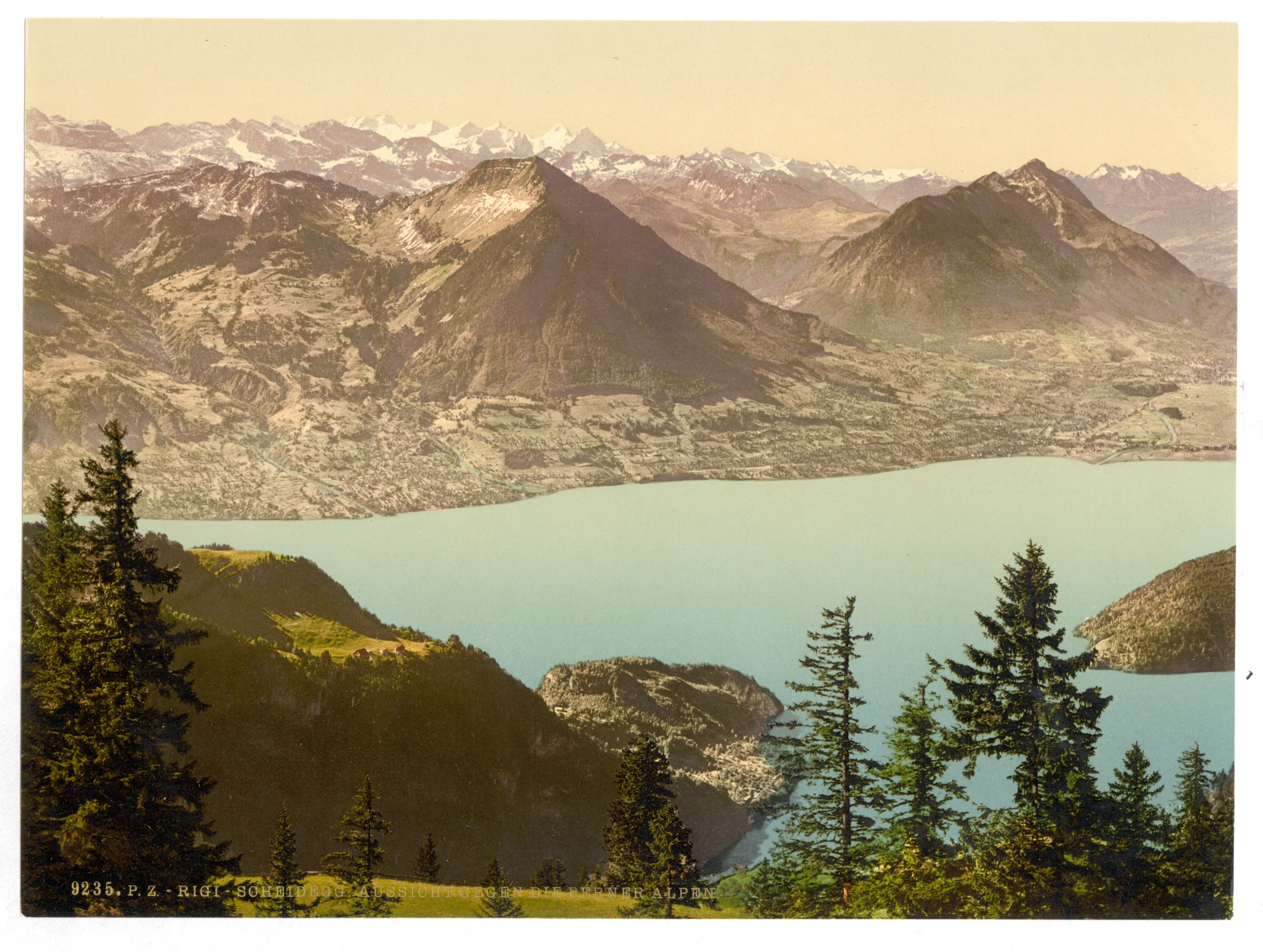
View from Scheidegg in the 1890s, looking towards the Oberland Alps.

== See also ==
- List of mountains of Switzerland accessible by public transport
- List of mountains of the canton of Schwyz
