= Dosse =

Dosse may refer to:

- Dosse (Rigi), a mountain of the Rigi massif in Switzerland
- Dosse (river), a tributary of the Havel in Germany

== People with the surname ==
- François Dosse, French historian and philosopher who specializes in intellectual history
- Marylène Dosse, French-born American classical pianist
- Philip Dosse, British publisher
