= Rigi–Scheidegg railway =

Former railway line in Switzerland

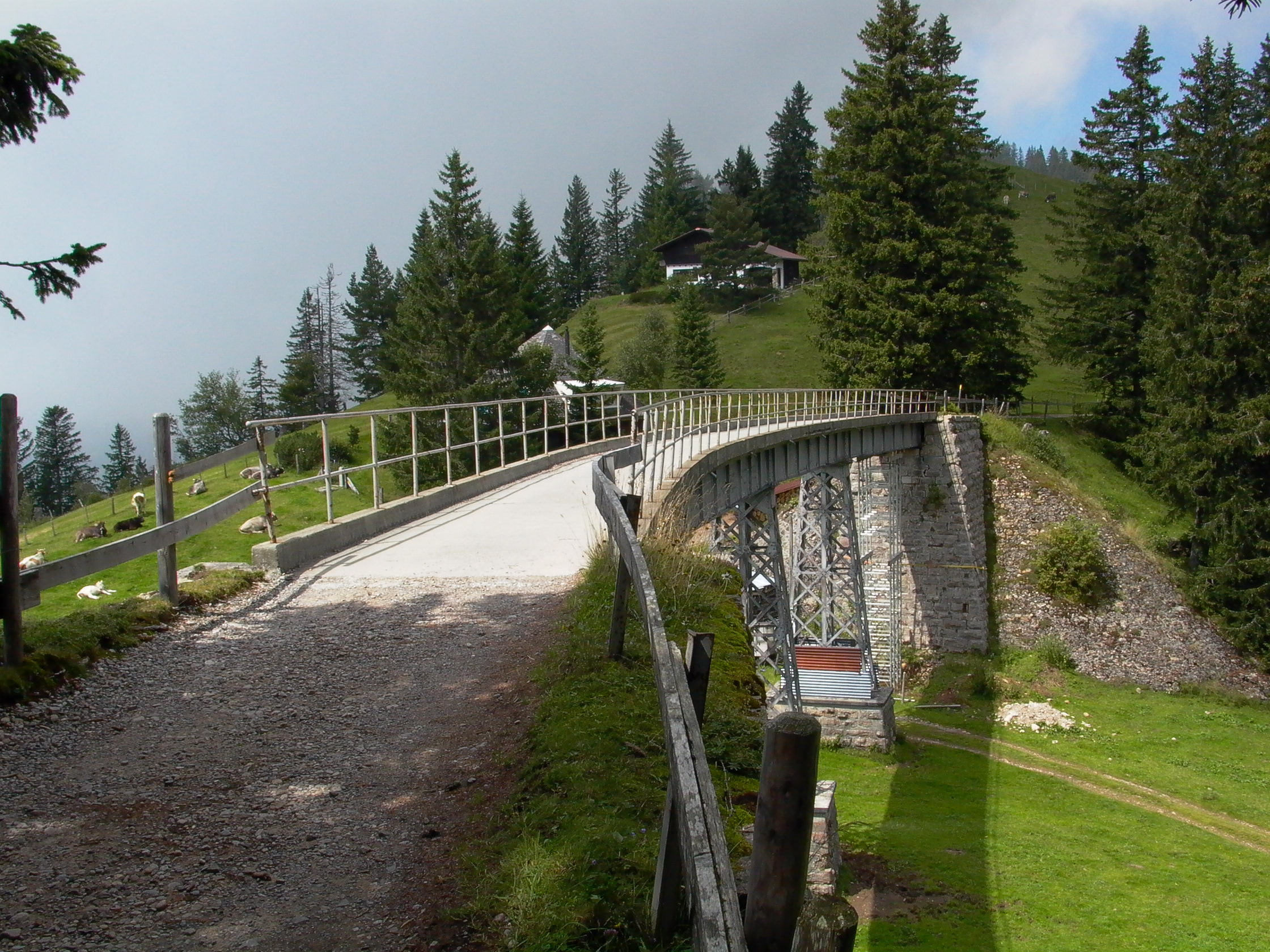
- Bridge of the former Rigi–Scheidegg Railway at Unterstetten

Overview
- Locale: Cantons of Lucerne and Schwyz; Switzerland
- Termini: Rigi Kaltbad; Scheidegg

Service
- Services: 1
- Depot(s): Rigi Kaltbad

History
- Opened: 14 July 1874 (Kaltbad-First); 1 June 1875 (First-Scheiddegg)
- Closed: 21 September 1931

Technical
- Line length: 6.7 km (4.2 mi)
- Character: Steam railway
- Track gauge: Metre (3 ft 3 3/8 in)
- Minimum radius: 105 metres (344 ft)
- Highest elevation: 1,607 m (5,272 ft)

The Rigi–Scheidegg railway (German: Rigi-Scheidegg-Bahn; RSB) is a former railway line built high on the Rigi massif on the cantonal border between Lucerne and Schwyz in Switzerland. Today the line's trackbed, which is 6.7 kilometres (4 mi) in length, and includes a 70-metre (230 ft) tunnel and several bridges, is a rail trail, which serves as a panoramic footpath in summer, and as a route for cross-country skiing in winter .

Even before the Vitznau–Rigi rack railway was opened in 1871, the Rigi Massif was a major tourist attraction, with a number of grand hotels occupying various locations on the massif. One of these was at the summit of the Scheidegg peak, which was not served by either the Vitznau–Rigi line or the Arth–Rigi rack railway that followed it. In order to provide easier access for its guests, the Rigi–Scheidegg railway was built to provide a link to Rigi Kaltbad on the Vitznau–Rigi line. The line opened in two stages, with the stage from Kaltbad to First opening on the 14 July 1874, and the section from First to Scheiddegg on the 1 June 1875.

Unlike the Vitznau–Rigi line, the Rigi–Scheidegg railway followed the contours near the top of the mountain, rather than climbing it, and was not a rack railway. It was built to 1,000 mm (3 ft 3 3/8 in) metre gauge, and so never made a direct connection to the standard gauge Vitznau–Rigi line. Instead, the two lines met at right angles, and provision was made for the transfer of passengers and goods. Although three steam locomotives were built by Swiss Locomotive and Machine Works (SLM) for the opening of the line, two were found sufficient to operate it, so the third sold to an unknown purchaser in 1884.

With the outbreak of World War I in 1914, the tourist industry collapsed and never recovered in the same form. When tourists did return to the mountains, they came as day trippers, meaning that the mountain-top hotels were no longer needed. That hit the Rigi–Scheidegg railway particularly hard, and the line closed on the 21 September 1931, never to reopen. The track was removed in 1942, and the line's two remaining steam locomotives were scrapped. Two of the line's passenger cars survive alongside the trackbed, converted into holiday homes, but all the buildings of the line have been demolished.

== Gallery ==
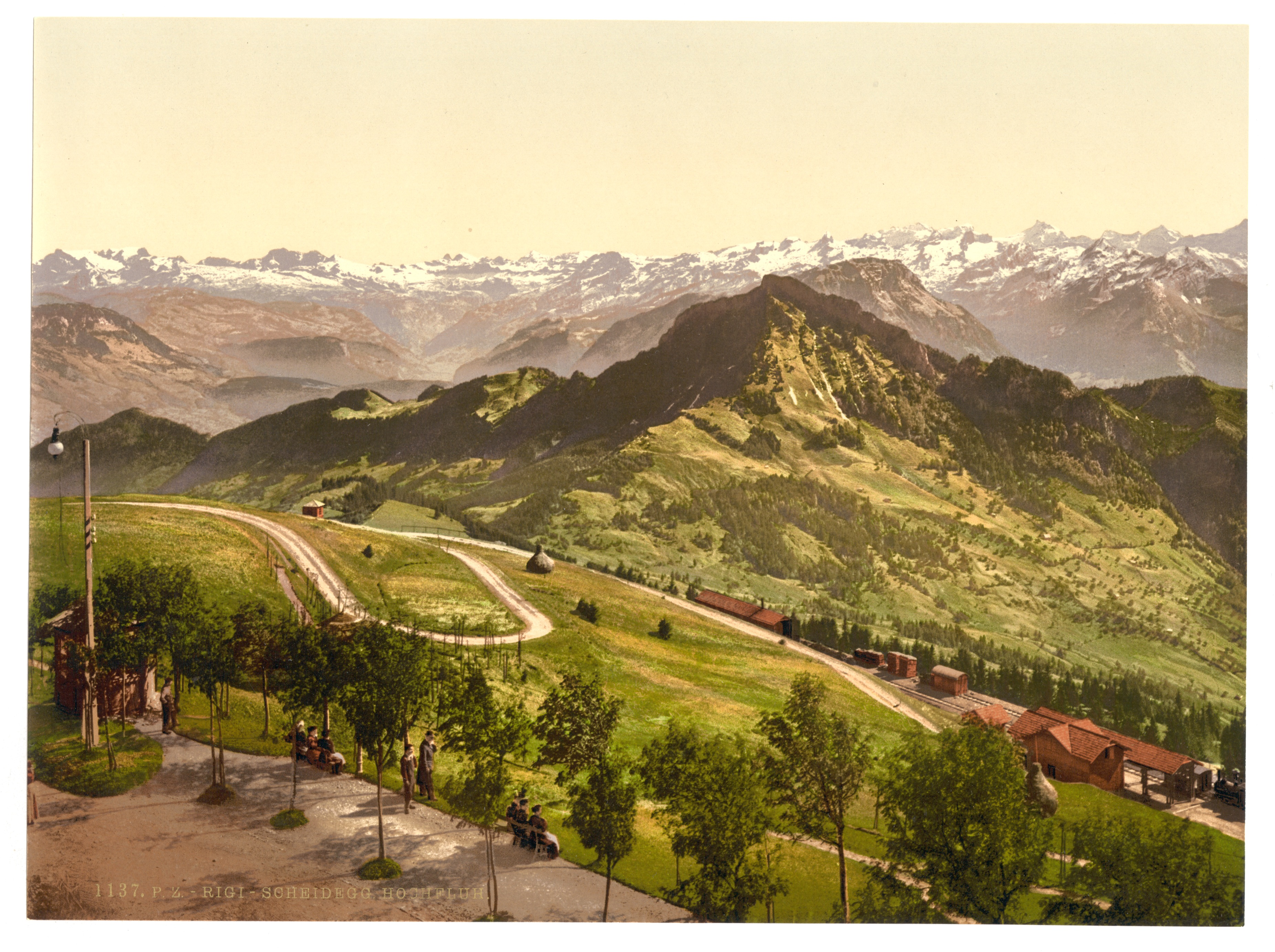
The railway station at Scheidegg, seen from the hotel, in the 1890s

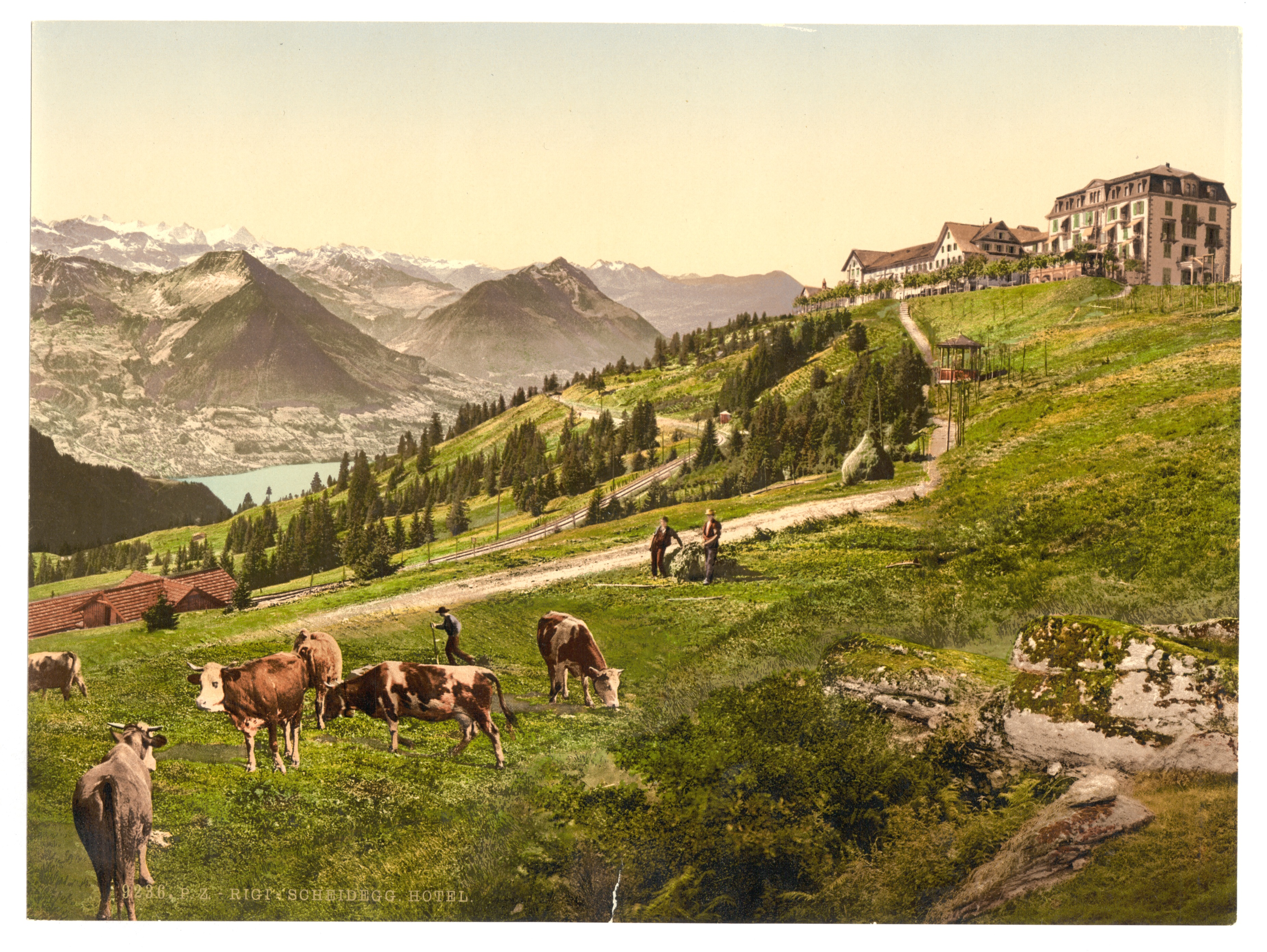
The hotel at Scheidegg, with the railway below, in the 1890s

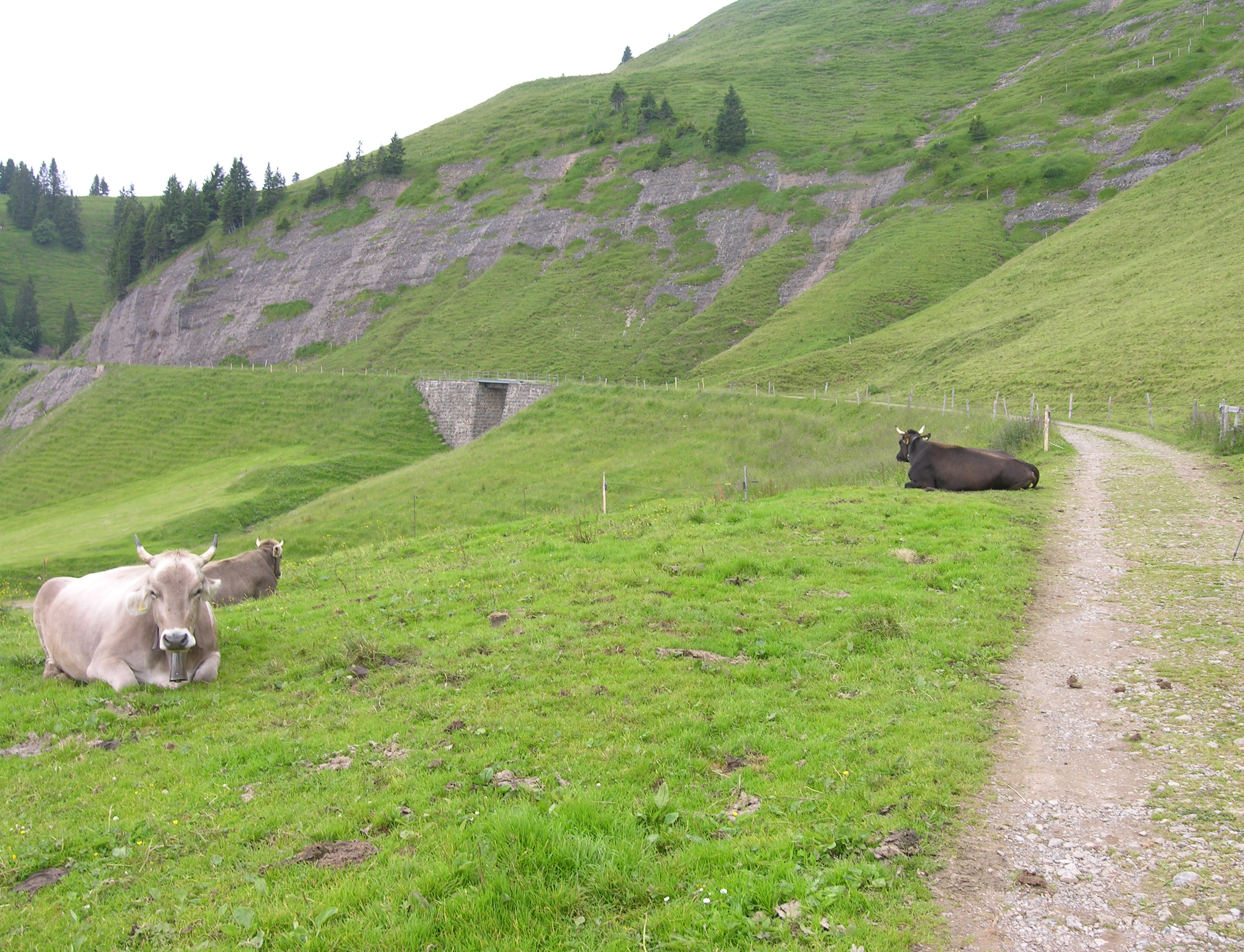
The right of way of the railway, in 2009

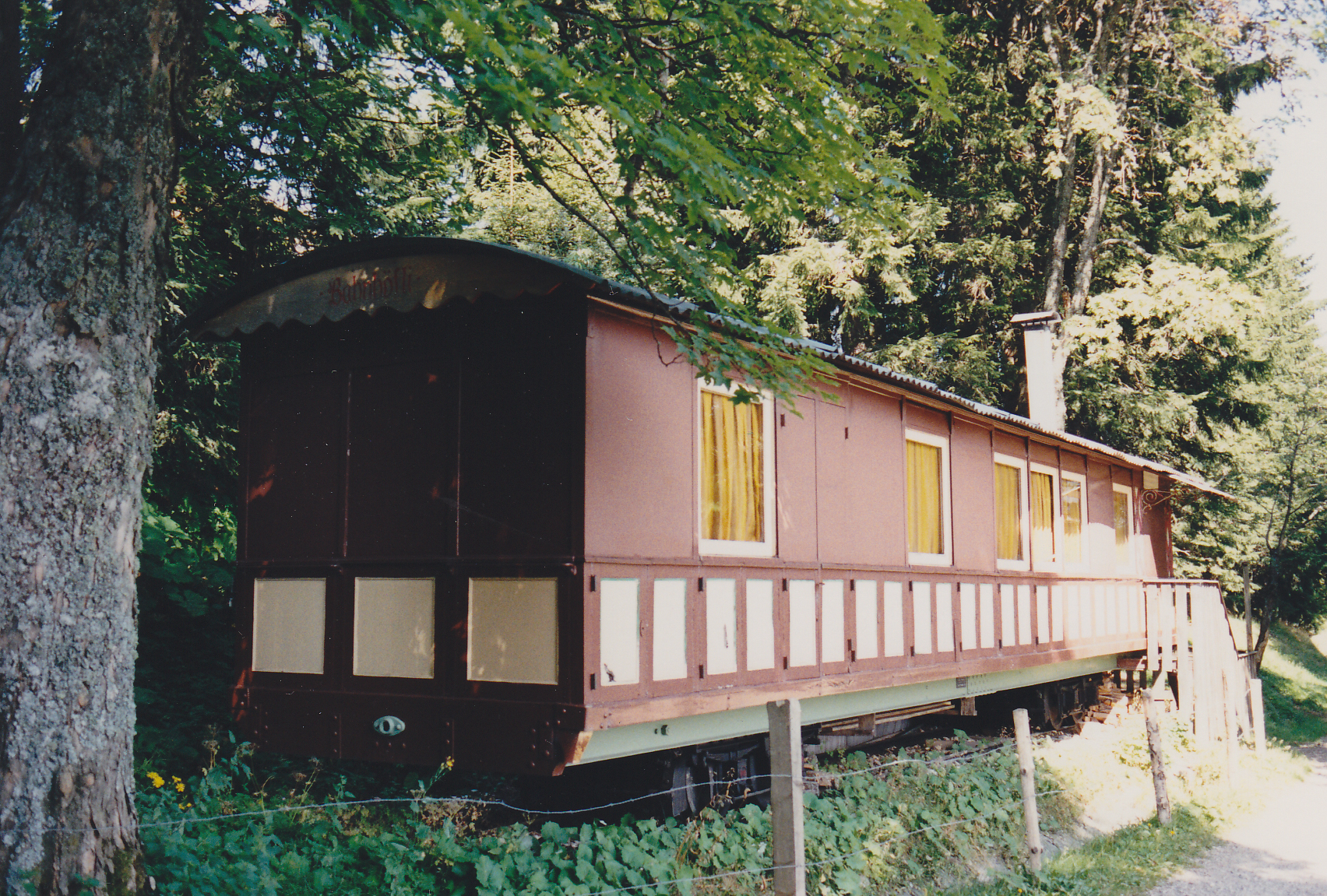
One of the passenger cars now used as a holiday home, seen in 1990

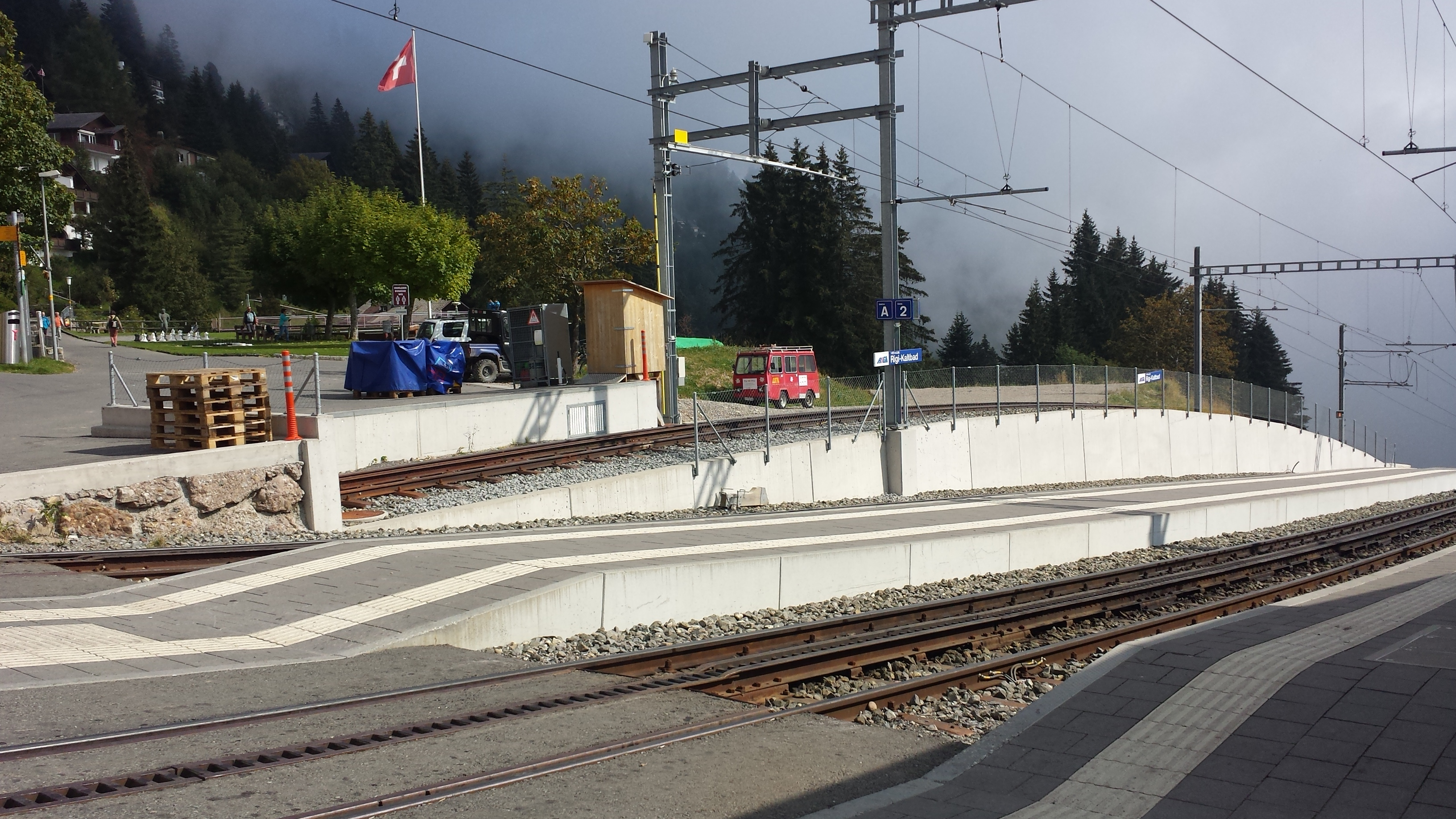
Kaltbad on the Vitznau–Rigi line, with the Rigi–Scheidegg terminus marked by the footpath at right angles

== Bibliography ==
- Inäbnit, Florian (1999). Rigi - Scheidegg - Bahn (in German). Prellbock Druck & Verlag. ISBN 9783907579138.
