= Walter Jones (polo player) =

British polo player

Olympic medal record

Men's Polo
Silver medal – second place	1908 London	Team competition

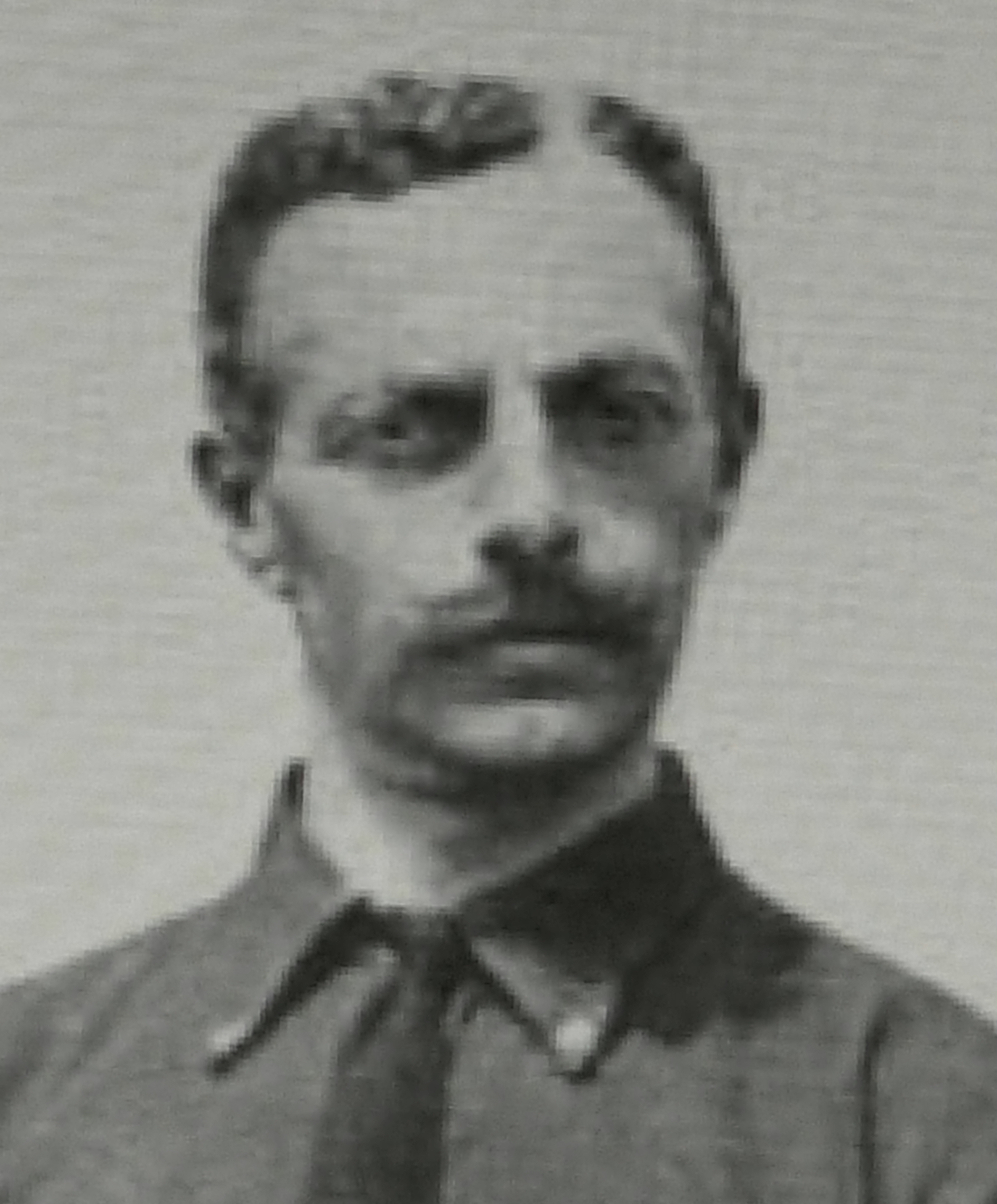
Walter Jones, c. 1908

Walter John Henry Jones (June 4, 1866 – April 14, 1932), was an English polo player.

== Biography ==
He was born at The Elms, Warrington, the son of William Charles Jones and Lucretia Elizabeth Jones. His father was the owner of Jones Brothers Cotton Mills in Leigh, and extremely wealthy. Jones was a fine sportsman, was educated at Harrow School and Jesus College, Cambridge, and played polo, primarily for the "Rugby" team, but also his own Blakemere team. He represented Great Britain in polo at the 1908 Summer Olympics, playing for the Hurlingham team, winning the silver medal. He lived at Blakemere Hall, Northwich, Cheshire (until 1923), and Hurlingham Lodge in Fulham, London. He married Maud, the widow of George Littelton Dewhurst (another Lancashire cotton magnate) of Beechwood, Lymm, Cheshire and Aberuchill Castle, Scotland. Walter's stepson, Lieutenant George Littleton Dewhurst of the Rifle Brigade, was killed in action on the first day of the First Battle of the Somme on 1 July 1916 aged 24.

Jones, a cotton-broker, was an important collector of first editions and watercolours and enjoyed big-game hunting, fishing and polo. He purchased J. M. W. Turner's The Blue Rigi from Agnew's in 1912, who had purchased it at the sale of the collection of John Edward Taylor at Christie's for 2,700 guineas, but although he was interested in The Red Rigi (purchased for 2,100 guineas) he hesitated. It was sold to R.A. Tatton before being auctioned, yet again at Christie's, in 1928, when it was bought by Agnew's and sold to Jones. Along with other drawings by British artists, the collection passed to Jones' widow and was sold after her death at Christie's on 3 July 1942. Though The Blue Rigi still fetched the highest price in the sale, the wartime date explains the relatively low prices, The Blue Rigi fetching 1500 guineas, and The Red Rigi 1100 guineas. The seventeen other Turners in the sale, in addition to the two Rigi paintings, ranged in date from The West Entrance of Peterborough Cathedral of 1795 to a late Venetian watercolour of circa 1841 and included two of the 1817 Rhine series of watercolours painted for Walter Fawkes, probably Turner's greatest patron, and other British, German, Swiss and Italian subjects.

He died leaving a net estate of £327,406.
