= Bailiwick of Weggis =

Former bailiwick of Lucerne, Switzerland

Bailiwick of Weggis Landvogtei Weggis
- Bailiwick of Lucerne
- 1380–1798
- Territory of the bailiwick (Weggis and Vitznau)
- History
  - Established: 1380
  - Disestablished: 1798

The Bailiwick of Weggis (German: Landvogtei Weggis) was a late medieval bailiwick and, until 1798, an office (Amt) of the canton of Lucerne. It comprised Weggis and Vitznau and became the first bailiwick of Lucerne in 1380, when the lords of Hertenstein sold the advocacy to the city. Weggis long disputed Lucerne's sovereignty, citing its participation in the Confederate alliances of 1332 and 1359, and declared itself a subject territory only in 1535 and 1588.

== History ==
The Weggis affair of 1380 in the chronicle of Diebold Schilling the Younger, 1513

The bailiwick arose from the advocacy (Vogtei) over the Kelnhof (manorial estate) of Weggis belonging to Pfäfers Abbey; from 1161 the advocacy was held as an imperial fief. Around 1300 the bailiwick comprised the parish of Weggis-Vitznau (without Greppen) as a blood-court district. Around 1306 the Habsburgs held the advocacy over the abbey's estates, without the low court, and probably after 1315 they pledged it to the lords of Ramstein. In 1342 the Ramsteins granted it as a fief, together with the blood jurisdiction, to Niklaus von Hertenstein. In 1368–1370 the people of Weggis leased the advocacy taxes and dues. In 1380 the Hertensteins sold the advocacy to Lucerne, which at the same time acquired the Ramsteins' rights as overlords.

Around 1306 Weggis was still part of the office of Neu-Habsburg; in 1380 it became the first bailiwick of Lucerne. The first bailiff (Vogt) is mentioned in 1392. Weggis, however, held to its previous practice of the advocacy and repeatedly tried to refuse to swear the oath before the council in Lucerne (the Weggis affair, Weggiserhandel, of 1380). At the same time it disputed Lucerne's claim to territorial sovereignty, citing its participation in the Confederate alliances of 1332 and 1359; in the latter it was explicitly mentioned as an ally. Weggis, Vitznau and Gersau sought the status of independent Confederate cantons (Orte). They relied on Schwyz, to which they were tied through outburghers (Ausburger) and military service.

In 1433 and 1472, through Confederate arbitration rulings, Lucerne enforced its territorial sovereignty against the federal rights claimed by Weggis. Weggis was nevertheless able to maintain legal ambiguities and privileges for a long time, and it declared itself a subject territory only in 1535 and 1588. Its customary law (Amtsrecht) was codified in 1588 and 1612. As a small bailiwick, Weggis received a bailiff (Landvogt) from the Grand Council. In 1653, after supporting the authorities in the Peasants' War, the bailiwick received a banner and privileges.

== Bibliography ==
- P. A. von Segesser, Rechtsgeschichte von Stadt und Kanton Luzern, 1, 1851, 353–407
- U. Thalmann, "Luzern – Schwyz", in Mitteilungen des Historischen Vereins des Kantons Schwyz, 83, 1991, 41–62

=== Sources ===
- Collection of Swiss Law Sources, LU II/1
