= Weggis =

Swiss municipality in the canton of Lucerne

- Municipality
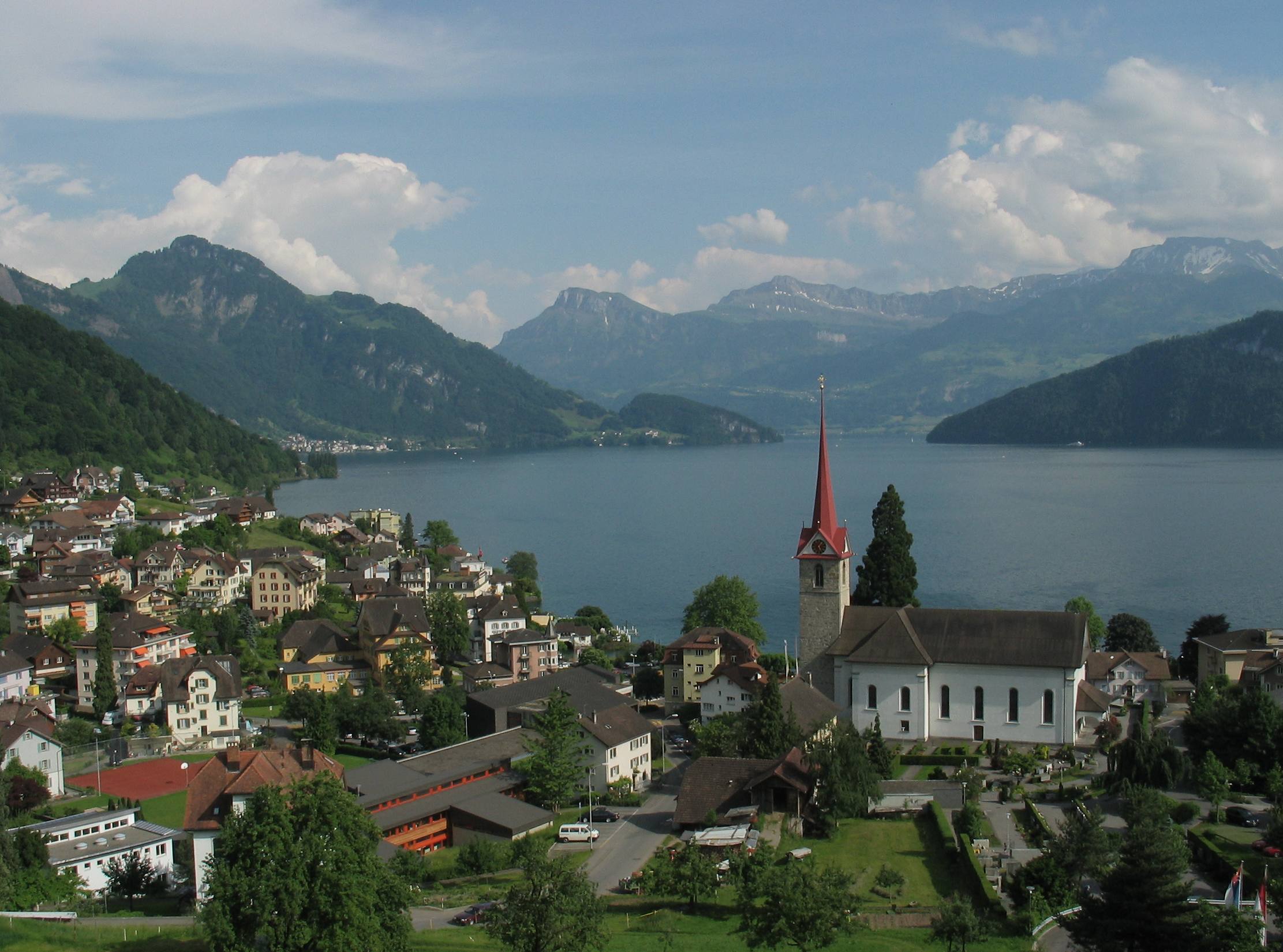

- Flag Coat of arms
- Location of Weggis
- Location within Switzerland Location within Canton of Lucerne
- Coordinates: 47°02′N 08°26′E
- Country: Switzerland
- Canton: Lucerne
- District: Lucerne

Area
  - Total: 25.29 km^{2} (9.76 sq mi)
- Elevation: 435 m (1,427 ft)

Population (December 2020)
  - Total: 4,440
  - Density: 176/km^{2} (455/sq mi)
- Time zone: UTC+01:00 (CET)
  - Summer (DST): UTC+02:00 (CEST)
- Postal code: 6353
- SFOS number: 1069
- ISO 3166 code: CH-LU
- Localities: Unterdorf, Oberdorf, Hinterdorf, Rain, Laugneri, Baumen, Dörfli, Tischital, Rigiblick, Hertenstein, Riedsort, Bannholz, Bodenberg, Sentiberg, Rigi Kaltbad
- Surrounded by: Arth (SZ), Ennetbürgen (NW), Greppen, Küssnacht (SZ), Meggen, Stansstad (NW), Vitznau
- Website: www.weggis.ch

Weggis is a municipality in the district of Lucerne in the canton of Lucerne in Switzerland.

It forms part of the northern shore of Lake Lucerne. The official language is German.

== History ==
In about 800 the monastery of Pfäfers acquired the court of Wattawis. The municipality had been settled even earlier, however, because the name "Weggis" comes from the Celtic and means "Place of the Ferrymen." The freedom-loving inhabitants were subordinates of the rule of the Habsburgs at some times. For both the monks and the Habsburgs, the Lords of Hertenstein exercised regency. By 1332 Weggis and Gersau were free republics and allies of the neighboring Old Swiss Confederacy. This was confirmed in a treaty between them in 1359. Thereafter, the Lords of Hertenstein sold their rights to Lucerne in 1380. They administered Weggis until 1798 as part of the Landvogtei of Weggis. The citizens of Weggis resisted the Lords of Lucerne through multiple rebellions before 1588. In the peasant war of 1653 they sided with the rule of Lucerne for once. The municipality belonged to the district of Lucerne from 1798 until 1803 and thereafter to the newly formed Lucerne Authority. In 1798 the community of Vitznau was separated from Weggis and formed into an independent municipality. In 2005, the project of combining the three municipalities around Mount Rigi in Canton Lucerne was delayed indefinitely.

== Geography ==
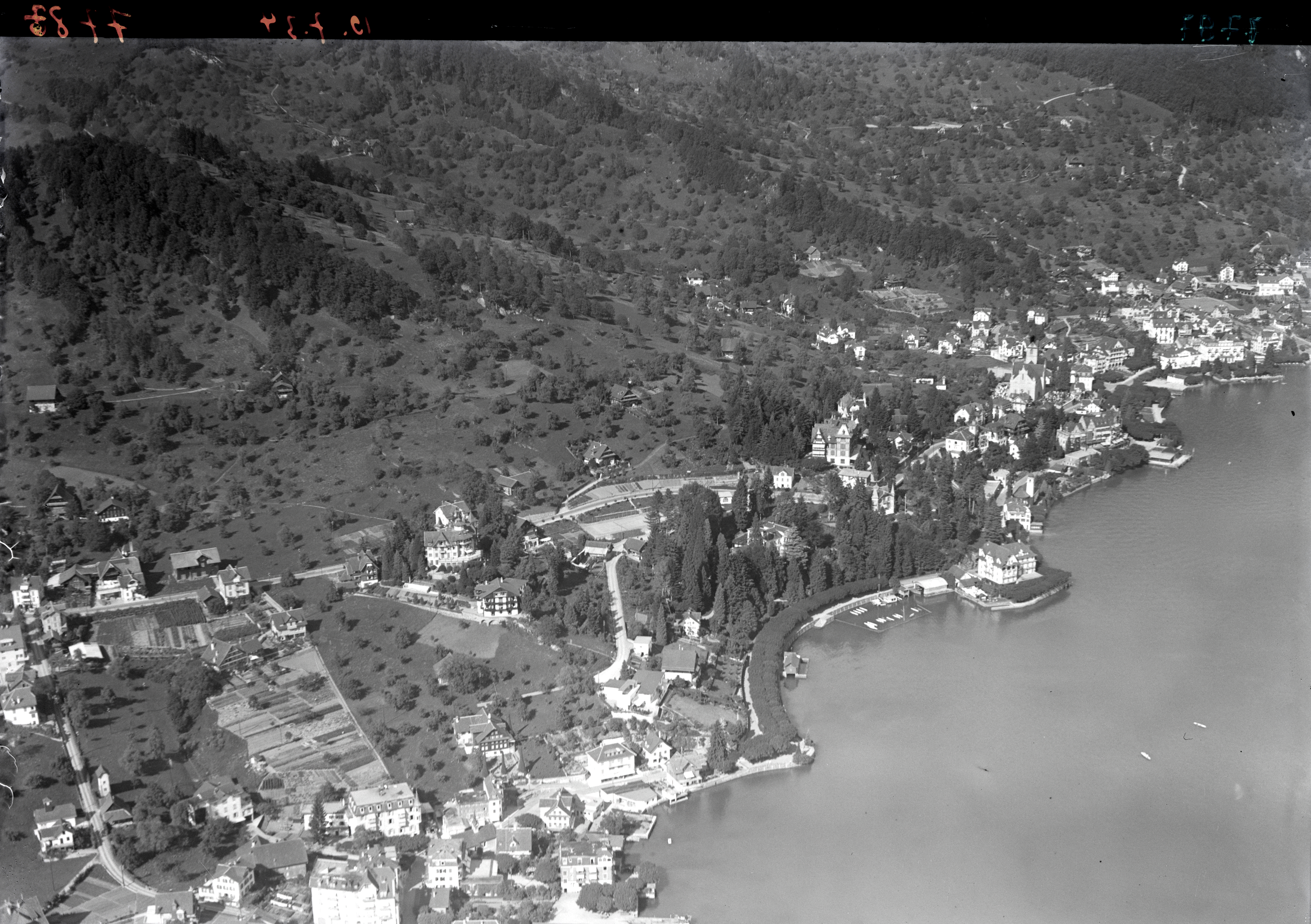
Aerial view from 200 m by Walter Mittelholzer (1934)

It lies on a projection into Lake Lucerne at the southwest base of Rigi, a mountain; such projections are named Weggiserbuchts for the one on which Weggis lies. The town has a famously mild climate and is well known for the numerous southern plants (chestnut trees, palms, grapes and orchids) that thrive there.

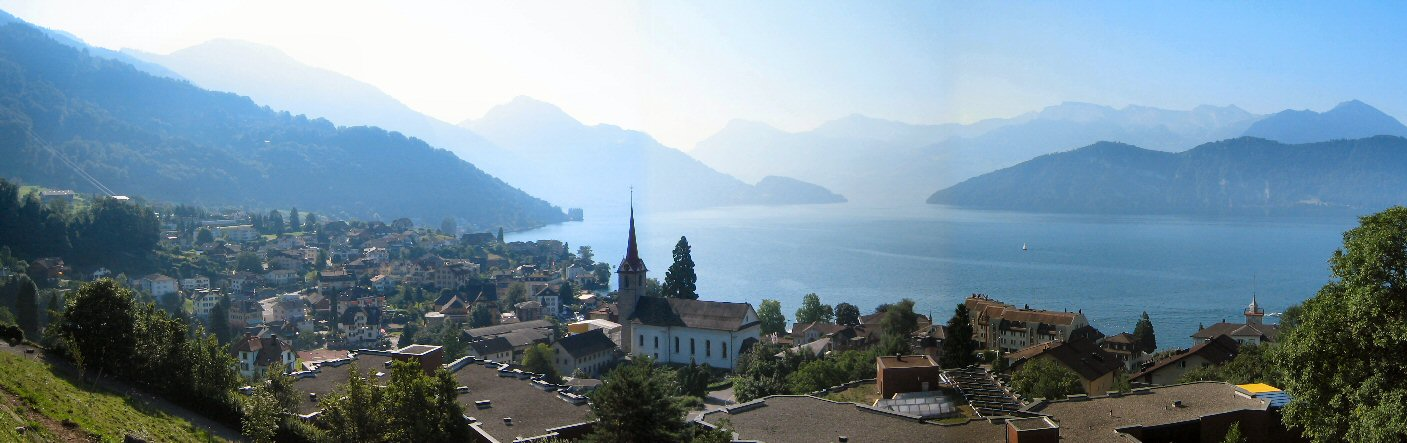
View of Weggis, Switzerland

The town of Weggis lies on a south-facing plain on the shore of Lake Lucerne. Formerly, the town consisted of only two communities, Unterdorf in the west and Oberdorf in the east. Because of development in the last decades, new communities have developed: Hinterdorf (east of Oberdorf), Rain and Laugneri (near Hinterdorf), Baumen and Dörfli (near Unterdorf), as well as Tischital and Rigiblick on the slope above Oberdorf. The community of Hertenstein (2.3 km (1.4 mi) south-west of the town, on the lake shore) lies in the extreme south-west corner of the municipality, on a peninsula. On the municipal border with Vitznau, 1.9 km (1.2 mi) south-east of the town, another quasi-community has developed. From the lake shore at elevation 436 m (1,430 ft) to an elevation of 794 m (2,605 ft), several hamlets have grown together. They are Riedsort (on the lake shore), Bannholz (elev. 667 m (2,188 ft)), Bodenberg (elev. 642 m (2,106 ft)), and Sentiberg (elev. 794 m (2,605 ft)). High up the slope, accessible by cog railway and aerial tramway, lies the community of Rigi Kaltbad (2.8 km (1.7 mi) north-east of the town, elev. c. 1,450 m (4,760 ft)). Many other neighborhoods and single farmsteads belong to the municipality.

With the exception of the Herrenwald, north of Hertenstein, the western and central portions of the municipality are unforested. The slopes of Mount Rigi to the east of Hinterdorf look completely different, however. This part of the municipality is heavily forested. Large areas of forest include the Kirchenwald on the slope north-east of Hinterdorf, through which the Kienbach river flows on its way to Lake Lucerne, and the Seeboden area, on the eastern border of the municipality.

The municipal border runs north for 1000 meters of elevation gain from west Unterwilen (in Vitznau) on Lake Lucerne up to Rigi-First (in Canton Schwyz). And from there it runs northwesterly to Rotstock (elev. 1659 m). Then it turns to the west and runs south of Greppen back to Lake Lucerne.

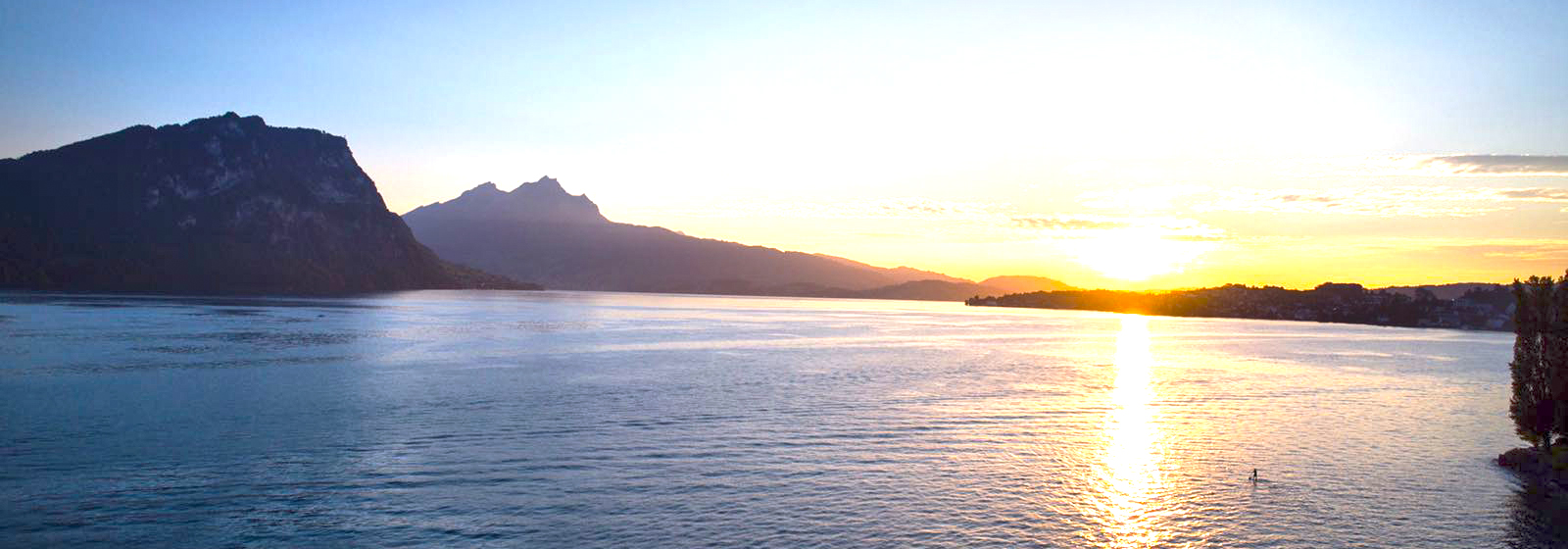
Mount Pilatus from Weggis, Switzerland

Weggis has an area of 11.8 km^{2} (4.6 sq mi). Of this area, 46.1% is used for agricultural purposes, while 38.9% is forested. Of the rest of the land, 14% is settled (buildings or roads) and the remainder (1.1%) is non-productive (rivers, glaciers, or mountains). In the 1997 land survey, 38.75% of the total land area was forested. Of the agricultural land, 39.34% is used for farming or pastures, while 6.68% is used for orchards or vine crops. Of the settled areas, 9.14% is covered with buildings, 0.08% is industrial, 0.17% is classed as special developments, 0.85% is parks or greenbelts, and 3.81% is transportation infrastructure. Of the unproductive areas, 0.08% is unproductive standing water (ponds or lakes), and 1.1% is other unproductive land.

== Neighboring municipalities ==
Weggis borders Küssnacht and Greppen to the north, Arth in Canton Schwyz to the northeast, Vitznau in the east and southeast, and Lake Lucerne.

== Population ==
=== Population growth ===
From 1850 till 1880, with the exception of 1870, the number of inhabitants remained constant. From 1880 until 1970 was a period of population growth (of 94.5%), interrupted by two periods of stagnation, 1930–1941 and 1950–1960. In these ninety years the population nearly doubled. The 1970s brought a setback (of -6%). Since then the population has grown very much because of the municipality's good location and the local hotel management school's high enrollment. One unique population characteristic is the fact that over 200 Chinese (mostly from the Shanghai region) who are studying at the hotel management school live in Weggis. Weggis has a population (as of 31 December 2020) of 4,440. As of 2007, 18.4% of the population was made up of foreign nationals. Over the last 10 years, the population has grown at a rate of 13%.

Population Growth
Year	Population
1850	1'279
1870	1'384
1880	1'294
1900	1'522
1950	2'247
1970	2'517
1980	2'367
1990	2'997
2000	3'616
2004	3'927

=== Language ===
The population uses a dialect of High Alemannic (or Swiss) German as their everyday language. The dialect of Weggis deviates greatly from that used in Lucerne, and is more similar to that used in Canton Schwyz.

- Example 1:
  - German: ich gehe
  - Lucerne: ech goh
  - Schwyz/Weggis: ich gah
- Example 2:
  - German: neu
  - Lucerne: nöi
  - Schwyz/Weggis: nüü

At the time of the last census (2000) 84.9% listed German as their primary language, 1.63% listed Portuguese and 1.41% listed English. However, the second most common language is Chinese, which, however, is listed only as an "East Asian Language" in the census.

=== Religious denominations ===
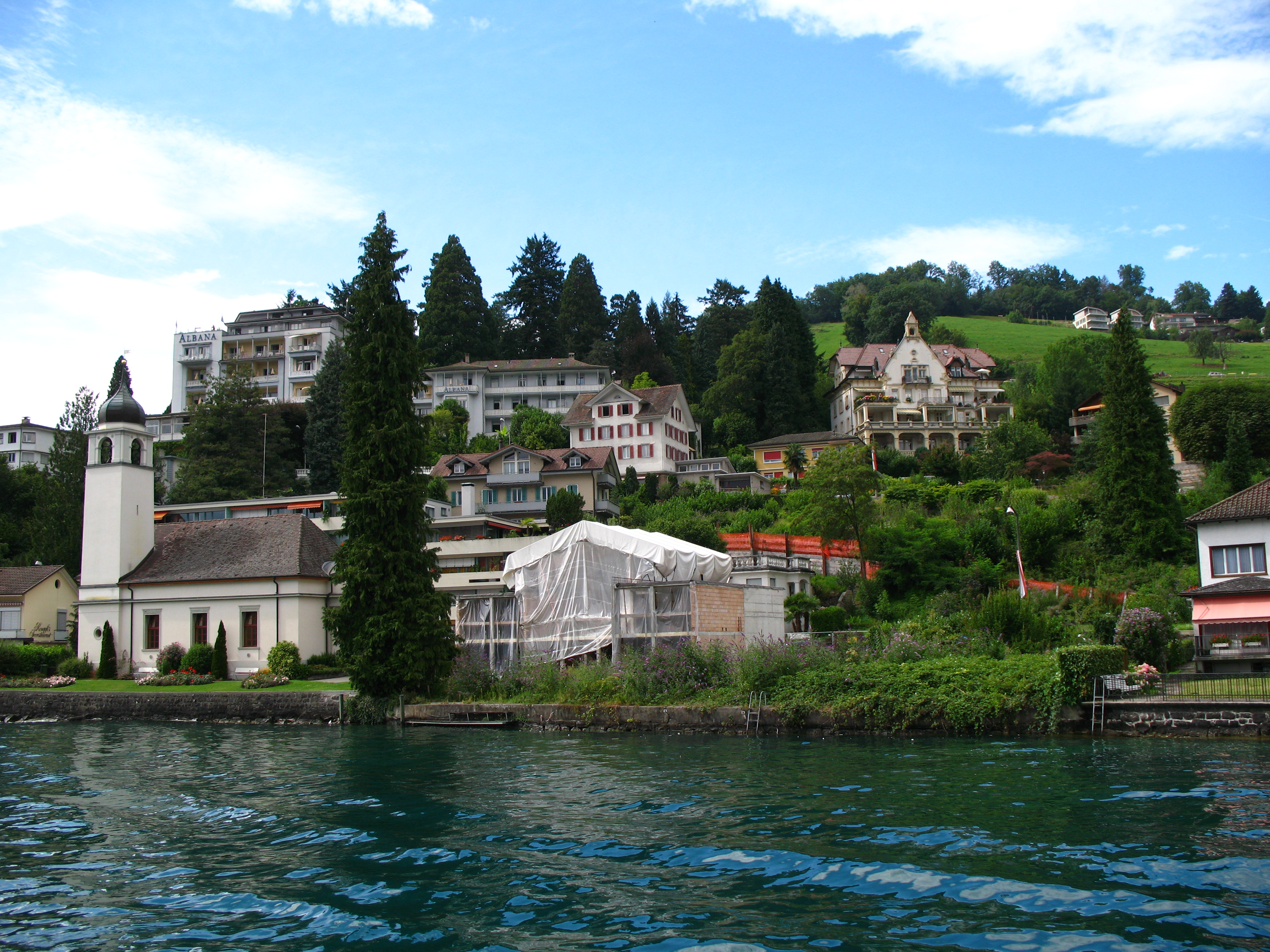
Weggis Church

Formerly, all citizens were members of the Roman Catholic Church. This has been changed by people leaving the church, and by immigration from other parts of Switzerland, and from foreign countries. Today (as of 2000) the religious composition of the population is as follows. 59.98% are Roman Catholic, 16.7% are Protestant, and 1.66% are Eastern Orthodox Christians; 10.01% are atheist, 1.99% are Muslim and 8.96% provided no information about their beliefs. Among the people who provided no data about their beliefs, some were probably Buddhist Chinese. The Chinese also make up the most important part of the atheist group. The Eastern Orthodox Christians and Muslims are almost entirely people from the former Yugoslavia (Serbia, Montenegro, North Macedonia, and Bosnia)

=== Origin-nationality ===
Of the 3927 inhabitants at the end of 2004, 3141 were Swiss and 786 (or 20%) were foreigners. At the time of the last Census 75.19% (or 80.31% including dual citizens) were Swiss citizens. The largest immigrant groups come from China, Germany, Serbia and Montenegro (mostly Albania), Portugal, Italy, Austria and United Kingdom.

== Demographics ==
In the 2007 election, the most popular party was the SVP which received 32.8% of the vote. The next three most popular parties were the CVP (24.9%), the FDP (23.9%), and the Green Party (8.2%).

The age distribution in Weggis is as follows: 730 people, or 17.9% of the population, are 0–19 years old. 927 people, or 22.7%, are 20–39 years old, and 1,530 people, or 37.5%, are 40–64 years old. The senior population distribution is 664 people or 16.3% are 65–79 years old; 195, or 4.8% are 80–89 years old; and 37 people, or 0.9% of the population, are 90+ years old.

In Weggis about 72.8% of the population (between age 25–64) have completed either non-mandatory upper secondary education or additional higher education (either university or a Fachhochschule).

As of 2000 there are 1,412 households, of which 458 households (or about 32.4%) contain only a single individual. 90, or about 6.4%, are large households, with at least five members. As of 2000 there were 774 inhabited buildings in the municipality, of which 599 were built only as housing, and 175 were mixed use buildings. There were 364 single-family homes, 96 double-family homes, and 139 multi-family homes in the municipality. Most homes were either two- (276) or three- (204) story structures. There were only 36 single-story buildings and 83 four-or-more-story buildings.

Weggis has an unemployment rate of 1.9%. As of 2005, there were 153 people employed in the primary economic sector and about 42 businesses involved in this sector. 281 people are employed in the secondary sector and there are 46 businesses in this sector. 1209 people are employed in the tertiary sector, with 179 businesses in this sector. As of 2000 51.4% of the population of the municipality was employed in some capacity. At the same time, females made up 45.8% of the workforce.

== Tourism ==
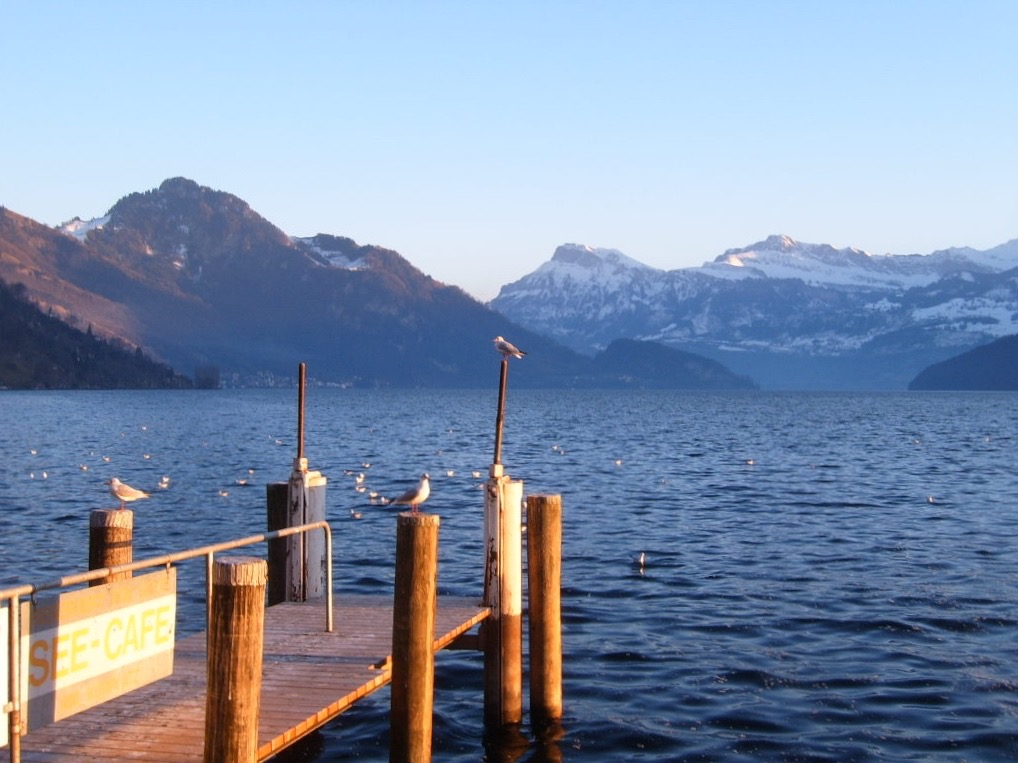
Lake Lucerne from Weggis

After Lucerne, Weggis is the second biggest tourist destination in Canton Lucerne. With the aerial tramway, one can arrive at Rigi-Kaltbad, in the neighborhood of which is located Viewpoint Känzeli. From Rigi-Kaltbad, one can continue his climb up the mountain on the cog railway (Vitznau-Rigi-Bahn). Weggis is also designated the "Riviera of Central Switzerland" because of its "tropical" climate.

== Transportation ==
Weggis is easily reached by public transportation, although it is not on a train line. It is served by ships and buses belonging to the Lake Lucerne Navigation Company at the Weggis landing stage. The "Riviera" bus line Küssnacht (train station)- Weggis- Gersau- Brunnen (train station)- Schwyz connects the municipalities on the route with the surrounding area. The train station in Küssnacht is on the line from Lucerne to Goldau, and the train station in Brunnen is on the "Gotthard" line (Basel-Chiasso). The ships to and from Lucerne operate mostly hourly.

Weggis is on the road connecting between Küssnacht and Brunnen. The nearest Autobahn exit, for the A4, is 10 km (6.2 mi) away, in Küssnacht.

== Personalities ==
- French pianist Hélène Grimaud resides in Weggis (as of 2020).
- In 1932, Russian composer Sergei Rachmaninoff purchased land on the lake at Hertenstein, near Weggis to construct a house, naming it Villa Senar based on his and his wife's names. He lived there until the outbreak of war in 1939. In the comfort of his own villa, Rachmaninoff completed his Rhapsody on a Theme of Paganini in 1934 and Symphony No. 3 in 1936.
