= The Rigi =

Paintings by J. M. W. Turner

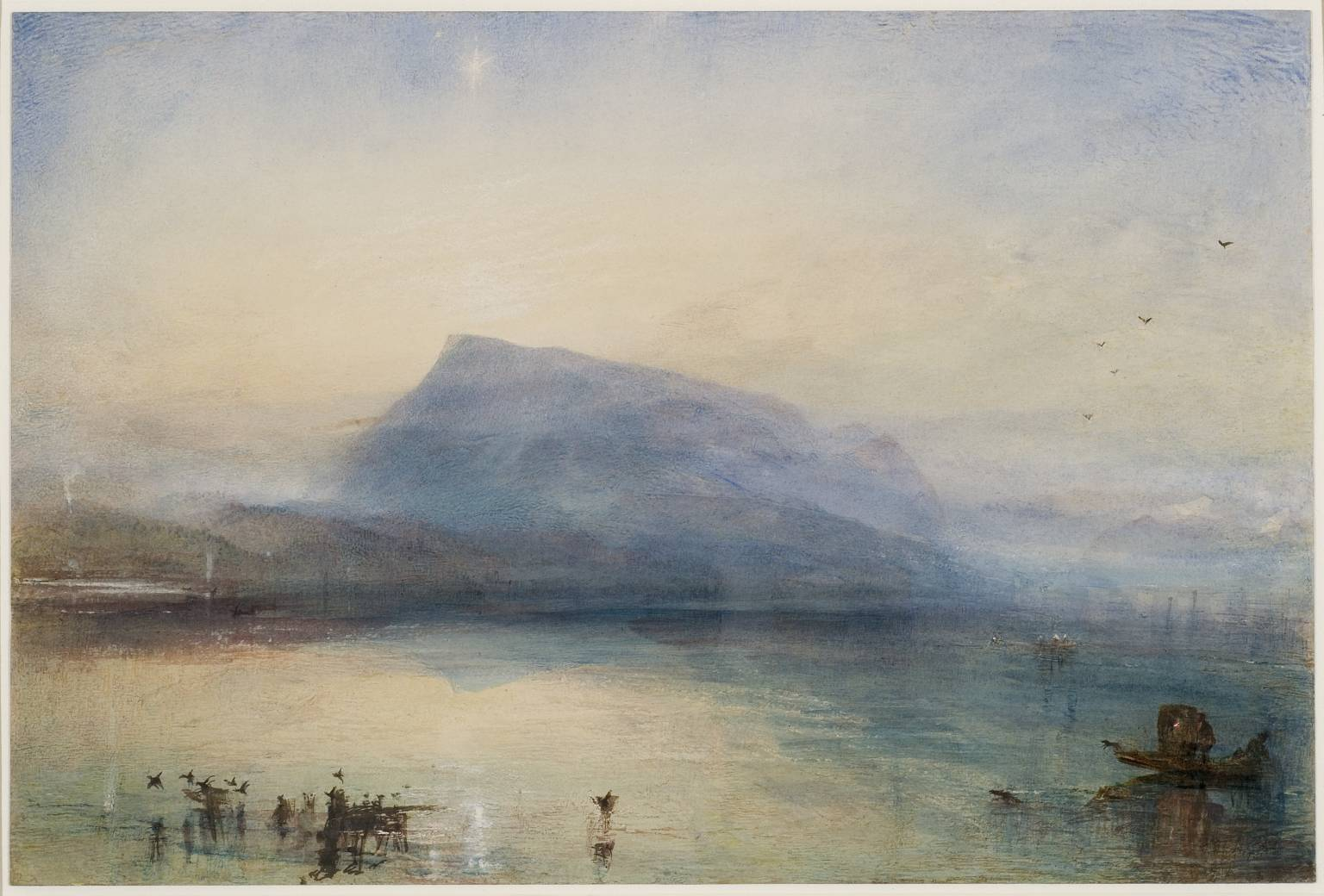
The Blue Rigi, 29.7 × 45 centimetres (11.7 × 17.7 in), 1842; Tate Gallery

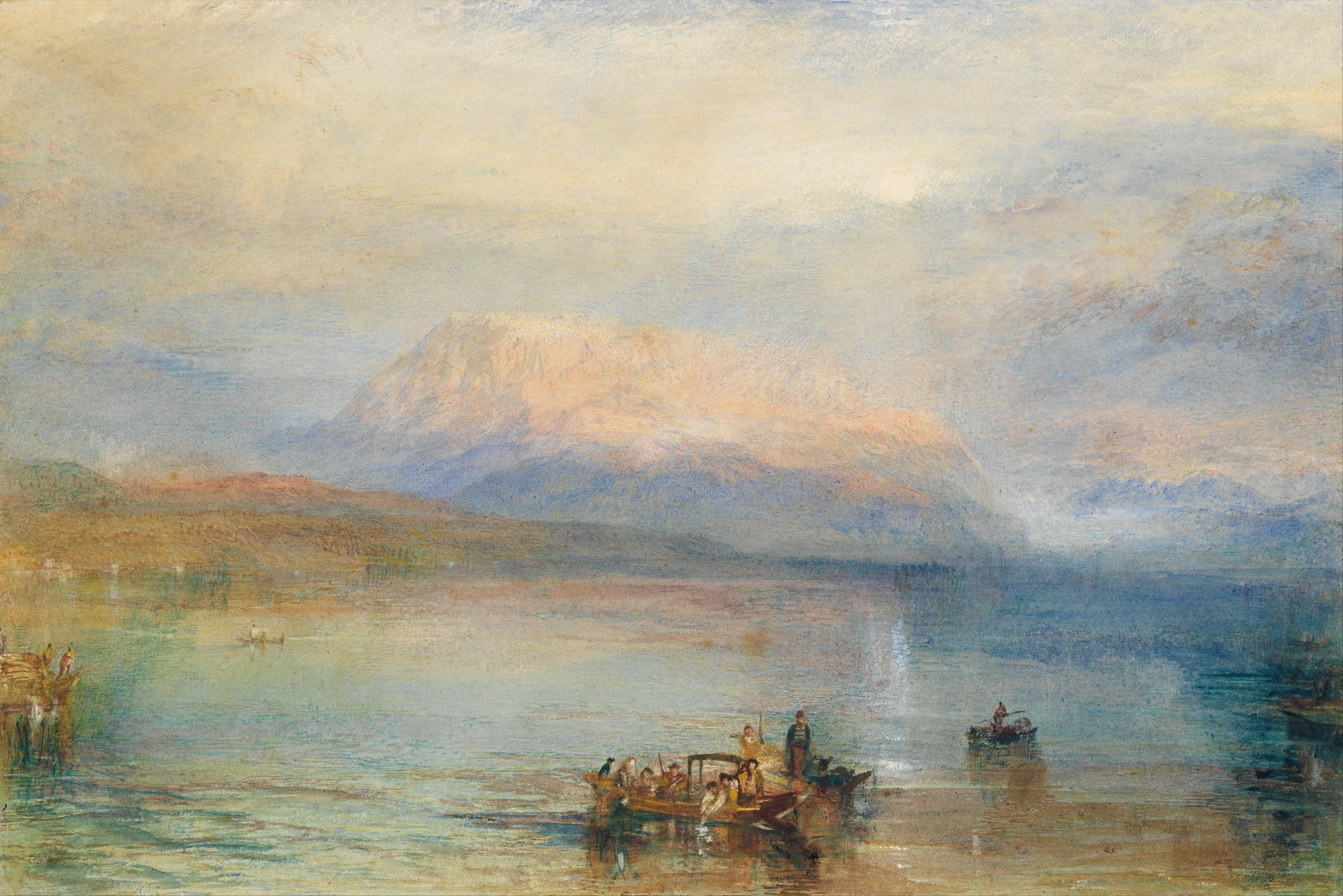
The Red Rigi, 30.5 × 45.8 centimetres (12.0 × 18.0 in), 1842; National Gallery of Victoria.

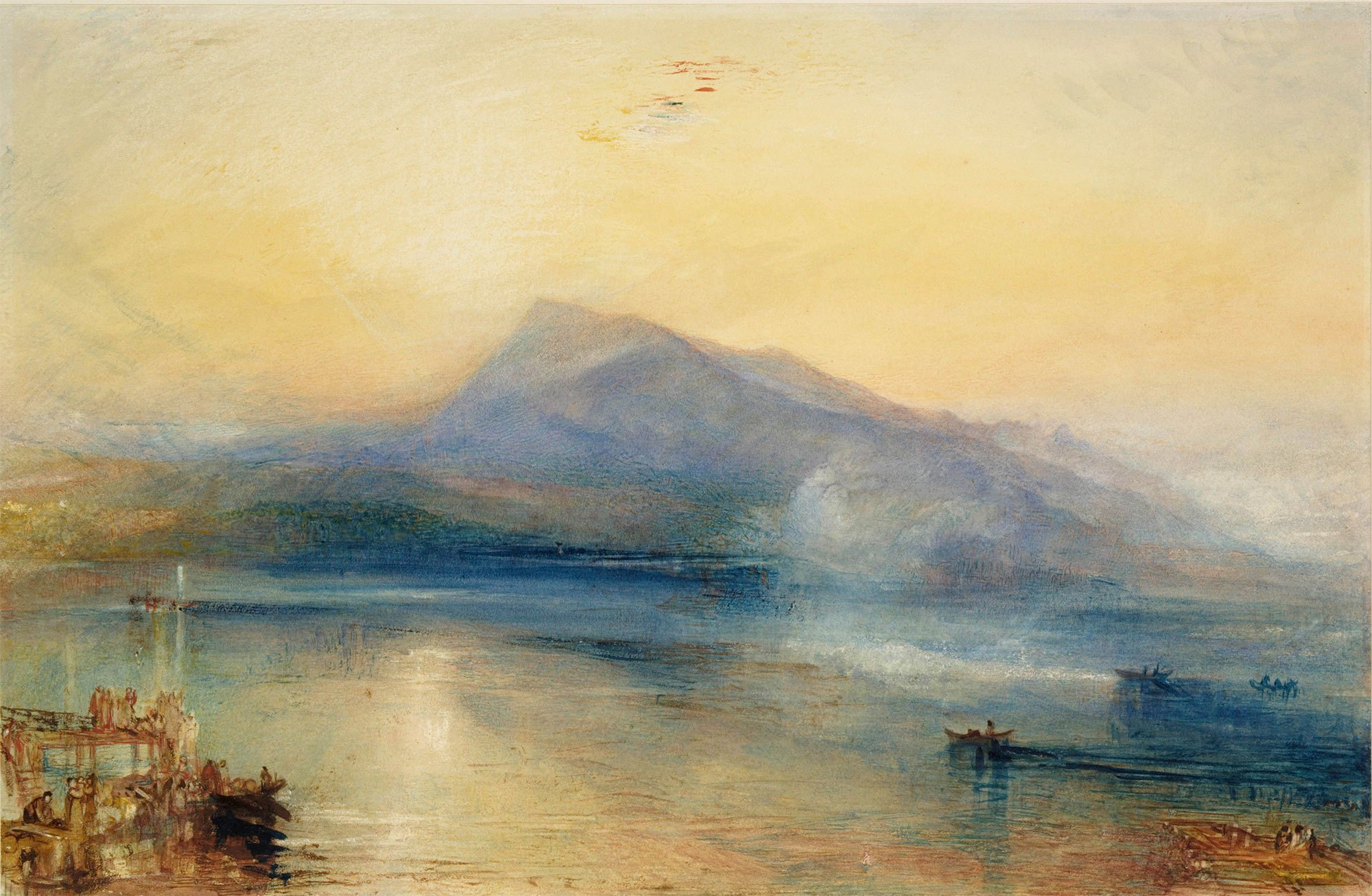
The Dark Rigi: The Lake of Lucerne (showing the Rigi at sunrise), 1842; Private Collection

In 1842, British artist J. M. W. Turner painted three watercolours of the Rigi, a mountain in the Alps in Central Switzerland, which he had visited the previous summer. Widely regarded as some of his finest works, the watercolours capture the transitory effects of light and atmospheric conditions at the Rigi. According to John Ruskin, "Turner had never made any drawings [watercolours] like these before, and never made any like them again ... He is not showing his hand in these, but his heart."

The Blue Rigi, Sunrise, better known simply as The Blue Rigi, was acquired in 2007 by the Tate Gallery in Britain for £4.95m, matching the price achieved at auction in 2006, then the largest sum paid by the Tate for a single artwork. The Red Rigi is held by Australia's National Gallery of Victoria and shows the mountain blushed by the evening sun. The Dark Rigi is held in a private collection. Many preparatory sketches are held by the Tate as part of the Turner Bequest.

Between January and March 2007, the three Rigi watercolours were united for the first time in an exhibition held at the Tate Gallery.

== Background ==
Turner painted several variations of the Rigi in 1842, following a visit to Switzerland the previous summer. Completed examples include The Red Rigi, blushed by the evening sun, originally sold to H.A.J. Munro of Novar and now held by the National Gallery of Victoria in Melbourne, Australia, and The Dark Rigi, an early morning view, in a private collection. Many preparatory sketches are held by the Tate as past of the Turner Bequest.

Victorian art critic John Ruskin may have been the first to describe the different members of Turner's Rigi series by their colours. The different colours and moods of Turner's Rigi series draws parallels that of Hokusai's prints of Mount Fuji, Cézanne's paintings of Mont Sainte-Victoire, and Monet's series of Rouen Cathedral.

Turner painted the watercolours as part of a commercial series of ten watercolours. He worked up 15 sample studies (sketches) to show potential patrons his intentions, with the hope of securing commissions for fully worked up watercolours to be sold for 80 guineas each. He also completed The Blue Rigi and The Red Rigi, and two others, as examples of how the finished paintings would look. Most were bought by Munro, including The Red Rigi, and he commissioned Turner to complete The Dark Rigi. Ruskin later bought The Red Rigi from Munro.

== Description ==
The Blue Rigi depicts the Rigi mountain in central Switzerland, viewed from the southwest across Lake Lucerne. The "Queen of Mountains" is blue in the early morning light, wreathed by veils of morning mist. The tonality is built up with layers of colour wash, with fine detail added through cross-hatching with a fine brush. Two “stars”, of which the brighter one often erroneously identified as Venus, glint in the yellow morning sky above, where paint has been scratched out with a fingernail to reveal the bright white ground. In the left foreground, drawn in with pen and brown ink, ducks can be seen rising from the lake, alarmed by a gunshot and chased by two dogs, to the right foreground.

== Provenance ==
Turner sold The Blue Rigi in 1842 through dealer Thomas Griffith to whaling mogul Elhanan Bicknell. After Bicknell's death, the painting was sold at Christie's in April 1863 for 296 guineas to the art dealer Agnew's, and resold a month later to John Edward Taylor (son of the founder of the Manchester Guardian). The Blue Rigi was engraved as a mezzotint by Sir Frank Short in 1910.

After Taylor's death, the painting was sold in July 1912 for 2,700 guineas, again auctioned at Christie's and acquired by Agnew's. Agnew's acquired about two thirds of the Taylor's Turners in the 12-day sale, including The Red Rigi for 2,100 guineas. The Blue Rigi was acquired by cotton broker Walter H. Jones and inherited by his widow, Maud. Jones later also acquired The Red Rigi from Agnew's, after it was sold to a different collector and then auctioned at Christie's again in 1928. After her death, The Blue Rigi was acquired for a third time by Agnew's at a Christie's auction, in July 1942, for 1,500 guineas, and sold to a private collector. The Red Rigi was sold at the same sale for 1,100 guineas. It was acquired by the National Gallery of Victoria, in Melbourne, Australia, in 1947.

In 2000-01, The Blue Rigi was illustrated as the frontispiece to the catalogue accompanying an exhibition of Turner's watercolours at the Royal Academy. The work was auctioned for a fourth time at Christie's on 5 June 2006, achieving a sale price of £5,832,000 including buyer's premium, against an estimate of £2m. The hammer price doubled the record for a British work on paper, previously set by Dante Gabriel Rossetti's Pandora at £2.6m in 2000. The work was temporarily denied an export licence and it was acquired by the Tate Gallery in 2007 at a matching price (after allowance for tax reliefs) of £4.95m - the largest sum paid by the Tate for a single artwork. The acquisition was funded by £1,950,000 from the National Heritage Memorial Fund, £2m from the Tate's own resources, £500,000 from the Art Fund, and £582,000 raised from the public by the "Save the Blue Rigi" appeal.

The Dark Rigi was also sold to a private collector in February 2006, for £2.7m. A proposed sale to the National Gallery of Art in Washington, DC, was abandoned when the British government imposed a temporary export ban.

The three Rigi paintings - Blue, Red and Dark - were exhibited together at the Tate Gallery in 2007, and again in 2014.

Martin Hardie wrote of Turner: "In the Rigi drawings he is the insuperable master of technique. He used every possible manipulation of brush, colour and paper, every device, every weapon in his armoury, sponging, rubbing, washing, stippling, hatching, touching and retouching, to express the vibration and radiation of light. Light was his theme."

== In popular culture ==
The Blue Rigi appears in several episodes of Better Call Saul, where it is seen hanging on the wall at the law offices of Schweikart and Coakley.

== See also ==
- List of paintings by J. M. W. Turner
