= Rigi Kaltbad =

Resort in the Swiss Alps

Coordinates: 47°02′39″N 8°28′00″E

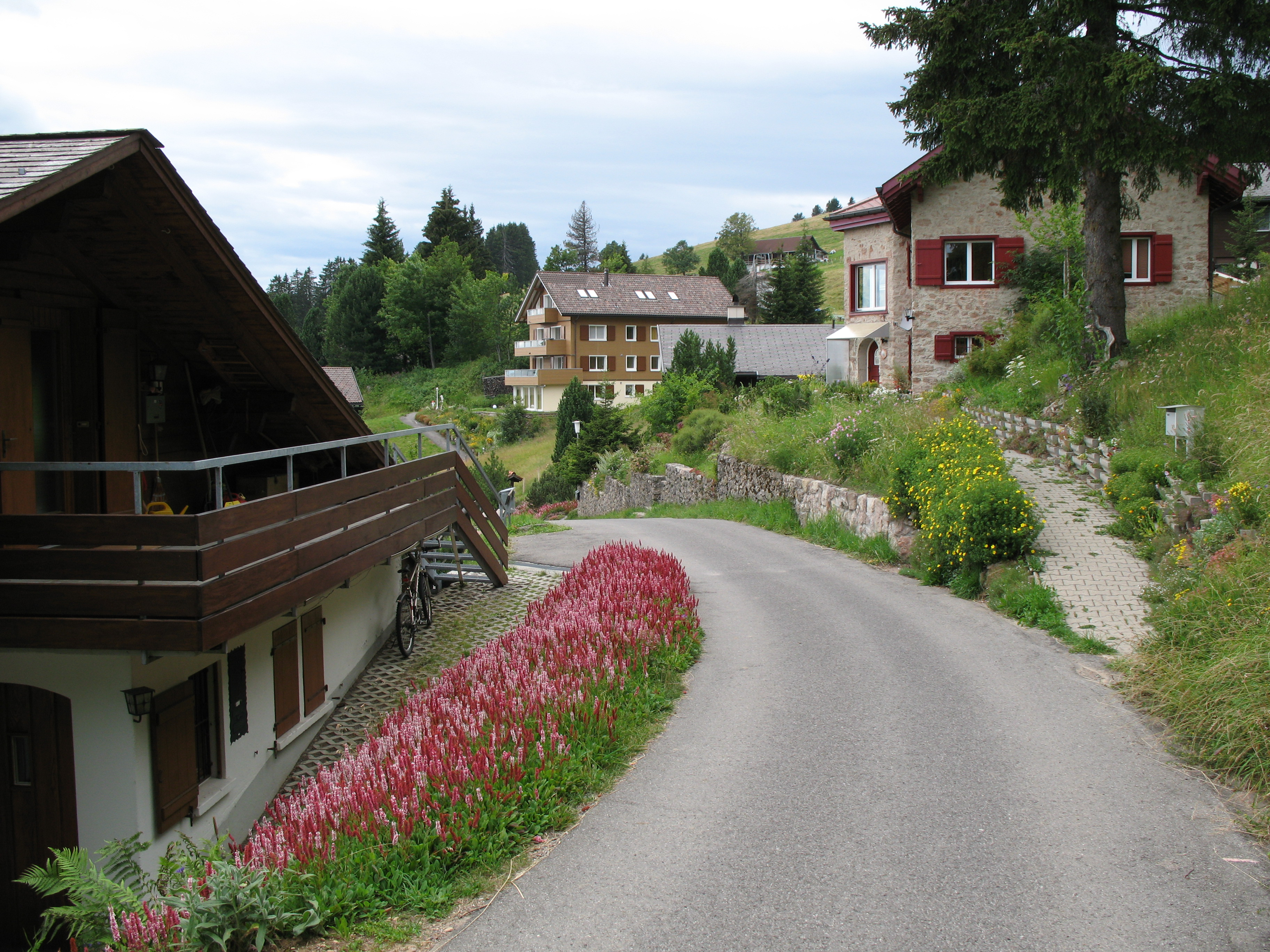
View of Rigi Kaltbad

Rigi Kaltbad is a resort in the Swiss Alps, located in the canton of Lucerne. The resort sits on a sunny terrace at an elevation of 1,433 metres (4,701 ft), overlooking Lake Lucerne above Weggis in Central Switzerland. The locality is part of the municipality of Weggis.

Rigi Kaltbad is located on the flanks of the Rigi and is connected to Vitznau by the Rigi Railways. It is also connected to Weggis by a cable car.

Rigi Kaltbad was also the terminus of the Rigi–Scheidegg railway, a contour-following panoramic rail line that connected it to the Scheidegg summit between 1875 and 1931. Today the line's trackbed, which is 6.7 kilometres (4 mi) in length and includes a tunnel and several bridges, is a rail trail that serves in summer as a panoramic footpath, and in winter for cross country skiing.
