= Rigi =

Mountain in Switzerland

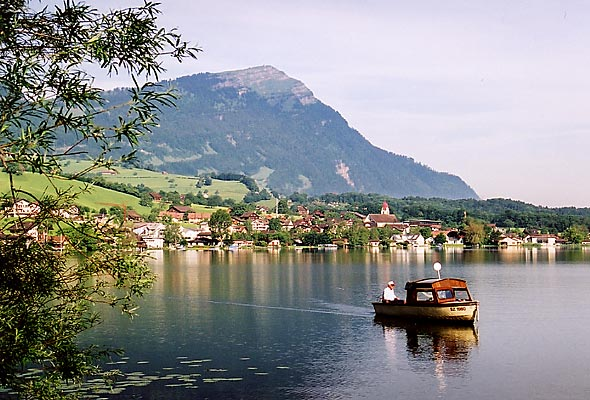
- Rigi behind Lake Lauerz

Highest point
- Peak: Rigi Kulm
- Elevation: 1,797 m (5,896 ft)
- Prominence: 1,288 m (4,226 ft)
- Isolation: 13.1 km (8.1 mi)
- Coordinates: 47°03′24″N 8°29′08″E

Geography
- Location within Switzerland Location within Canton of Schwyz
- Country: Switzerland
- Cantons: Schwyz; Lucerne
- Parent range: Schwyzer Alps
- Topo map: Swiss Federal Office of Topography swisstopo

Climbing
- Easiest route: Train and Cable-car

The Rigi (or Mount Rigi; also known as Queen of the Mountains) is a mountain massif of the Alps, located in Central Switzerland. The whole massif is almost entirely surrounded by the water of three different bodies of water: Lake Lucerne, Lake Zug and Lake Lauerz. The range is in the Schwyzer Alps, and is split between the cantons of Schwyz and Lucerne, although the main summit, named Rigi Kulm, at 1,797 meters above sea level, lies within the canton of Schwyz. The Rigi Kulm Hotel, established in 1816, is located on the summit.

The Rigi Kulm and other areas, such as the resort of Rigi Kaltbad, are served by Europe's oldest mountain railways, the Rigi Railways. The whole area offers many activities such as skiing or sledging in the winter, and hiking in the summer.

== Peaks ==
Name of peak	Height above sea	Canton
Rigi Kulm	1,797 m (5,896 ft)	SZ
Rotstock	1,658 m (5,440 ft)	LU/SZ border
Dosse	1,685 m (5,528 ft)	LU/SZ border
Scheidegg	1,659 m (5,443 ft)	SZ
Vitznauerstock (LU)/Gersauerstock (SZ)	1,452 m (4,764 ft)	LU/SZ border
Rigi Hochflue (Urmiberg)	1,699 m (5,574 ft)	SZ

== Etymology ==
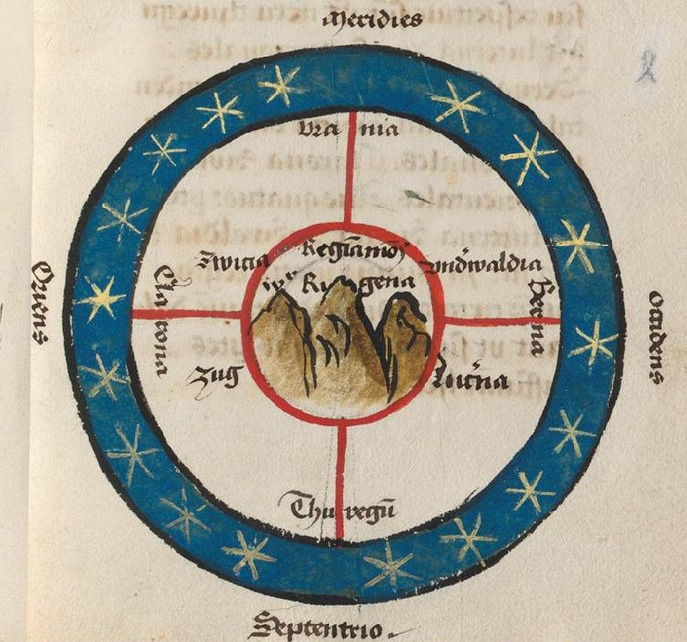
Depiction of Rigi as the center of the Swiss Confederacy (Albrecht von Bonstetten, 1479)

The name Rigi is from Swiss Old High German *rigî "horizontal stratification, strip, band", from OHG rîhan "gird; pleat, string", cf. OHG rîga "row, stripe, furrow", after the horizontal rock ledges and grass strips surrounding the mountain from west to east. The name is first recorded in 1350 as Riginun.

The name was interpreted as Regina montium "queen of mountains" by Albrecht von Bonstetten (1479), who however gives Rigena as alternative form.

Bonstetten's interpretation as Regina was influential in the 17th century, and was still repeated in 18th-century travelogues. Karl Zay (Goldau und seine Gegend, 1807) criticized this latinization, arguing for mons rigidus instead. Later in the 19th century, many authors repeated either rigidus or regina as the name's supposed origin. The two possibilities were also adduced as explanation of the name's grammatical gender alternating between masculine and feminine. Brandstetter (Die Rigi, 1914) finally discredited these interpretations and established the origin in Old High German rîga (whence modern German Reihe, Reigen; cognate with English row).

== Transport ==
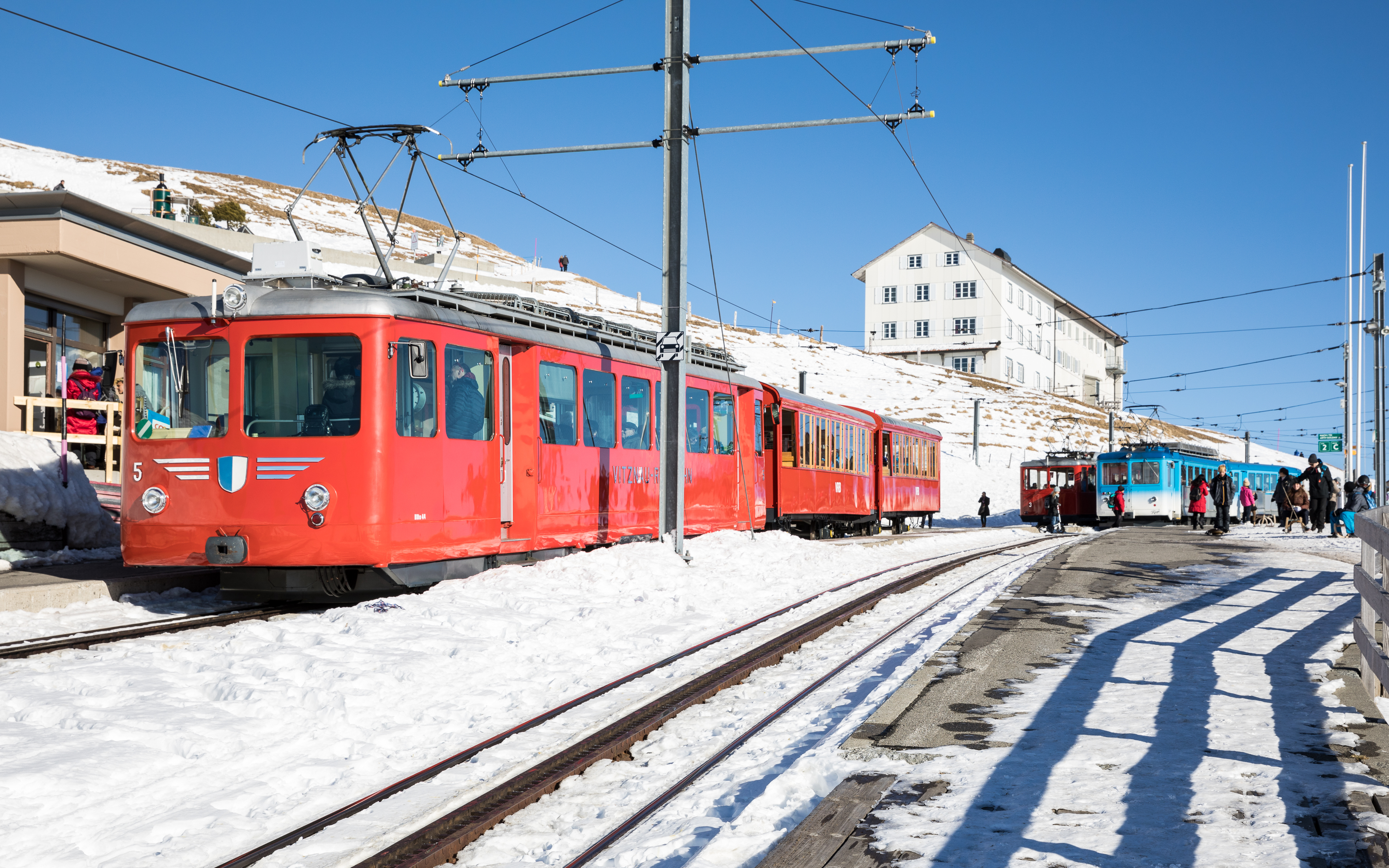
Rigi-Kulm station with trains of Vitznau-Rigi and Arth-Rigi railway

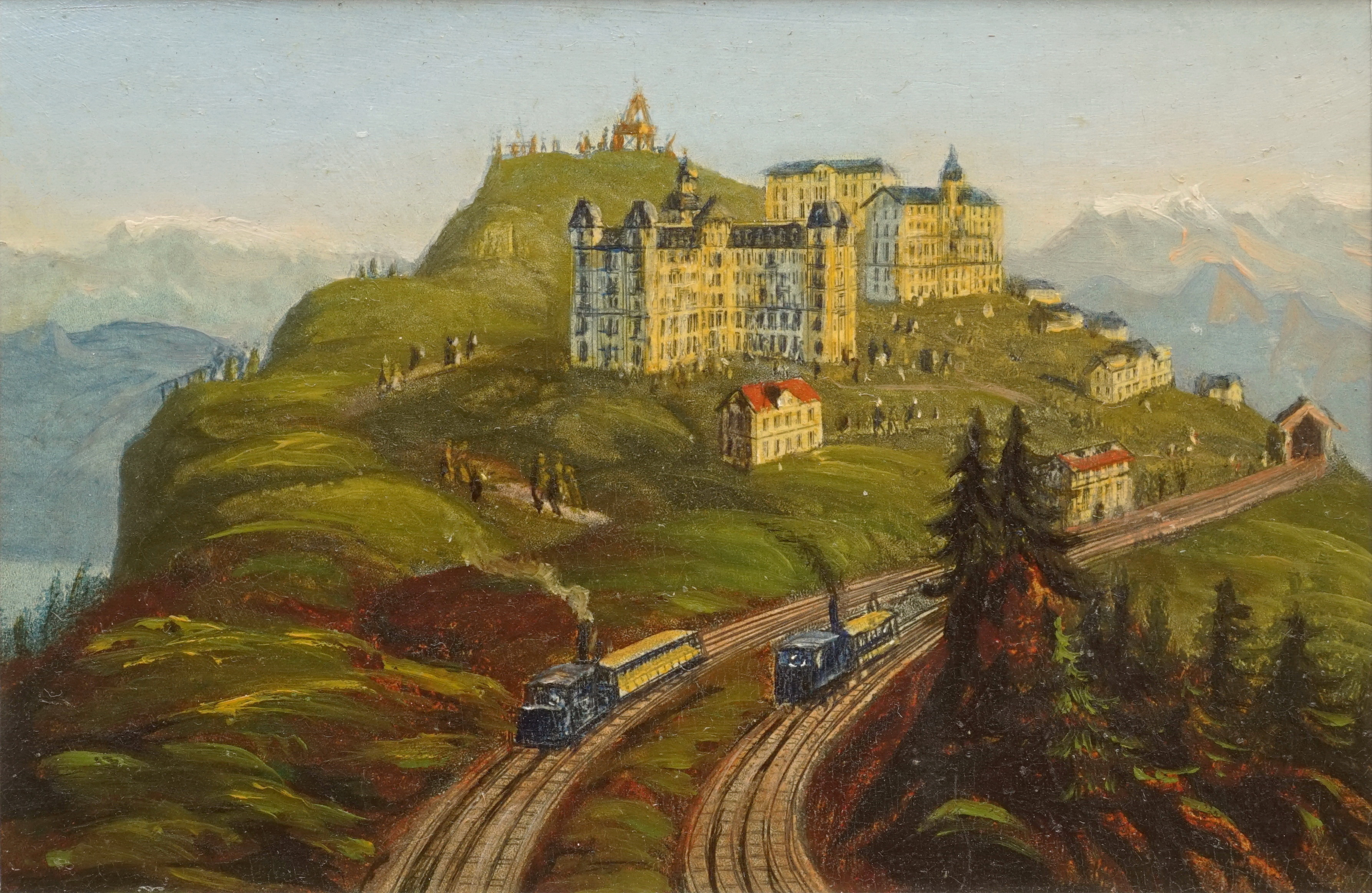
Rigi-Kulm with the two rack railways around 1880. Oil sketch by Heinrich Müller

There are multiple public transport options available to ascend Mount Rigi:

- By rack railway from Arth-Goldau and Vitznau, operated by the Rigi Bahnen. The Vitznau-Rigi-Bahn started operation on May 21, 1871 and was the first mountain railway in Europe. On June 4, 1875 the Arth-Rigi-Bahn was finished, allowing access from the other side of the mountain. They were electrified in 1937 and 1907 respectively, with the Arth-Rigi-Bahn becoming the first electrified standard gauge rack-railway in the world. Both lines go all the way to the summit, Rigi Kulm.
- By gondola lift from Weggis to Rigi-Kaltbad.
- By cable-car from the Kräbel station on the Arth-Rigi-Bahn line to Rigi-Scheidegg.

== Recreation ==
Mount Rigi offers an area for recreation and sports measuring approximately 90 square kilometres (35 sq mi) offering a variety of well-maintained walking trails or mountain hikes where visitors can have a panoramic view of 150 km (93 mi) from various marked points. There are also numerous public grilling stations located near the hiking trails.

Rigi is also a destination for people practising winter sports and other winter recreation activities.

== Rigi in culture ==
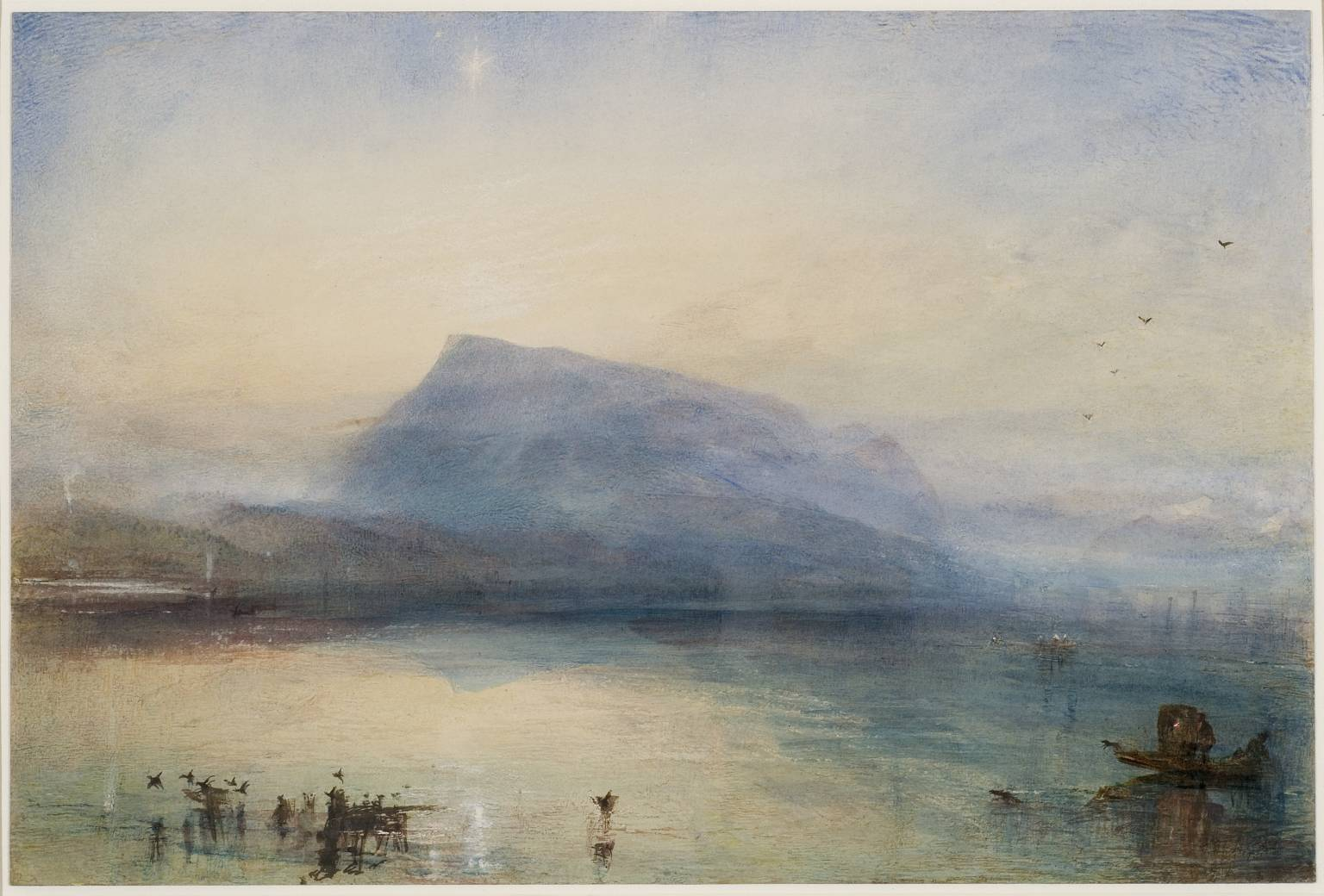
The Blue Rigi, Sunrise by J. M. W. Turner (watercolour on paper, 1842)

Rigi has been featured in many works of art, including both paintings and literary publications. Perhaps the most famous paintings of the Rigi were a series by J. M. W. Turner, including The Blue Rigi, Sunrise, several of which are in the collection of the Tate Britain art gallery in London.

Mark Twain also visited Rigi during his tour of Central Europe in the late 1870s, and wrote about his travels in chapter 28 of his A Tramp Abroad.

There is a Catskills resort called the Rigi Kulm in Abraham Cahan's novel The Rise of David Levinsky (1917).

The Rigi, a downhill road in Wellington, New Zealand, is named for the mountain and for many years was used as a main thoroughfare for coach riders.

On 9 July 1868, during a three-week tour through Switzerland, Gerard Manley Hopkins ascended Rigi-Kulm, the highest peak of the Rigi massif: "From Lucerne by steamer to Küssnacht, thence walk across to Immensee, thence by steamer over lake of Zug to Arth, whence up the Rigi."

== History ==
=== Early history ===
Mount Rigi was first mentioned in an official document from the old Schwyz district in 1353 as "Grat Riggen". During the Middle Ages, the mountain began attracting religious pilgrims after the establishment of chapels. The first chapel and hermitage was built at Rigi Kaltbad in 1585, with several hermits taking residence during summer months.

Pilgrimage tourism commenced in earnest in 1689 with the inauguration of the "Maria zum Schnee" pilgrimage chapel at Rigi Klösterli, which drew approximately 15,000 pilgrims annually. By 1730, pilgrim numbers had grown to around 25,000 per year.

=== Development of tourism ===
The transformation from religious pilgrimage site to secular tourist destination began in the 18th century. In 1775, Johann Wolfgang von Goethe visited Mount Rigi during his first trip to Switzerland, noting in his diary "The splendour of the world all around". The Romantic movement further popularized mountain tourism after Albrecht Haller published his poem "The Alps" in 1792.

The first inn for overnight stays opened at Rigi Kaltbad in 1756, followed by the first guesthouse at Rigi Kulm in 1816. Early wellness tourism also emerged around this time, with the natural spring at Kaltbad gaining a reputation for healing properties from 1540 onwards. By 1600, over 100 people annually made the trek to bathe in the spring water.

By 1818, English travel agencies were offering guided tours to Switzerland that included Mount Rigi as an option for "more adventurous and well-heeled tourists". The mountain's accessibility improved significantly in 1832 when Weggis became reachable by boat from Lucerne, serving as an interchange station for Rigi visitors.

=== The "Queen of the Mountains" era ===
Mount Rigi became Europe's premier mountain destination during the 19th century. By 1840, it attracted approximately 40,000 visitors each summer. The construction of the Vitznau–Rigi railway line in 1871, Europe's first mountain railway, increased visitor numbers to 70,000-80,000 annually.

Grand hotels were constructed across the mountain, including facilities at Kulm, Staffel, Klösterli, Rigi-First, Scheidegg and Kaltbad, providing approximately 2,000 hotel beds in total. Notable establishments included the fashionable Grand Hotel Schreiber at Rigi Kulm (opened 1875) with accommodation for 300 guests, and the high-class Rigi Kaltbad hotel (opened 1868) featuring 240 beds and various social rooms.

The mountain attracted distinguished visitors, including Queen Victoria of England, who rode on horseback from Küssnacht to Rigi Känzeli in 1868 and wrote "We are amused!" in her diary. In 1879, American author Mark Twain visited and wrote his humorous travel journal "A Trip to Mount Rigi".

=== The Rigikrankheit scandal ===
A major public health crisis emerged in the early 20th century known as the "Rigikrankheit" (Rigi sickness). Around 1900, visitors frequently suffered from severe diarrhea and vomiting, with hoteliers initially attributing the illness to mountain air or overindulgence. The problem became severe in 1909 when entire school classes fell ill, with the Zurich city doctor documenting 287 cases.

Authorities in Zurich and Winterthur banned school trips to the Rigi, and the Zurich Department of Health demanded written measures from Schwyz Cantonal Council to prevent future incidents. An investigation by district physician Carl Real revealed that contaminated drinking water, not mountain air, was the cause. The water supply systems were found to be in "scandalous" condition, with coli bacteria repeatedly detected.

The Kulm and Staffel hotels had particularly problematic water systems that mixed drinking water sources with wastewater from higher elevations, creating a cycle of contamination. In 1914, geology professor Albert Heim publicly warned Zurich residents: "If you go to the Rigi, don't drink one drop of the water!". This led to a high-profile defamation lawsuit by hotelier Joseph Fassbind against Heim, though the Zurich District Court ultimately rejected Fassbind's claim in 1917, finding the water source to be "highly questionable".

=== 20th century decline and recovery ===
The outbreak of World War I in 1914 marked the end of Rigi's golden age as international tourists disappeared almost overnight. Many grand hotels did not survive the war and were either demolished or burned down. The last known case of typhoid on the mountain occurred in 1932 at Kaltbad, leading to further improvements in the water supply system.

After World War II, Mount Rigi transitioned "from being the preserve of the holidaying elite to a day trip destination for mass tourism". The mountain's infrastructure was modernized with new transportation systems, including the Weggis-Rigi Kaltbad aerial cable car (opened 1968) and the integration of the various railway companies into RIGI BAHNEN AG in 1992.

Modern developments included the opening of the Mineral Bath & Spa designed by architect Mario Botta in 2012. In 2016, Mount Rigi Railways achieved record passenger numbers with over 305,000 passengers in a single quarter, marking the best results in its 145-year history.

== Geology ==
Geologically, the Rigi is not a part of the Alps, and belongs instead to the Swiss Plateau. It is mostly composed of molasse and other conglomerate, as opposed to the Bündner schist and flysch of the Alps.

== Gallery ==
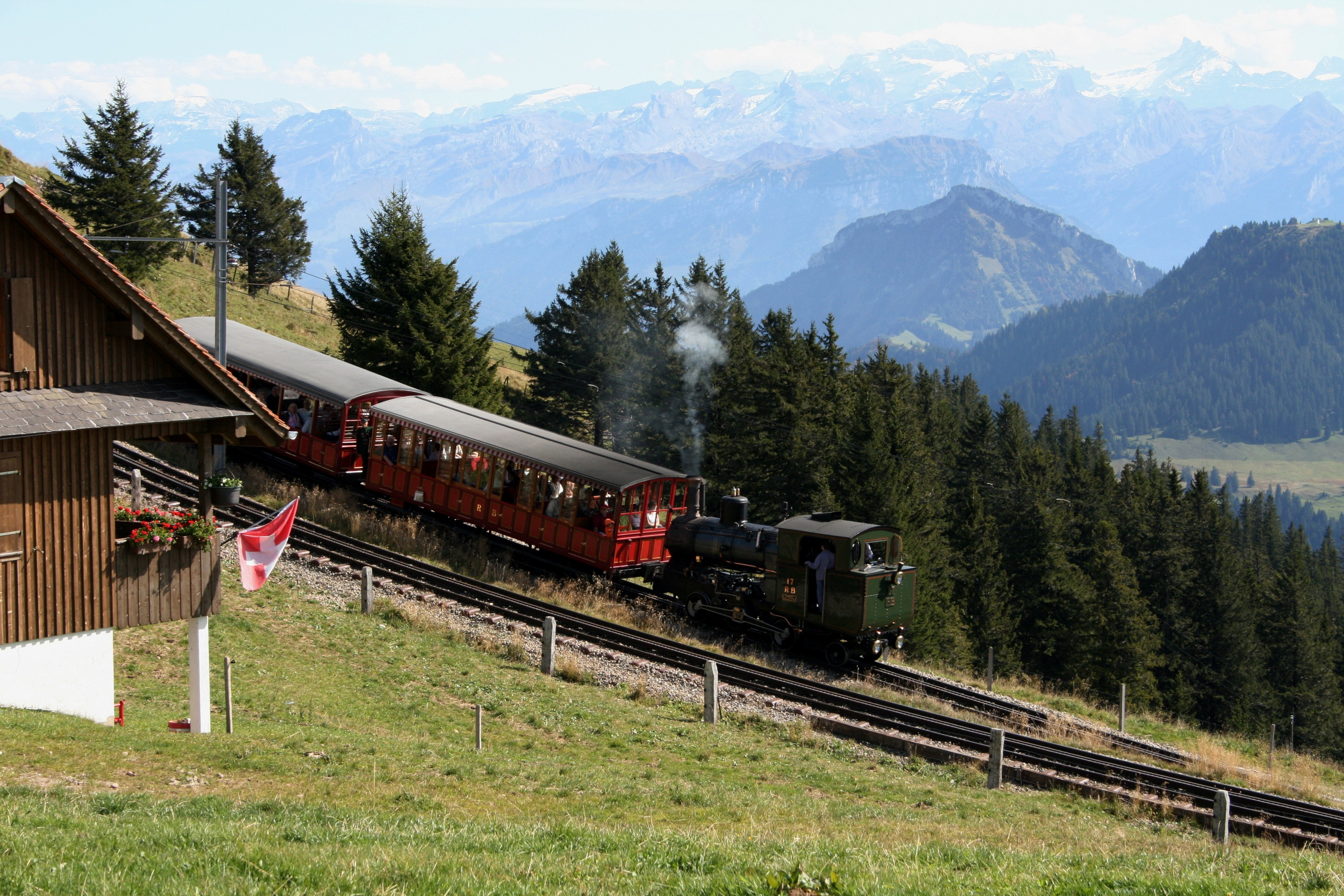
Steam train

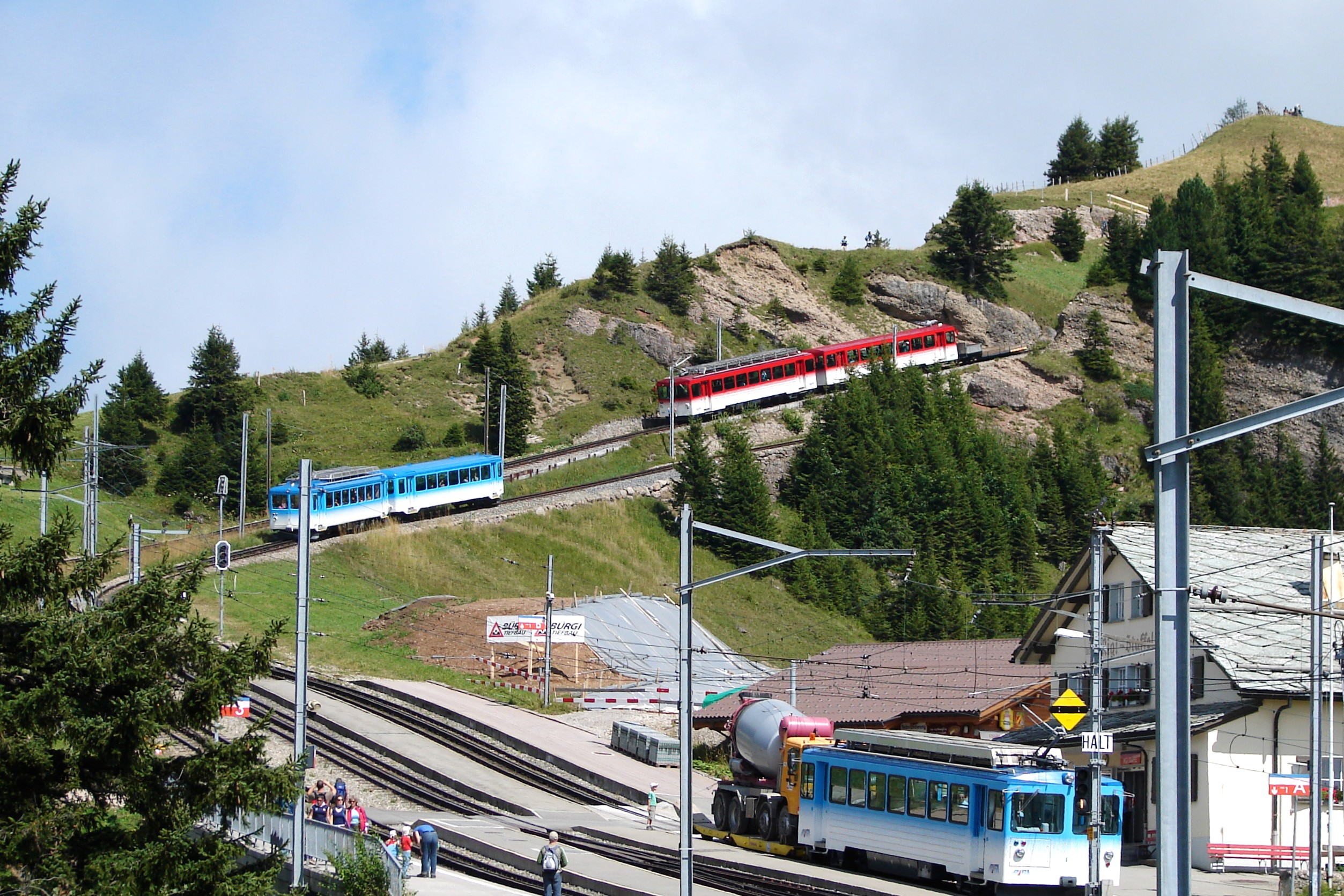
Station near the summit

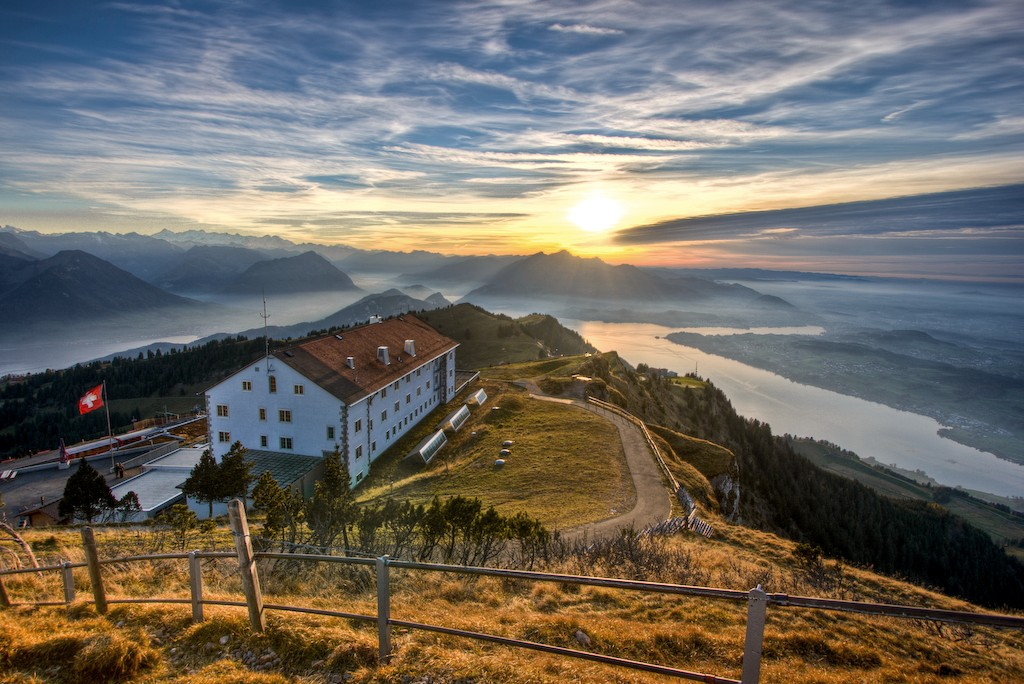
View from summit

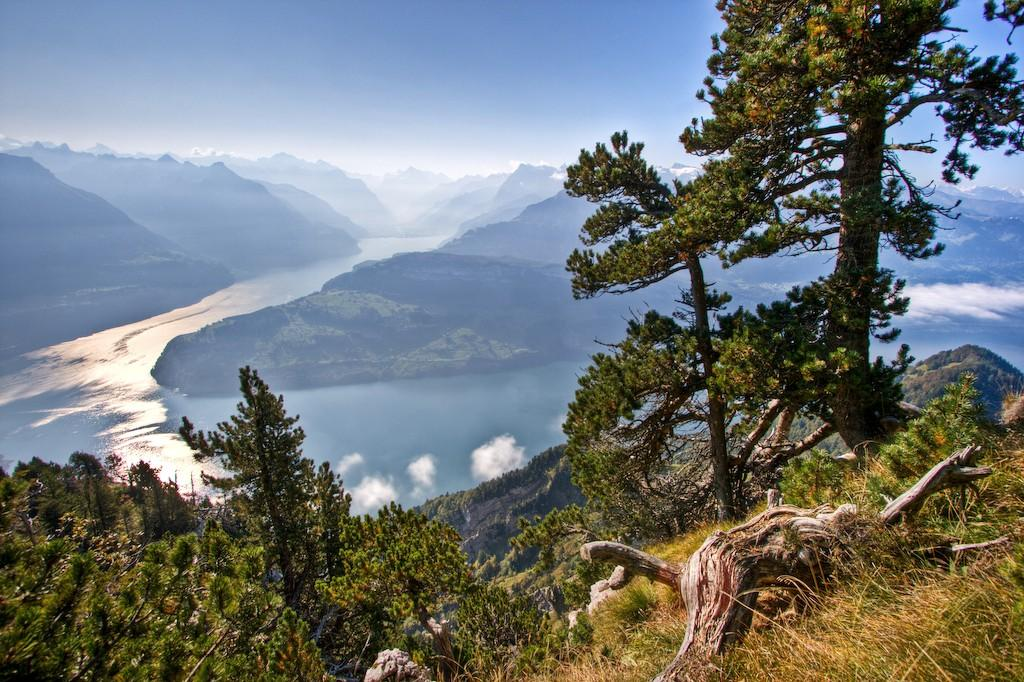
Lake Lucerne seen from Rigi

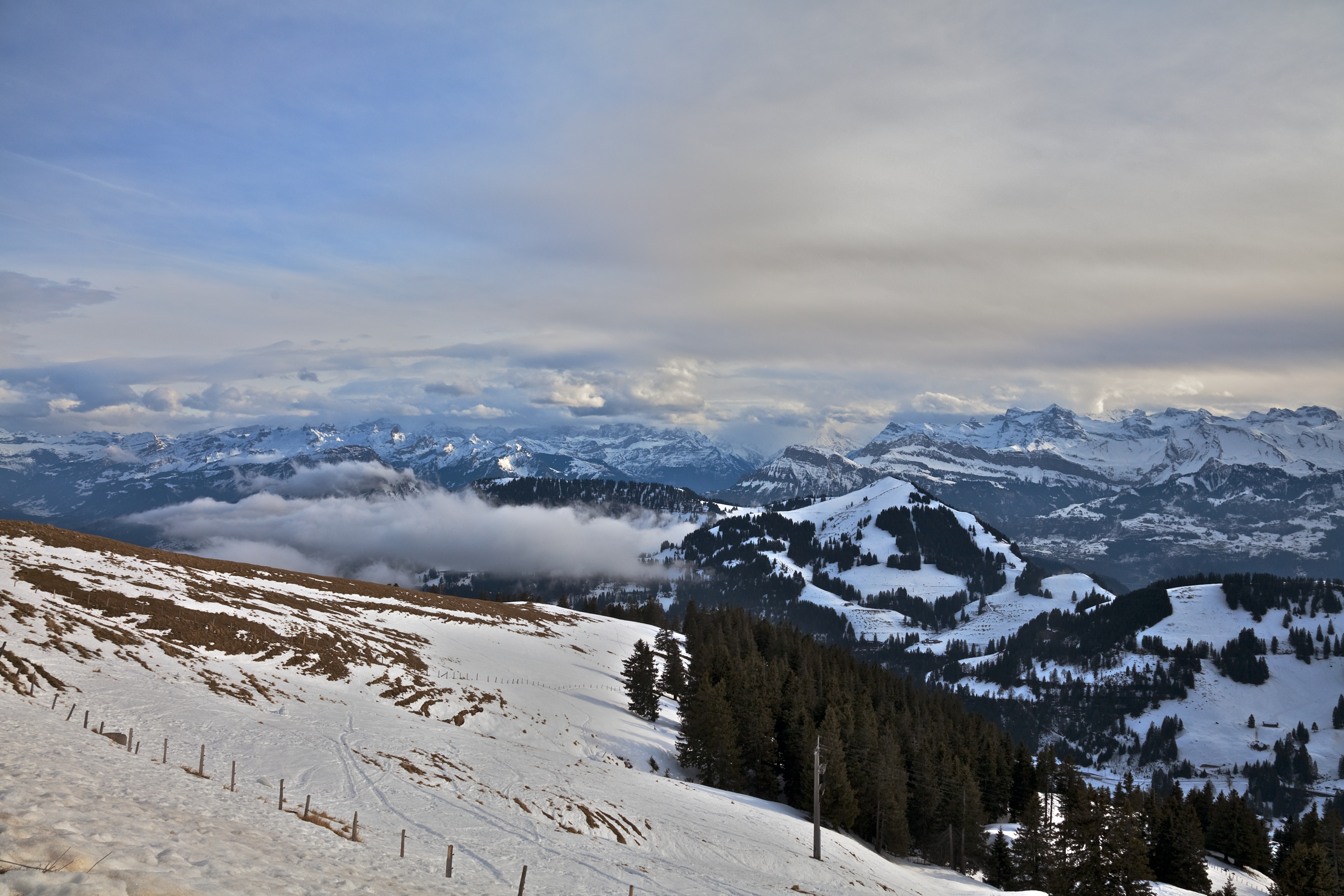
View of the alps of central Switzerland from Rigi Kulm.

== See also ==
- List of mountains of the canton of Schwyz
- List of mountains of Switzerland
- List of most isolated mountains of Switzerland
- List of mountains of Switzerland accessible by public transport
- Tourism in Switzerland
