= Rigi Hochflue =

Mountain in Switzerland

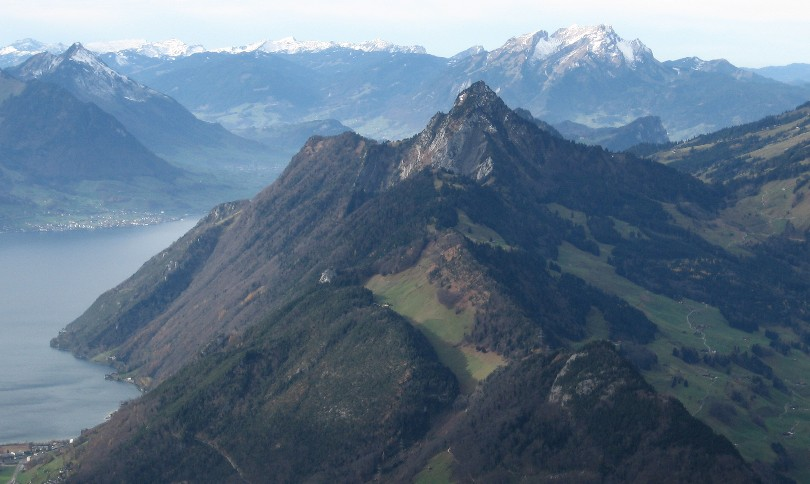
- The Rigi Hochflue and Lake Lucerne

Highest point
- Elevation: 1,699 m (5,574 ft)
- Prominence: 509 m (1,670 ft)
- Parent peak: Rigi Kulm
- Coordinates: 47°00′36″N 8°33′36″E

Naming
- Native name: Hoflue (Swiss Standard German)

Geography
- Location within Switzerland Location within Canton of Schwyz
- Country: Switzerland
- Canton: Schwyz
- Parent range: Schwyzer Alps
- Topo map: Swiss Federal Office of Topography swisstopo

The Rigi Hochflue is a mountain summit west of the mountain range Urmiberg, in itself part of the Rigi massif, overlooking the Gersauerbecken of Lake Lucerne in Central Switzerland on its mountainside to the south, and Lake Lauerz on its north side. It has an elevation of 1,699 metres (5,574 ft) above sea level and is located in the canton of Schwyz.

== See also ==
- List of mountains of the canton of Schwyz
