= Dosse (Rigi) =

Mountain in Switzerland

- Dossen (Germanized)
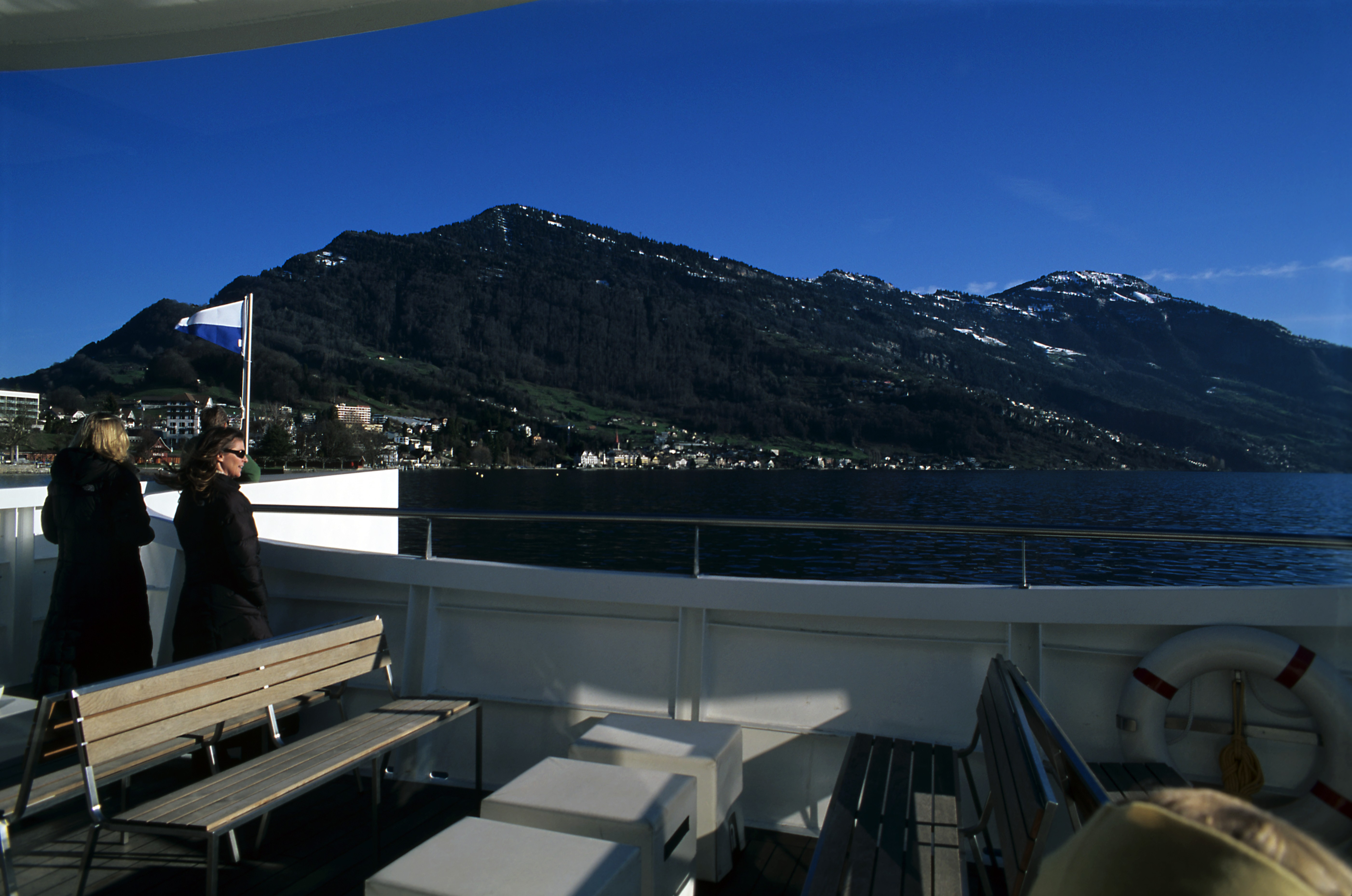
- Peaks of the Rigi: Rotstock (1,650 m [5,410 ft], left), Dossen (centre), Hochflue (1,698 m [5,571 ft], right).

Highest point
- Elevation: 1,685 m (5,528 ft)
- Prominence: 252 m (827 ft)
- Parent peak: Rigi Kulm
- Coordinates: 47°01′37″N 8°29′55.5″E

Geography
- Location within Switzerland Location within Canton of Lucerne Location within Canton of Schwyz
- Country: Switzerland
- Canton: Lucerne and Schwyz
- Parent range: Schwyzer Alps
- Topo map: Swiss Federal Office of Topography swisstopo

Climbing
- Easiest route: Trail

The Dosse (Germanized: Dossen, 1,685 m [5,528 ft]) is a mountain of the Rigi massif, located on the border between the Swiss cantons of Lucerne and Schwyz. The mountain overlooks Lake Lucerne, near Vitznau. It is the highest point of the massif in the canton of Lucerne. The slightly lower peak, only 200 m (660 ft) northwest of it, is called Chli Dosse (1,669 m [5,476 ft]).

== See also ==
- List of mountains of the canton of Schwyz
