= List of cultural property of national significance in Switzerland: Nidwalden =

This list contains all cultural property of national significance (class A) in the canton of Nidwalden from the 2009 Swiss Inventory of Cultural Property of National and Regional Significance. It is sorted by municipality and contains 11 individual buildings, 2 collections, 3 archaeological finds and 1 other, special site or object.

The geographic coordinates provided are in the Swiss coordinate system as given in the Inventory.

== Beckenried ==
| KGS No.^{?} | Picture | Name | Street Address | CH1903 X coordinate | CH1903 Y coordinate | Location |
|---|---|---|---|---|---|---|
| Unknown | | ISOS Verstädtertes Dorf: Beckenried | | | | |
| Unknown | | ISOS Weiler: Ridli | | | | |

== Buochs ==
| KGS No.^{?} | Picture | Name | Street Address | CH1903 X coordinate | CH1903 Y coordinate | Location |
|---|---|---|---|---|---|---|
| Unknown | | ISOS Verstädtertes Dorf: Buochs | | | | |

== Dallenwil ==
| KGS No.^{?} | Picture | Name | Street Address | CH1903 X coordinate | CH1903 Y coordinate | Location |
|---|---|---|---|---|---|---|
| Unknown | | ISOS Weiler: Chappelendorf | | | | |

== Ennetbürgen ==
| KGS No.^{?} | Picture | Name | Street Address | CH1903 X coordinate | CH1903 Y coordinate | Location |
|---|---|---|---|---|---|---|
| 11749 | Hammetschwandlift (Shared with Lucerne) | Hammetschwandlift (Shared with Lucerne) | Bürgenstock | 672.821 | 205.968 | 47.000769°N 8.396128°E |
| Unknown | | ISOS Spezialfall: Bürgenstock Tourismusort | | | | |

== Hergiswil ==
| KGS No.^{?} | Picture | Name | Street Address | CH1903 X coordinate | CH1903 Y coordinate | Location |
|---|---|---|---|---|---|---|
| 4185 | Sigristenhaus «Hostettli» | Sigristenhaus «Hostettli» | Dorfplatz | 666.370 | 204.050 | 46.984194°N 8.311034°E |

== Stans ==
| KGS No.^{?} | Picture | Name | Street Address | CH1903 X coordinate | CH1903 Y coordinate | Location |
|---|---|---|---|---|---|---|
| 9741 | Beinhauskapelle | Beinhauskapelle | Nägeligasse | 670.527 | 201.078 | 46.957033°N 8.365209°E |
| 9643 | Village, Medieval / Early Modern Village | Village, Medieval / Early Modern Village | | 670.597 | 201.069 | 46.956945°N 8.366127°E |
| 9305 | Former Capuchin Monastery of Stans with Library | Former Capuchin Monastery of Stans with Library | Engelbergstrasse 34 | 670.878 | 201.022 | 46.956492°N 8.369811°E |
| 4195 | Höfli (Rosenburg) | Höfli (Rosenburg) | Alter Postplatz 3 | 670.540 | 201.162 | 46.957787°N 8.365393°E |
| 4196 | Catholic Church of St. Peter and Paul | Catholic Church of St. Peter and Paul | Nägeligasse | 670.560 | 201.060 | 46.956868°N 8.36564°E |
| 4197 | Rathaus (Town council house) | Rathaus (Town council house) | Dorfplatz 2 | 670.618 | 201.002 | 46.95634°N 8.366393°E |
| 8785 | State Archives of Nidwalden | State Archives of Nidwalden | Stansstaderstrasse 54 | 670.102 | 201.704 | 46.962709°N 8.359722°E |
| 4224 | Winkelried Monument | Winkelried Monument | Rathausplatz | 670.578 | 201.018 | 46.956488°N 8.36587°E |
| 4198 | Winkelriedhaus or Lussyhaus | Winkelriedhaus or Lussyhaus | Engelbergstrasse | 671.084 | 200.917 | 46.955526°N 8.372501°E |
| Unknown | | ISOS Kleinstadt / Flecken: Stans | | | | |

== Stansstad ==
| KGS No.^{?} | Picture | Name | Street Address | CH1903 X coordinate | CH1903 Y coordinate | Location |
|---|---|---|---|---|---|---|
| Unknown | | Kehrsiten, Neolithic Lake Shore Settlement | | | | |
| 9646 | Teller / Palisaden, Medieval Fortification (including Schnitzturm) | Teller / Palisaden, Medieval Fortification (including Schnitzturm) | | 668.400 | 203.710 | 46.980929°N 8.337663°E |
| Unknown | | ISOS Weiler: Kehrsiten | | | | |
| Unknown | | ISOS Spezialfall: Bürgenstock Tourismusort | | | | |

== Wolfenschiessen ==
| KGS No.^{?} | Picture | Name | Street Address | CH1903 X coordinate | CH1903 Y coordinate | Location |
|---|---|---|---|---|---|---|
| 4230 | Farm House Grossitz | Farm House Grossitz | Hauptstrasse 31 | 672.867 | 195.362 | 46.905368°N 8.395033°E |
| 4231 | Farm House Unteres Brunnifeld | Farm House Unteres Brunnifeld | Hauptstrasse 41 | 672.808 | 195.169 | 46.903638°N 8.394228°E |
| 4232 | Hechhuis (Lussyhaus) | Hechhuis (Lussyhaus) | Hochhaus | 672.541 | 194.945 | 46.901653°N 8.390688°E |
| 10123 | House | House | Hofstatt im Dörfli | 672.635 | 194.452 | 46.897208°N 8.391843°E |
