= Franz Josef Bucher =

Swiss business magnate, politician and patron

Member of Cantonal Council of Obwalden
- In office 1884–1896

Personal details
- Born: Franz Josef Bucher; 17 January 1834 Kerns, Obwalden, Switzerland
- Died: 6 October 1906 (aged 72) Cairo, Kingdom of Egypt
- Children: 14
- Parent(s): Sebastian Bucher; Theresia Durrer
- Occupation: Business magnate, hotel and railroad pioneer, politician

Franz Josef Bucher (17 January 1834 – 6 October 1906) was a Swiss business magnate, politician and patron who built his wealth in hotels and railroads. Bucher established the Bürgenstock hotel complex and was the owner and patron of Europe's largest hotel company in the 19th century. At the time of his death, his net worth was estimated at 14 million Swiss Francs (equal to about 160 million Swiss Francs in 2023). Between 1886 and 1896, Bucher served as a member of the Cantonal Council of Obwalden. He was an energetic entrepreneur who attracted anecdotes reflecting his original and direct approach.

== Early life and education ==
Bucher was born in Kerns, Obwalden, a small town roughly 22 km (15 miles) south of Lucerne. His father, Sébastien Bucher, was a farmer and local councilor. The boy attended the school in Kerns and then went on to college in the cantonal capital, Sarnen, a short distance further up the valley to the south.

== Career ==
After some years working as a herdsman and farmer he teamed up with Joseph Durrer, his future brother in law to form, in 1864, the business "Bucher & Durrer". In 1868, the two of them opened a factory on the edge of Sarnen, at Kägiswil, where they constructed timber flooring, soon moving on to become constructors of timber barns and houses.

=== The hotelier ===
In 1869/70, "Bucher & Durrer" built their first hotel, the "Sonnenberg-Hotel" in Engelberg. They sold it at a profit after a year. In 1871, Bucher purchased the lakeside "Trittalp" meadow located on a ridge on the Bürgenstock (mountain). Here he built the 220 bed "Grand Hotel Kurhaus", subsequently renamed "Grand Hotel Bürgenstock", which opened in 1873. Bucher oversaw the construction himself. The luxury hotel was a success, which led to expansion. Between 1887 and 1905, the Bürgenstock Hotel grew into a substantial hotel resort-complex. To improve access to the inherently inaccessible mountaintop hotel, a funicular railway, claimed to be the first electric railway in Switzerland, was opened in 1888. After early technical challenges had been overcome, the funicular became a highly effective tourist magnet. The Bürgenstock also featured electric lighting and electric elevators many years before these features became mainstream, and long before public power supplies became the norm. Bucher built a hydro-electric generating plant, which came into operation in 1886/87, for the growing complex. An additional use for the power supply came with the construction in 1905 of the remarkable Hammetschwand Lift / Elevator, an outdoor device that carries visitors up a vertical distance of more than 100 meters on order to access a look-out position with views across Lake Lucerne.

During the 1880s, the business activities of Bucher and his partner Joseph Durrer diverged, with Durrer focusing on timber based building and construction, while Bucher concentrated on the hotel business. However, it was only in 1895 that the business of "Bucher & Durrer" was formally split. Bucher's portion of the business was renamed "Schweizerische Hotelgesellschaft", which by the start of the twentieth century had become the largest hotels undertaking in the world, as Franz Josef Bucher, supported by his growing family, constructed a succession of luxury hotels in and beyond Europe. Particularly high profile creations included the Hotel Quirinal in Rome and the Hotel Palace Luzern. The last hotel he created was the Hotel Semiramis in Cairo, where it is reported that he simultaneously employed 300 European construction workers together with a further 1,000 Egyptians: Bucher himself died shortly before the Semiramis opened in 1906.

Sources differ as to whether by his two marriages, Bucher had 14 or 15 recorded children. Six of his sons took leading positions in his hotels business and which also employed his sons-in-law and many remoter kinsfolk. Following his death, his sons Fritz and Arnold took over leadership of the business.

=== The railway pioneer ===
It was on Bucher's personal initiative that "Bucher & Durrer" constructed the Stansstad–Stans electric tramline, connecting the paddle-steamer quay at the southwestern end of Lake Lucerne with the base station for the Stanserhorn funicular railway, which was also constructed by Bucher's firm. The railway opened in 1893 and attracted much interest due to its technical innovations, notably in respect of the braking system (Zangenbremsen). Further railways constructed by the firm included the Monte San Salvatore funicular opened on the edge of Lugano in 1890, the short but steep funicular in Lugano linking the city to its mainline station (1886), the Reichenbach Falls funicular (1899) and the Vevey–Chardonne–Mont-Pèlerin funicular (1900).

Bucher's railway building was not restricted to Switzerland. In Genoa he built the funicular at the Mura delle Chiappe (1896) and an electric tramline, necessary to provide adequate access to his newly purchased hotel in the city. On its completion, he sold the tramline to the municipality for one million Swiss francs, which he insisted on receiving in cash. This he placed in a large linen sack which he took back to Kerns, proudly showing fellow villagers his first million and buying drinks for many. He also had himself photographed in his garden at home, accompanied by the cash, his wife, and two of their children, using a new medium to provide visual evidence of his enhanced credit-worthiness. Asked why he had nevertheless, as usual, traveled home in a third class railway carriage, he is said to have explained that the Gotthard Railway did not offer a fourth class. Having celebrated his triumph with his neighbours he set off with his bag of cash for Rome, where he used it to buy the Hotel Quirinal. This was not the only time that Josef Bucher drew attention with his unconventional business methods.

=== The quirky magnate ===
Despite commercial success, Josef Bucher always retained an underlying humility. He never ate with the guests in his hotel dining rooms, but insisted on eating with the hotel personnel. Various legends circulate in this connection. On one occasion he noticed that only one of the tables in the staff canteen had a tablecloth on it. He was given to understand that the table with the cloth on it was set aside for senior staff, whereupon he seized one end and pulled the cloth, together with the contents of the table, onto the floor.

Although he did business in many countries across two continents, Josef Bucher never bothered to master foreign languages. Instructions were habitually delivered in the pithy dialect of his home canton. Despite the importance within his hotels empire of Ticino, Rome and Genoa, it was said that the only word of Italian that he uttered with any frequency was "Avanti!".

== Politics ==
Josef Bucher was a local councillor in Kerns, also serving, between 1884 and 1896, on the Cantonal Council. He was an instigator, co-founder and board member of the Cantonal Bank.
