= International Board =

International Board may refer to:

- International Football Association Board, association football governing body
- International Rugby League Board, defunct rugby league football governing body
