= Bürgenstock Resort =

Hotel and tourism complex in Nidwalden, Switzerland

Coordinates: 46.996601°N 8.3793878°E

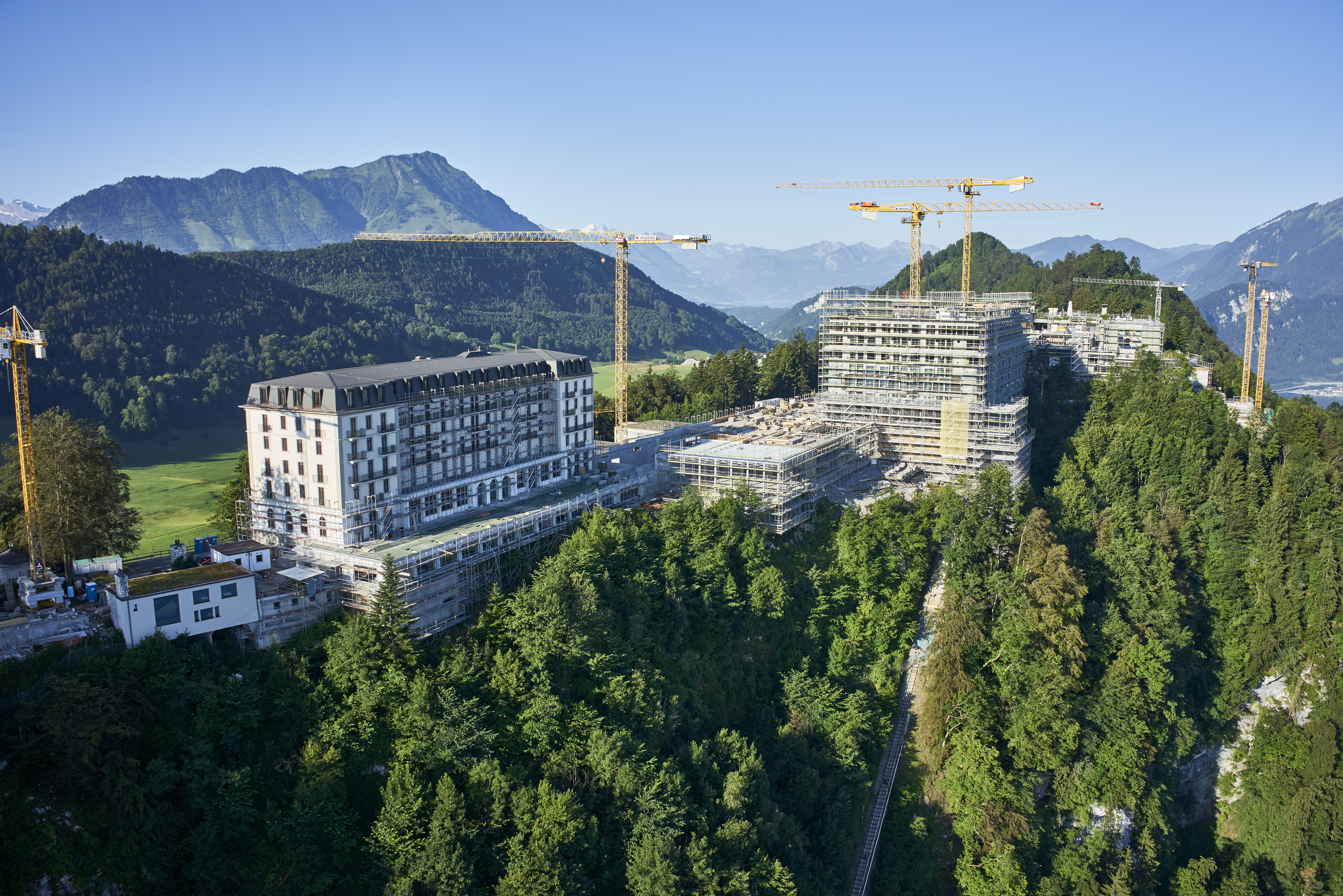
Bürgenstock Resort Lake Lucerne

Bürgenstock Resort Lake Lucerne is a Swiss luxury resort and tourism complex situated above Lake Lucerne in Canton of Nidwalden, Switzerland. The resort is located on the Bürgenberg and comprises a total of 30 buildings, including three hotels, residences, two spas, a conference centre and a number of leisure facilities. It is the largest integrated hotel resort in Switzerland. The complex is built above a ridge offering north-facing views of the lake 500 metres below. Linking resort and lake is the Bürgenstock Funicular. Views to the south encompass mountains and scattered settlements on their flanks. The resort is of cultural and historical significance.

After major works that began in 2014, the resort was reopened in 2017.

== History ==
Franz Josef Bucher and Josef Durrer (1841–1919) were businessmen from Kerns, Canton Obwalden. They had a sawmill and a factory making wood flooring in Kerns. To keep their workforces in employment, the two men built the Hotel Sonnenberg in Engelberg in 1869/70, which they were able to sell at a profit one year after completion.

Their company Bucher & Durrer purchased Alp Tritt on the Bürgenberg in 1871 and applied the name to their new hotel development. The Grand Hotel opened on 23 June 1873 under its original name of Hotel Kurhaus. In 1886 and 1887, Bucher and Durrer built a hydroelectric plant on the Engelberger Aa river in Buochs to power the funicular between the lake and the Bürgenstock Hotels, as well as the Stanserhorn funicular. In 1888, the company opened the Bürgenstock Funicular and began provision of the resort's water supply. Also, in 1888 the Park Hotel opened, followed by the Bürgenstock Chapel in 1892, the Palace Hotel in 1903, and the erection of a number of villas to the east of the latter between 1900 and 1905. The Hammetschwand Lift opened in 1905. Bucher acquired sole control of the company in 1895.

On the southern side of the Bürgenstock is the Villa Honegg, a hotel built and opened in 1906 by Emil Durrer (1873–1923), a nephew of Franz Josef Bucher. It remained a family-run establishment until 1977. Following further renovation, the hotel reopened in 2011.

Friedrich Frey-Fürst (1882–1953) purchased the Bürgenstock hotels in 1925. From 1925 to 1948 the three hotels underwent significant renovation. A golf course opened in 1928. Management of the resort passed to Friedrich Frey's son Fritz on the former's death in 1953. Fritz Frey made a number of changes to the buildings and infrastructure.

The family sold the Bürgenstock Resort to the major Swiss bank UBS in 1996. The buildings were acquired in 2000 by Richemont Héritage SA of Vich, Canton Vaud together with five other five-star hotels indebted to the UBS for about CHF 115 million. The company changed its name to Rosebud Hotels Holding SA in 2003 after disposing of its Hotel Richemont. The Barwa Real Estate Company, domiciled in the State of Qatar, took a 50% holding in the company's assets in 2007 which, alongside the Bürgenstock Hotels, comprised the Schweizerhof in Bern and Royal Savoy in Lausanne. The Barwa Real Estate Company separated from Rosebud Hotels Holding SA in 2008 to become sole owner of the Bürgenstock Hotels. The Barwa Real Estate Company transferred its Swiss hotel portfolio to the Qatari Diar Real Estate Investment Company in 2009. The latter is wholly owned by the State of Qatar; its subsidiary QDHP Swiss Management AG was responsible for managing the Swiss hotel projects. In 2007 Katara Hospitality, a subsidiary of the Qatar Investment Authority (Qatar's sovereign wealth fund), became the new investor. The Bürgenstock Selection brand was created that same year, afterwards named into Bürgenstock Collection. This incorporates the new Bürgenstock Resort Lake Lucerne, the Hotel Royal Savoy in Lausanne and the Hotel Schweizerhof in Bern. The Swiss activities were transferred in 2012 to Katara Hospitality Switzerland AG, domiciled in Zug.

=== New resort built ===
In 2014, work began to create a more modern resort. To safeguard Bürgenstock Resort's testimony to Switzerland's post-Second World War tourism heritage, a protection plan was put in place. Alongside the Grand Hotel and Palace Hotel, this comprised numerous smaller buildings erected in the 1950s and 1960s. The Office of Historical Monuments of the Canton of Nidwalden, the owners, Nidwalden's cantonal council (in NW: German: Regierungsrat) and the municipality's government sought successfully to preserve the historical buildings by establishing a committee mandated with developing a master plan to place the buildings under heritage protection. The historical weather station has since been relocated to a different site.

=== Changes since 2014 ===
The cornerstone for the new resort was laid on 26 March 2014. The resort on the Bürgenberg mountain is completely car-free and comprises 30 buildings. These include three hotels ranging in standard from three to five star Superior and offering a total of 360 rooms and suites: the Bürgenstock Hotel & Alpine Spa, the Waldhotel by Bürgenstock, and Taverne 1879. Also emerging is a 2,200 square metres (24,000 sq ft) conference centre capable of accommodating up to 600 persons. The resort also features 17 residence suites, and 12 restaurants, lounges and bars. It opened in summer 2017, and is operating all year round. The total investment volume is CHF 650 million.

The resort boasts the 10,000 square metres (110,000 sq ft) Bürgenstock Alpine Spa with an indoor and an outdoor area and five swimming pools, saunas, a hammam, steam room, showers, three Private Spa Suites and a gym.

The 9-hole golf course was re-opened on 25 June 2016. On the same day, the foundation and the University of Teacher Education Lucerne opened a 1.5 kilometres (0.93 mi) learning trail on the cliff path.

CHF 43 million were invested in monument and landscape conservation measures. The old broidery building 'Stickerei' has been restored to its original plans, while the historically important Palace Hotel, which dates from 1903, was being renovated in compliance with requirements imposed by heritage and monument agencies. The Swiss Inventory of Cultural Property of National and Regional Significance (the KGS inventory) lists a number of buildings and facilities in the Bürgenstock Resort deemed worthy of protection. The inventory draws a distinction between assets of national importance (A assets) and of regional importance (B assets). 'A' assets in the Bürgenstock Resort include the pool in the Bürgenstock Club, the 'Stickerei', the Gübelin building, the weather station, and the 'Rondelle'. The resort's 'B' assets are the Palace Hotel, the Blockhaus, the Spycher, the Grand Hotel, the Restaurant Taverne and Taverne 1879, the Bürgenstock Funicular, and the Hammetschwand Lift.

The buildings and facilities of the Bürgenstock Resort are also listed in the Federal Inventory of Swiss Heritage Sites (ISOS). The Lake Lucerne landscape with Kernwald, Bürgenstock and Rigi is listed in the Federal Inventory of Landscapes and Natural Monuments of National Importance.

In a 2012 study, BAK Basel Economics AG wrote that the new resort will provide economic benefits to the Central Swiss region. The study predicted that the new Bürgenstock Resort will attracted new affluent visitors to the region, generating 150,000 extra overnight stays. According to the study, revenues generated by the new Bürgenstock Resort once fully up and running could be in the region of CHF 100 million for the resort, and 40 million for its suppliers. The study estimates that the project will generate annual tax revenues of about CHF 8 million for the cantons and municipalities of Central Switzerland. By 2020, the latter's cumulative tax revenues directly attributable to the resort's operations could reach CHF 33 million. It is estimated that one job is created outside the resort for every three inside it. In terms of employment in Canton Nidwalden's economy as a whole, the resort's share is 3.6 percent.

=== Famous guests ===
Audrey Hepburn and Mel Ferrer got married in the Bürgenstock Chapel in 1954. Sophia Loren and her husband Carlo Ponti resided for seven years in one of the villas. German Chancellor Konrad Adenauer spent the summer months of July and August 1950 in the resort and conducted affairs of state there. Jawaharlal Nehru had a holiday in the resort in 1951, accompanied for the first time by his daughter Indira Gandhi. Two years later he met Austria’s foreign minister there, Karl Gruber. The film crew shooting the James Bond film Goldfinger resided at the Palace Hotel in 1964 alongside Bond actor Sean Connery. American politicians such as Jimmy Carter and Henry Kissinger have also been guests at the resort.

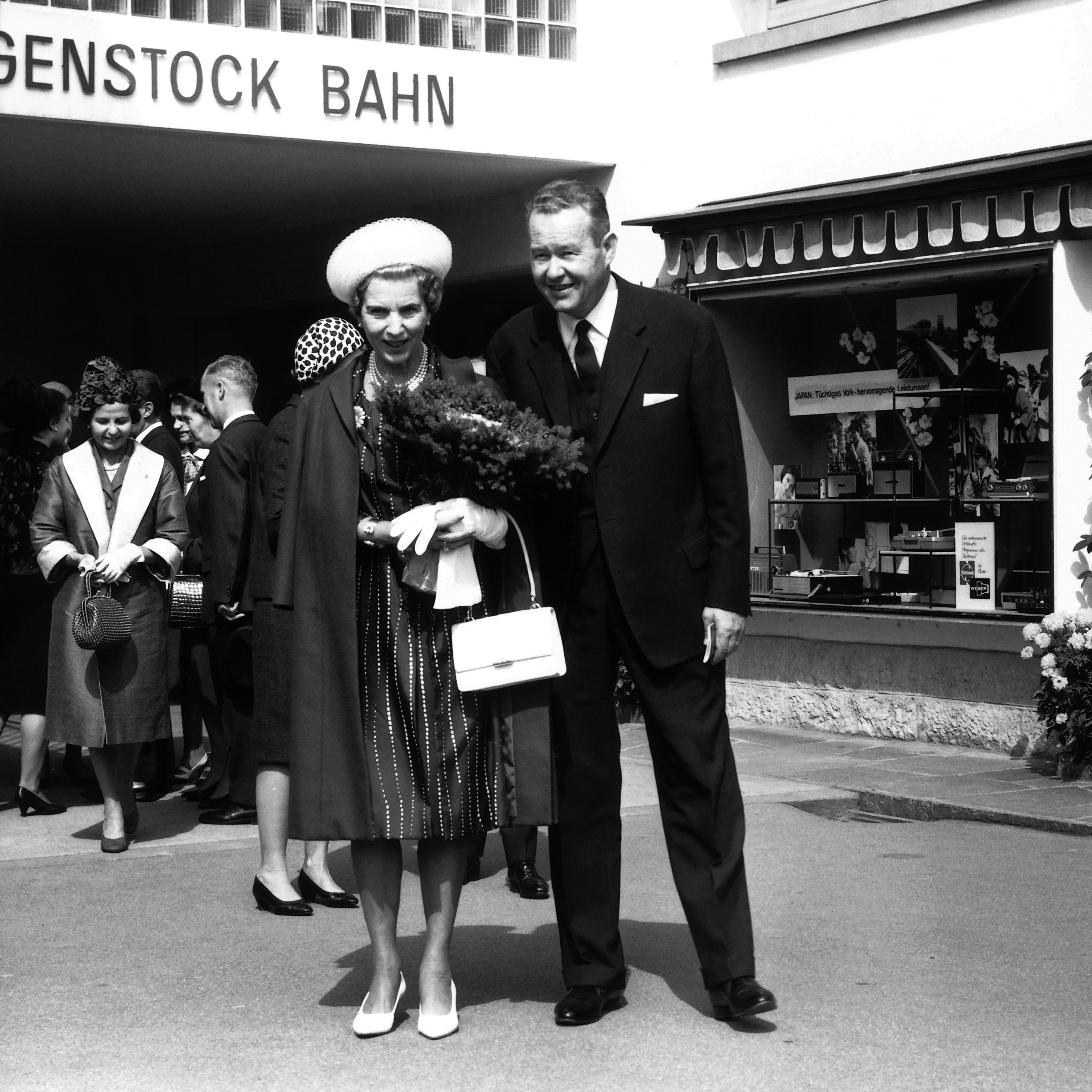
Queen Ingrid of Denmark on the Bürgenstock, late 1940s

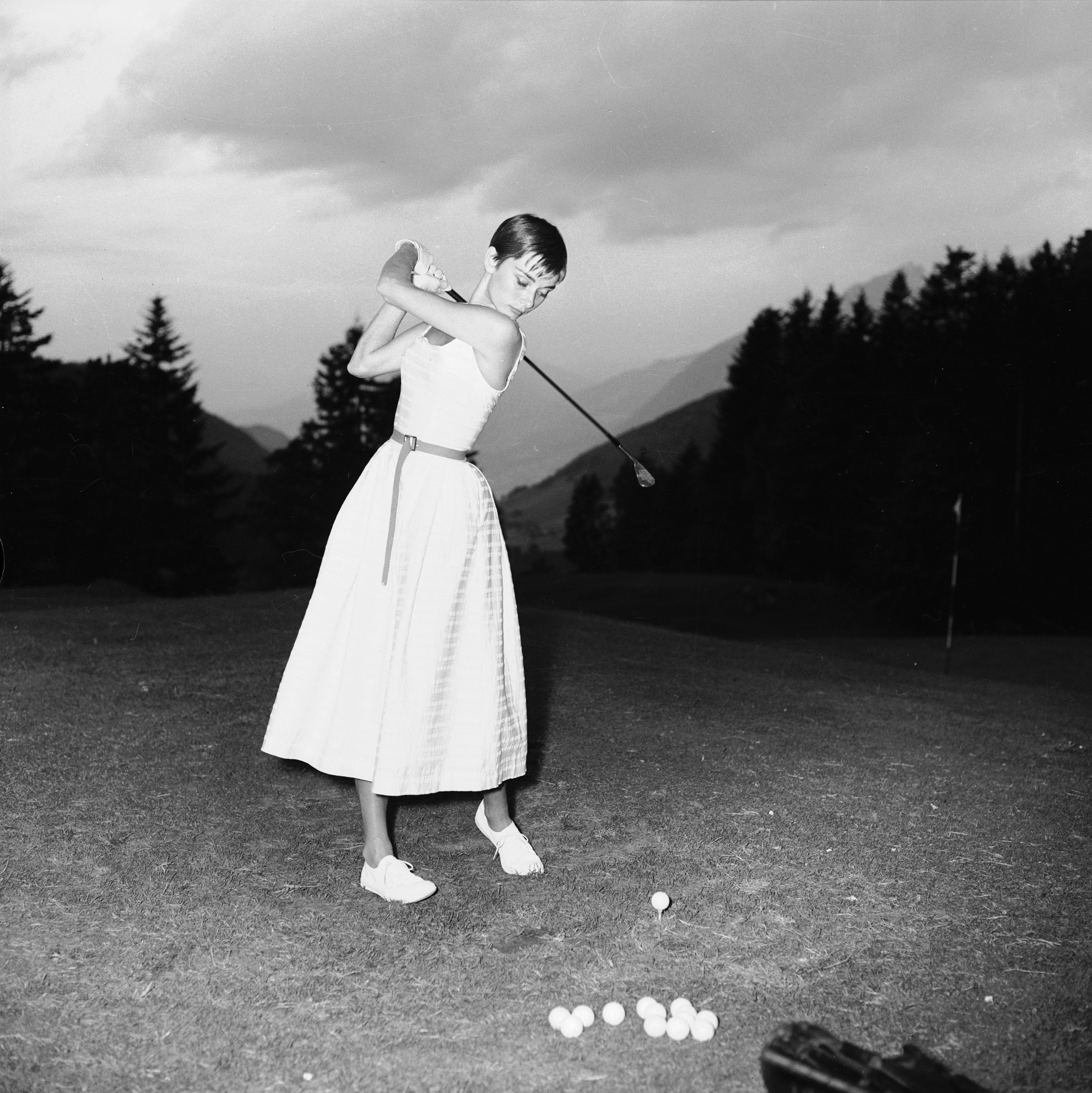
Audrey Hepburn on the golf course, mid-1950s

=== Important conferences ===
The resort has also been the place for several important international conferences over the years. In 1960 and 1995 the Bilderberg Meetings where held there; in early 2002, the belligerents in the Second Sudanese Civil War held a first meeting there after 19 years of war, this eventually led to a peace agreement in 2005; in spring 2004, Bürgenstock Resort was the site for negotiations between Turkish and Greek Cypriots on the issue of accession to the European Union; and the Summit on Peace in Ukraine to initiate a peace agreement in the Russo-Ukrainian War on 15 - 16 June 2024. In 2026 it was the location of peace negotiations between the United States and Iran.
