= Bürgenstock =

Mountain in Switzerland

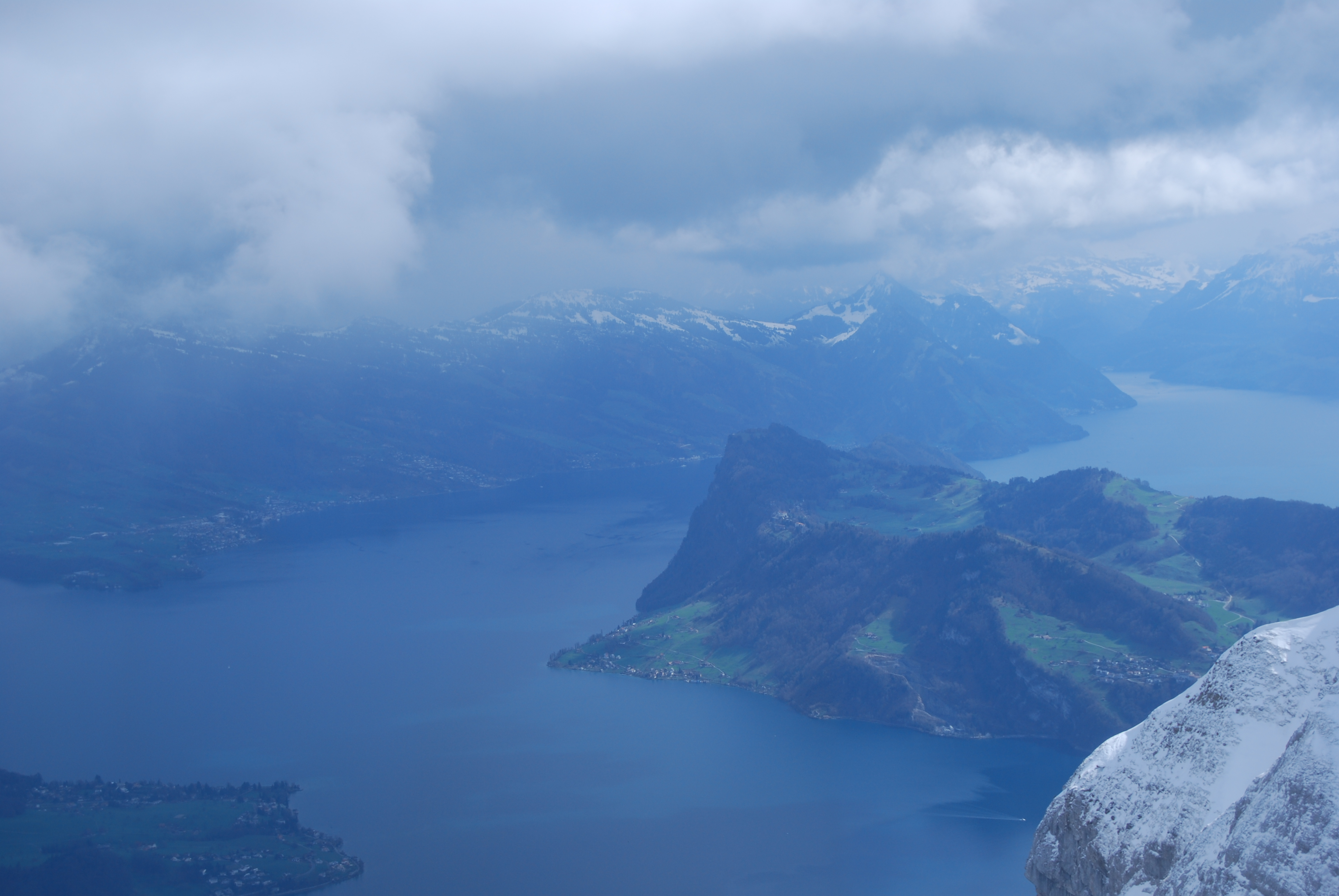
- The Bürgenstock (centre-right) from Pilatus

Highest point
- Elevation: 1,128 m (3,701 ft)
- Prominence: 683 m (2,241 ft)
- Isolation: 5.2 km (3.2 mi)
- Coordinates: 47°00′01.19″N 8°23′55.24″E

Geography
- Location within Switzerland
- Location: Cantons of Nidwalden and Lucerne, Switzerland
- Parent range: Urner Alps

Climbing
- Easiest route: elevator

The Bürgenstock (Swiss Standard German pronunciation: [ˈbʏrɡn̩ʃtɔk]) is a mountain in Switzerland with an elevation of 1,128 m (3,701 ft) above sea level, situated beside Lake Lucerne. Since the late 19th century, the Bürgenstock is the site of a large hotel and conference centre, today known as Bürgenstock Resort, situated some 600 m (2,000 ft) above Lake Lucerne.

== Etymology ==
When viewed from Lucerne, the Bürgenstock has the typical mountain shape of a Stock. In the German-speaking part of Switzerland, the term Stock is used for a number of mountains whose shape of summits are clearly set off from the bulk.

The term Bürgenstock, composed of the descriptive words "Bürgen" and "Stock", has evolved since the mid-19th century into the geographical name for the distinctive mountain on the "Bürgen" peninsula as seen from Lucerne.

From the early Middle Ages on, the mountain on this peninsula was called Bürgenberg , an arbitral settlement from the year 1378, putting an end to over 38 years of dispute between the Lucerne and Nidwalden estates about the affiliation of the region extending from Kehrsiten to Mattgrat, uses the name Bürgenberg in its records.

Old maps and frontier records of the Corporation of Lucerne, which mention the – in those times – disputed forest call it the Stadtwald am Bürgenberg (town forest on the Bürgenberg) or Bürgenbergwald (Bürgenberg forest).

On the Dufourkarte (Dufour Map), the topographic map of Switzerland from 1844 to 1864, the mountain ridge as a whole had no name. The highest crest was referred to as Hametschwand.

Aloys Businger first documented the geographical name Bürgenstock in 1836 in his book Der Kanton Unterwalden. Businger calls the entire Bürgen peninsula the Bürgenberg. However, he refers to the highest elevation both as Hammetschwand and Bürgenstock.

In addition, the director of the Lucerne Teachers' Training College, Niklaus Rietschi, published a private map in 1850, in which the terms Bürgenstock together with the term Hammetschwand are recorded for the summit.

In 1872, the company Bucher & Durrer laid the foundation for the hotel complex on the Alp Tritt. For this purpose, it chose the already existing geographical name of Bürgenstock, also documented in 1836 by Aloys Businger in his book “Der Kanton Unterwalden”.

The first official map to use the geographical name Bürgenstock was the so-called "Siegfriedkarte" Siegfried Map, whose publication, started by the Federal Topographic Bureau under Hermann Siegfried, continued from 1870 until 1926. The name Bürgenstock appears on sheet 377 of the Siegfried Map and dates back to 1896.

Around 1900, the designation Bürgenstock established itself as a general colloquial term for the entire mountain ridge, from Stansstad in the West to "Untere Nase" in the East. A corresponding entry in the "Geographischen Lexikon der Schweiz" (Geographical Dictionary of Switzerland) can be found in 1910.

In the Swiss maps of our days, the name Bürgenstock designates the mountain ridge – with the term Hammetschwand as an alternative – as well as the location of the hotel and residential complex. Bürgenstock, as a geographical name, can be found twice in the official Swiss index of cities and towns. The locality Bürgenstock is listed in the postal code listing of Switzerland under the postal code 6363. Today, the residential streets of the valley communities Stansstad and Ennetbürgen, connecting the entire mountain ridge, carry the name Bürgenstockstrasse.

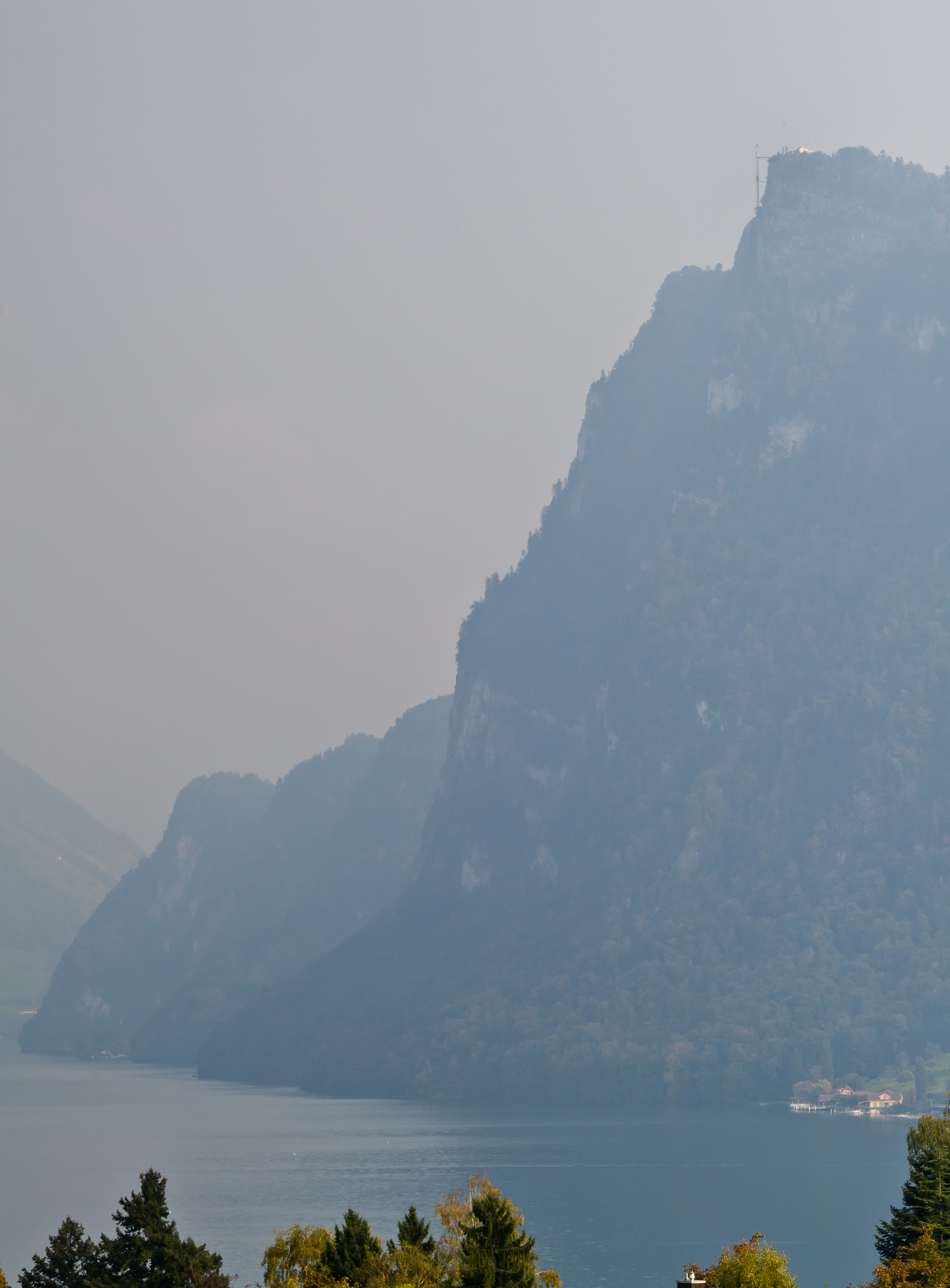
The almost vertical north face of the Bürgenstock with Hammetschwand Elevator visible on the top

== Geographical situation ==
Bürgenstock stretches over 10 km (6.2 mi) and is surrounded to the north, east and southeast by Lake Lucerne. The northern slope drops steeply into the lake, 685 m (2,247 ft) below the peak. At the bottom of its southern slope is the municipality of Ennetbürgen; The municipality Stansstad is situated at the bottom of its western end.

For the most part, the mountain belongs to the municipality of Ennetbürgen in the canton of Nidwalden. The western part belongs to the municipality of Stansstad. A part of the northern steep drop into the lake is an exclave of the city of Lucerne and is called Bürgenberg (aka citizen's mountain).

== Geology ==
Bürgenstock belongs to the foothills of the Pilatus and the Helvetic border chain. The rocks are from the Cretaceous and Tertiary. Below the Hammetschwand, the following layers can be distinguished on the north side: siliceous limestone, Drusberg layers (forming a forest belt), bright Schrattenkalk limestone with orbitolina layers overlaid by Seewerkalk limestone.

Above this, there is a transgression of Assilina Greensand and Nummulitic limestone of Lutetian age, which is found mainly on the southern downward slope with its gentler incline.

During the last ice age, the Bürgenstock was completely covered by an ice stream flowing from the Gotthard into the foothills of the Alps. Abrasion marks left by the ice on the limestone are found including in the highest altitudes. Large granite boulders which were transported by the ice from the Gotthard, are distributed over the whole mountain, as for example an 18 m3 large, round specimen on a steep slope on the Allwägli land reserve, which in 1949 was placed under protection. After the regression of the ice, the Bürgenstock was at first an island in Lake Lucerne. In the course of a few thousand years, however, the Engelberger Aa River filled up the area between the Engelberger valley entrance and the Bürgenstock with sediments, creating today's flat valley between the townships Ennetbürgen, Buochs, Stans and Stansstad.

== Tourism ==
Near the top that has been a large hotel and conference area since 1872. Today that area is known as Bürgenstock Resort. Beside several hotels, it includes Europe's tallest outdoor lift, the Hammetschwand Lift, which connects the scenic cliff path with the Hammetschwand vantage point, the Bürgenstock Funicular, which since 1888 has taken passengers from a steam boat pier on Lake Lucerne up to the hotels, and the Bürgenstock Chapel from 1897, made famous in 1954 when actors Audrey Hepburn and Mel Ferrer were married there. The resort has also been the place for several important international conferences through the years.

== See also ==
- List of mountains of Switzerland accessible by public transport
