= Fürigenbahn =

Funicular railway at Lake Lucerne, Switzerland

- Fürigen with hotel, the funicular, the bay (1948)

Overview
- Other name: Drahtseilbahn von der Harissenbucht bei Stansstad nach Fürigen
- Status: ceased operation
- Owner: Fürigen Hotel AG
- Locale: Stansstad, Nidwalden, Switzerland
- Termini: Harissenbucht; Fürigen
- Stations: 2
- Website: hotel-fuerigen.ch (archived)

Service
- Type: Funicular
- Route number: 1552
- Rolling stock: 2 for 14 passengers each

History
- Opened: spring 1924
- Concession: 1927 (for 80 years)
- Closure hotel: 2010
- Closed: 31 October 2005 (20 years ago)

Technical
- Line length: 380 m (1,250 ft)
- Number of tracks: 1 with passing loop
- Track gauge: 800 mm (2 ft 7 1/2 in)
- Electrification: from opening
- Highest elevation: 639 m (2,096 ft)
- Maximum incline: 73%

Fürigenbahn was a funicular railway above Lake Lucerne at Stansstad, Nidwalden, Switzerland. The line led from the resort in Harissenbucht, a bay of Lake Lucerne, at 437 m (1,434 ft) to the Hotel Fürigen at 639 m (2,096 ft). The track had a length of 375 m (1,230 ft) with a difference of elevation of 202 m (663 ft) and a maximum incline of 73%. The hotel built it for clients' use in spring 1924, but opened it to the public in 1927, after the Swiss Federal Assembly granted a license for 80 years. The funicular ceased operations in October 2005, the license expired in March 2007, and the hotel closed in 2010.

== History ==
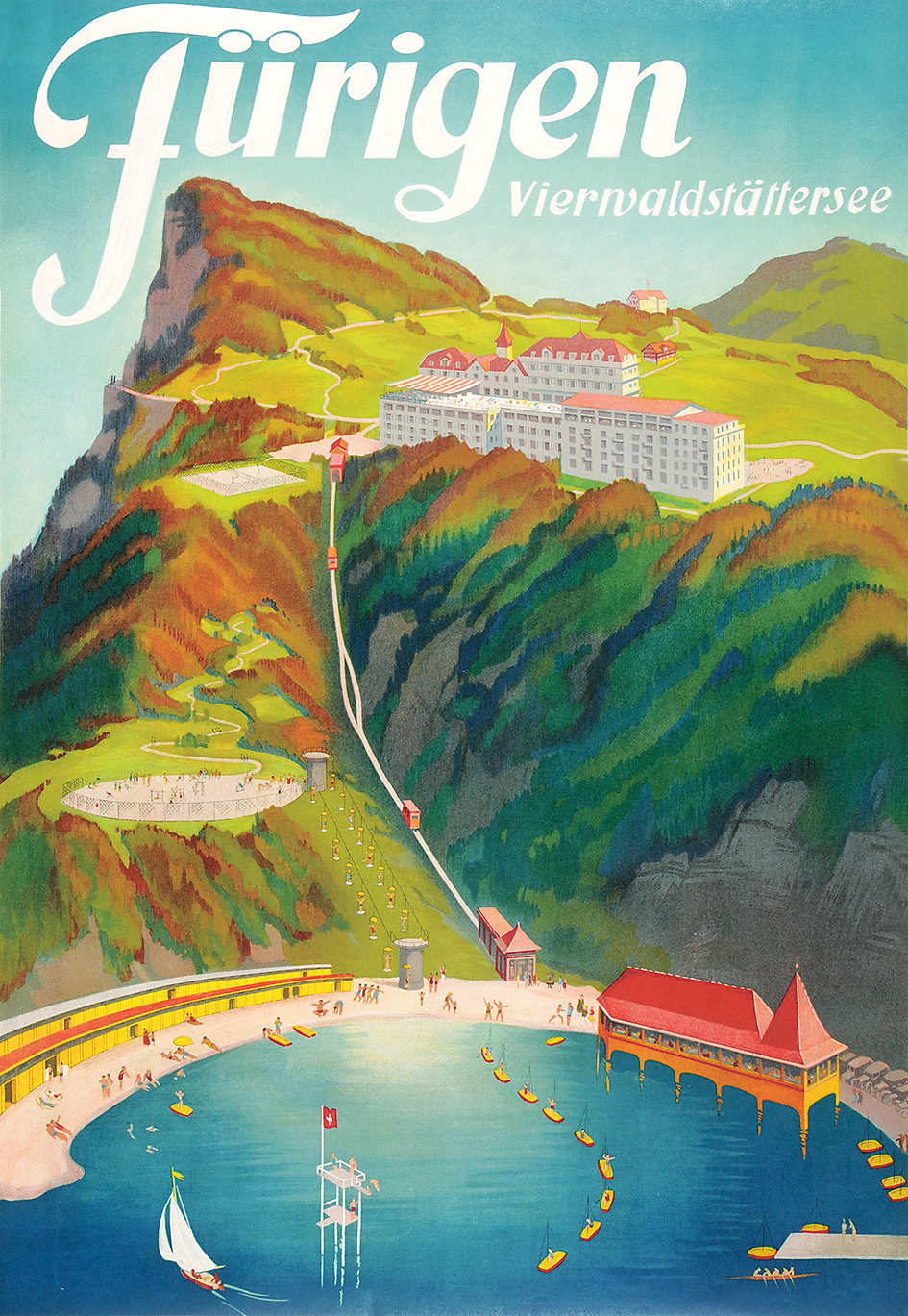

In 1910 a new resort hotel was opened at Stansstad and a funicular was built between the hotel and the sea for the hotel guests. This connection made the distance between the small public bath with bath and boat house more manageable for the hotel guests. The funicular opened in 1924 and was made available for public transport three years later. The construction of a road to the hotel began years of profit-losses for the operations. Paul Odermatt (1879-1970) forfeited the license in 1927. Following his death the hotel and the funicular were sold to the newly founded Fürigen Hotel AG. The last time the funicular operated was on October 31st, 2005.

== Future ==
An association founded in 2020, Interessengemeinschaft Erhalt Fürigen Bahn (IG-EFB) sought to enable the line to be operational for the 100th anniversary in 2024. Whilst the line has not been restored for its 100th anniversary, the organisation still strives to restore the line.
