= International Football Association Board =

Body that determines the rules of association football

- Logo
- Abbreviation: IFAB
- Founded: 2 June 1886; 140 years ago
- Founded at: Manchester, England
- Type: Self-regulatory body
- Purpose: Management of the Laws of the Game
- Headquarters: Zürich, Switzerland
- Location(s): Commonly; England; Scotland; Northern Ireland; Wales
- Region served: Worldwide
- Members: FIFA, The FA, SFA, FAW, IFA
- Secretary: Lukas Brud
- Website: www.theifab.com

The International Football Association Board (IFAB) is an international self-regulatory body of association football that manages the Laws of the Game, the regulations for the gameplay of football.

IFAB was founded in 1886 in order to establish standardised regulations or "Laws" for the gameplay of international competition, and has since acted as the primary maintainer ("Guardian") of these Laws. The football associations of England, Scotland, Northern Ireland and Wales hold permanent membership status on the board, as does FIFA, the predominant global governing body for football, which has recognised IFAB's jurisdiction over its Laws since its establishment in 1904.

Presently, FIFA holds 50% of the voting power and amendments to the Laws mandate a three-quarter supermajority vote. As a result, FIFA's support is necessary but not sufficient for a motion to pass.

== History ==
=== Establishment ===
The Laws of the Game in 1903

Although the rules of football had largely been standardised by the early 1880s, England's Football Association (the FA), the Scottish Football Association (SFA), the Football Association of Wales (FAW) and the Irish Football Association (IFA) had conflicting rules. When international matches were played, the rules of the home team's national association were used. While this solution was technically feasible, it was impractical. To remedy this, the FAs initialised a meeting on 6 December 1882 in Queen's Hotel, Manchester in order to systematise a set of rules that could be applied uniformly to matches between the UK football associations' national teams. This was later named the "International Football Conference".

In the summer of 1885, the English FA declared that it legalised professionalism. The Scottish FA responded that it would refuse to allow professionals in its own national team, and would refuse to play international matches against an England team containing professionals. The Irish FA attempted to arbitrate by proposing that "an international conference should be held each year, say, in August, to be called in turn by each national association to deal with the laws of the game, and discuss other matters of interest to Association football, and at which international disputes could be adjusted".

=== Inaugural meeting and FIFA's integration ===
The initial meeting of IFAB took place at The FA's offices at Holborn Viaduct in London on 2 June 1886. The FA, SFA, FAW and IFA each had equal voting rights. It was chaired by Sir Francis Marindin, and attended by Charles W. Alcock acting as Secretary. The meeting was notable for Marindin's proposal, which outlined "That no player shall wear any kind of projection on the soles of heels of his boots with the exception of flat leather bars of an approved pattern".

During IFAB's annual general meeting (AGM) on 8 June 1912, the secretary, J.K. McDowall, scrutinised a letter that was attributed to the recently established FIFA, requesting that IFAB would invite a member of FIFA to sit on the Board. The petition was analysed, and IFAB concluded that it wasn't the right time to establish FIFA as a member, and McDowall proceeded to write a response to the organisation explaining the consensus. At a special meeting held on 25 January 1913 in Wrexham, IFAB approved FIFA's request after a proposition by The FA was made proposing that two members from FIFA should attend the board, making FIFA the fifth member of IFAB.

=== Post-war ===
For the first four post-war IFAB meetings (1920, 1921, 1922, and 1923), FIFA was once again excluded, on account of a dispute between FIFA and the home nations regarding payments to amateur players. From 1924, the dispute had been reconciled, and FIFA resumed attendance of IFAB meetings. In 1958, the Board agreed on a voting system that would be used to this day.

Since Irish partition in 1921, the IFA has evolved to become the organising body for football in Northern Ireland, with football in the Republic of Ireland being organised by the FAI. A request for the FAI to become a member of IFAB was denied at the 1923 annual general meeting.

== Operations ==
=== Membership ===
The IFAB is made up of representatives from England's Football Association (The FA), the Scottish Football Association (SFA), the Football Association of Wales (FAW) and Northern Ireland's Irish Football Association (IFA)—and the Fédération Internationale de Football Association (FIFA, the International Association Football Federation), the international governing body for football. The associations of England, Northern Ireland, Scotland and Wales have one vote each and FIFA has four. IFAB deliberations must be approved by three-quarters of the vote, or at least six of the eight votes. Thus, FIFA's approval is necessary for any IFAB decision, but FIFA alone cannot change the Laws of the Game—they need to be agreed by at least two members – either England, Scotland, Wales or Northern Ireland. As of 2016, all members must be present for a binding vote to proceed.

==== List of members ====
Country/Organisation	Association	Membership status	Represented since
England	The Football Association	Permanent	1886
Scotland	Scottish Football Association	Permanent	1886
Northern Ireland	Irish Football Association	Permanent	1886
Wales	Football Association of Wales	Permanent	1886
FIFA		Permanent	1913

=== Meetings of the board ===
The Board meets twice a year, once to decide on possible changes to the rules governing the game of Football (the Annual General Meeting (AGM)) and once to deliberate on its internal affairs (the Annual Business Meeting (ABM)). In FIFA World Cup years, the AGM is held at FIFA's offices; otherwise, it rotates between Northern Ireland, Wales, England and Scotland in that order. Four weeks before the AGM, the member associations must send their written proposals to the secretary of the host association. FIFA then prints a list of suggestions that are distributed to all other associations for examination. The AGM is held either in February or March and the ABM is held between September and October. In cases of necessity, the Board can meet in a Special Meeting in addition to the two ordinary annual meetings. As of December 2012, the last Special Meeting was hosted by FIFA in Zürich on 5 July 2012.

The decisions of each year's Annual General Meeting of the Board regarding changes to the Laws of the Game enter into force from 1 July (and are binding on FIFA and on the other members of the Board, and, given that FIFA's Statutes establish that FIFA and its member associations and affiliates adhere to the Laws of the Game laid down by IFAB, those changes bind also FIFA's other member associations, FIFA's continental confederations of member associations, and the subnational entities of the national associations) but confederations, member associations and other bodies whose current season has not ended by 1 July may delay the introduction of the adopted alterations to the Laws of the Game in their competitions until the beginning of their next season. As well as permanent changes to the Laws, IFAB also authorises trials of potential amendments.

== Panels and Subcommittees ==
=== Advisory Panel ===
- Mercy Akide: FIFA
- Daniel Amokachi: CAF
- Zvonimir Boban: UEFA
- Kay Cossington: IFAB
- Diederik Dewaele: ECA
- Todd Durbin: WLF
- Jill Ellis: FIFA
- Carlos Enrique Fernández Cruz: CONCACAF
- Luís Figo: UEFA
- Cheryl Foster: IFAB
- Aaron Hughes: IFA
- Mehdi Mahdavikia: AFC
- Pedro Martínez Losa: SFA
- Francisco Maturana: CONMEBOL
- Hidetoshi Nakata: AFC
- Geremi Njitap: FIFPRO
- Nery Pumpido: CONMEBOL
- Jamaal Shabazz: CONCACAF
- Ivan Vicelich: OFC
- Arsène Wenger: FIFA
- Lydia Williams: FIFA

=== Technical Panel ===
- Enrique Cáceres: CONMEBOL
- Noumandiez Doué: CAF
- Shamsul Maidin: AFC
- Nicola Rizzoli: CONCACAF
- Roberto Rosetti: UEFA
- Kevin Stoltenkamp: OFC

=== Technical Subcommittee ===
- Crawford Allan: SFA
- Massimo Busacca: FIFA
- William Campbell: IFA
- Pierluigi Collina: FIFA
- David Elleray: IFAB
- Lee Evans: FAW

== List of IFAB Annual General Meetings ==
Year	Date	Host	Location	Venue	FA	SFA	FAW	IFA	FIFA	Required to amend laws	Notes / references
1886	1 June	FA	(England) London	Football Association Offices, 51 Holborn Viaduct	2	2	2	2	0	100%	First meeting
1887	1 June	SFA	(Scotland) Glasgow	Scottish Football Association Offices, 6 Carlton Place	2	2	2	2	0	100%	First meeting to amend the Laws of the Game
1888	25 June	FAW	(Wales) Wrexham	Wynnstay Arms Hotel	2	2	2	2	0	100%	
1889	1 June	IFA	(Ireland) Belfast	Commercial Hotel	2	2	2	2	0	100%	
1890	2 June	FA	(England) London	Anderton's Hotel	2	2	2	2	0	100%	
1891	2 June	SFA	(Scotland) Glasgow	Alexandra Hotel	2	2	2	2	0	100%	
1892	13 June	FAW	(Wales) Llandudno	Prince of Wales Hotel	2	2	2	2	0	100%	
1893	10 June	IFA	(Ireland) Belfast	Hotel Shaftesbury	2	2	2	2	0	100%	Date of subsequent meetings fixed to be the third Monday in June.
1894	18 June	FA	(England) Windermere	Ferry Hotel	2	2	2	2	0	100%	
1895	17 June	SFA	(Scotland) Glasgow	Alexandra Hotel	2	2	2	2	0	100%	
1896	15 June	FAW	(Wales) Aberystwyth	White Horse Hotel	2	2	2	2	0	100%	
1897	14 June	IFA	(Ireland) Rostrevor, Newry	Mourne Hotel	2	2	2	2	0	100%	
1898	20 June	FA	(England) London	Football Association Offices, 61 Chancery Lane	2	2	2	2	0	100%	
1899	19 June	SFA	(Scotland) Glasgow	St. Enoch's Station Hotel	2	2	2	2	0	100%	
1900	18 June	FAW	(Wales) Llangollen	Royal Hotel	2	2	2	2	0	100%	
1901	17 June	IFA	(Ireland) Giant's Causeway, Bushmills		2	2	2	2	0	100%	
1902	16 June	FA	(England) Scarborough	Grand Hotel	2	2	2	2	0	100%	
1903	15 June	SFA	(Scotland) Ayr	Station Hotel	2	2	2	2	0	100%	Date of subsequent meetings moved to the second Saturday in June.
1904	11 June	FAW	(Wales) Bangor	British Hotel	2	2	2	2	0	100%	
1905	17 June	IFA	(Ireland) Killarney	Lake Hotel	2	2	2	2	0	100%	First meeting to be held outside today's United Kingdom.
1906	9 June	FA	(England) Bowness-on-Windermere	Royal Hotel	2	2	2	2	0	100%	
1907	8 June	SFA	(Scotland) Oban	Alexandra Hotel	2	2	2	2	0	100%	
1908	19–20 June	FAW	(Wales) Llandrindod Wells	Rock Hotel	2	2	2	2	0	100%	
1909	12 June	IFA	(Ireland) Bundoran	Great Northern Hotel	2	2	2	2	0	100%	
1910	11 June	FA	(England) Brighton	Royal York Hotel	2	2	2	2	0	100%	
1911	11 June	SFA	(Scotland) Turnberry, Ayrshire	Station Hotel	2	2	2	2	0	100%	
1912	8 June	FAW	(Wales) Aberystwyth	Queen's Hotel	2	2	2	2	0	100%	
1913	14 June	IFA	(Ireland) Portrush	Northern Counties Hotel	2	2	2	2	2	80%	First meeting to include FIFA
1914	13 June	FIFA	(France) Paris	Hotel Palais D'Orsay	2	2	2	2	2	80%	First meeting held outside Britain and Ireland. Last meeting before the First World War.
1920	12–14 June	FA	(England) Torquay	Torbay Hotel	2	2	2	2	0	100%	First meeting after the First World War. FIFA again excluded.
1921	11 June	SFA	(Scotland) Portpatrick	Portpatrick Hotel	2	2	2	2	0	100%	
1922	10 June	FAW	(Wales) Llandudno	Imperial Hotel	2	2	2	2	0	100%	
1923	9 June	IFA	(Northern Ireland) Giant's Causeway, Bushmills	Causeway Hotel	2	2	2	2	0	100%	Last meeting to exclude FIFA
1924	14 June	FA	(England) London	Football Association Offices, 42 Russell Square	2	2	2	2	2	80%	
1925	13 June	FIFA	(France) Paris	11 Rue de Londres	2	2	2	2	2	80%	
1926	12 June	SFA	(Scotland) St Andrews	Grand Hotel	2	2	2	2	2	80%	
1927	11 June	FAW	(Wales) Llandudno	Grand Hotel	2	2	2	2	2	80%	
1928	9 June	IFA	(Northern Ireland) Newcastle	Slieve Donard Hotel	2	2	2	2	2	80%	
1929	8 June	FIFA	(France) Paris	Fédération Française de Football Association Offices, 22 Rue de Londres	2	2	2	2	2	80%	
1930	14 June	FA	(England) Bournemouth	Royal Exeter Hotel	2	2	2	2	2	80%	
1931	13 June	SFA	(Scotland) Auchterarder	Gleneagles Hotel	2	2	2	2	2	80%	
1932	11 June	FAW	(Wales) Llandudno	Imperial Hotel	2	2	2	2	2	80%	
1933	10 June	IFA	(Northern Ireland) Portrush	Northern Counties Hotel	2	2	2	2	2	80%	Rules amended to allow FIFA-hosted meetings to take place in "the territory of a Continental National Association", rather than being restricted to Paris.
1934	9 June	FIFA	(France) Cannes	Hôtel des Anglais	2	2	2	2	2	80%	
1935	8 June	FA	(England) Shanklin	Daish's Hotel	2	2	2	2	2	80%	
1936	13 June	SFA	(Scotland) Troon	Marine Hotel	2	2	2	2	2	80%	
1937	12 June	FAW	(Wales) Llandudno	Imperial Hotel	2	2	2	2	2	80%	
1938	11 & 13 June	IFA	(Northern Ireland) Portrush	Northern Counties Hotel	2	2	2	2	2	80%	
1939	10 June	FIFA	(France) Nice	Hotel Negresco	2	2	2	2	2	80%	Last meeting held before World War II. A meeting was scheduled for London in 1940, but was abandoned when FIFA and IFA delegates were unable to attend.
1947	14 June	FA	(England) Torquay	Imperial Hotel	2	2	2	2	2	80%	First meeting held after World War II.
1948	12 June	FIFA	(Switzerland) Montreux	Palace Hotel	2	2	2	2	2	80%	First meeting held outside Britain, Ireland and France. Meeting would have regularly been hosted by the SFA, but it was unanimously agreed to accept an invitation from FIFA to host this meeting.
1949	11 June	SFA	(Scotland) Pitlochry	Hydro Hotel	2	2	2	2	2	80%	
1950	10 June	FAW	(Wales) Beaumaris	Bulkeley Arms Hotel	2	2	2	2	2	80%	
1951	9 June	IFA	(Northern Ireland) Portrush	Northern Counties Hotel	2	2	2	2	2	80%	
1952	14 June	FIFA	(Italy) Capri	Morgano-Tiberio Hotel	2	2	2	2	2	80%	Date of future meetings moved to third Saturday in June.
1953	20 June	FA	(England) Eastbourne	Cavendish Hotel	2	2	2	2	2	80%	
1954	19 June	FIFA	(Switzerland) Bern	Schweizerhof Hotel	2	2	2	2	2	80%	The SFA agreed to forego its regularly scheduled hosting duties in order to allow FIFA to host the meeting at its 50th anniversary celebrations preceding the 1954 World Cup.
1955	18 June	SFA	(Scotland) North Berwick	Marine Hotel	2	2	2	2	2	80%	
1956	16 June	FAW	(Wales) Llandudno	Imperial Hotel	2	2	2	2	2	80%	
1957	15 June	IFA	(Northern Ireland) Portrush	Northern Counties Hotel	2	2	2	2	2	80%	
1958	7 June	FIFA	(Sweden) Stockholm	Hotel Foresta	1	1	1	1	4	75%	Meeting held on the day before the opening of the 1958 World Cup. New rules adopted, with greater voting weight given to FIFA "on behalf of all other National Associations in membership with it". Hosting rules changed to provide that "when the FIFA Congress and the World Cup coincide", FIFA should host the meeting at the World Cup venue, if practicable. Date of meeting may be any time in June.
1959	20 June	FA	St. Helier, Jersey	Pomme d'Or Hotel	1	1	1	1	4	75%	First of four consecutive meetings hosted by the FA outside England in the Channel Islands
1960	18 June	SFA	(Scotland) St Andrews	Rusack's Marine Hotel	1	1	1	1	4	75%	
1961	17 June	FAW	(Wales) Porthcawl	Seabank Hotel	1	1	1	1	4	75%	
1962	23 June	IFA	(Northern Ireland) Newcastle	Slieve Donard Hotel	1	1	1	1	4	75%	
1963	15 June	FIFA	(Italy) Venice	Palazzo della Camera di Commercio	1	1	1	1	4	75%	
1964	20 June	FA	St. Helier, Jersey	Grand Hotel	1	1	1	1	4	75%	
1965	19 June	SFA	(Scotland) Edinburgh	Caledonian Hotel	1	1	1	1	4	75%	
1966	11 June	FAW	(Wales) Llandudno	Marine Hotel	1	1	1	1	4	75%	
1967	17 June	IFA	(Northern Ireland) Newcastle	Slieve Donard Hotel	1	1	1	1	4	75%	Last meeting hosted by the IFA for 13 years. The IFA withdrew from its regular hosting schedule during the 1970s owing to the "Troubles" in Northern Ireland.
1968	15 June	FIFA	(Socialist Federal Republic of Yugoslavia) Dubrovnik	Hotel Excelsior	1	1	1	1	4	75%	
1969	21 June	FA	St. Helier, Jersey	Grand Hotel	1	1	1	1	4	75%	
1970	27 June	SFA	(Scotland) Inverness	Caledonian Hotel	1	1	1	1	4	75%	
1971	19 June	FAW	(Wales) Swansea	Dragon Hotel	1	1	1	1	4	75%	
1972	10 June	FIFA	(Austria) Vienna	Parkhotel Schönbrunn	1	1	1	1	4	75%	FIFA stepped in to replace the IFA.
1973	23 June	FA	St Peter Port, Guernsey	Duke of Richmond Hotel	1	1	1	1	4	75%	
1974	9 July	FIFA	(West Germany) Rottach-Egern	Hotel Bachmair	1	1	1	1	4	75%	Meeting held two days after the final of the 1974 World Cup in nearby Munich. First meeting not held in June.
1975	21 June	SFA	(Scotland) Auchterarder	Gleneagles Hotel	1	1	1	1	4	75%	
1976	18 June	FAW	(Wales) Porthcawl	Seabank Hotel	1	1	1	1	4	75%	
1977	19 June	FA	(England) London	Royal Garden Hotel	1	1	1	1	4	75%	The IFA withdrew from hosting this meeting.
1978	1 June	FIFA	(Argentina) Buenos Aires	Hotel Sheraton	1	1	1	1	4	75%	First meeting outside Europe. Held on the opening day of the 1978 World Cup.
1979	16 June	SFA	(Scotland) Auchterarder	Gleneagles Hotel	1	1	1	1	4	75%	
1980	7 June	IFA	(Northern Ireland) Craigavad, Holywood	Culloden Hotel	1	1	1	1	4	75%	
1981	13 June	FAW	(Wales) Ruthin	Ruthin Castle	1	1	1	1	4	75%	IFAB had accepted an invitation by FIFA President João Havelange to host this meeting in Brazil, but the invitation was subsequently withdrawn, with Havelange missing this meeting for personal reasons.
1982	6 July	FIFA	(Spain) Madrid	Palacio de Congresos	1	1	1	1	4	75%	Meeting held the day after the final of the 1982 World Cup
1983	9 July	FA	(England) New Milton	Chewton Glen Hotel	1	1	1	1	4	75%	
1984	2 June	SFA	(Scotland) Turnberry, Ayrshire	Turnberry Hotel	1	1	1	1	4	75%	
1985	15 June	IFA	(Northern Ireland) Craigavad, Holywood	Culloden Hotel	1	1	1	1	4	75%	
1986	30 May	FIFA	Mexico City	Camino Real Hotel	1	1	1	1	4	75%	First (and, as of 2020, only) meeting in North America. Originally scheduled to be held in Zürich, but moved to Mexico in connection with the 1986 World Cup.
1987	13 June	FAW	(Wales) Llandudno	Bodysgallen Hall	1	1	1	1	4	75%	
1988	4 June	FA	(England) London	Royal Lancaster Hotel	1	1	1	1	4	75%	
1989	7 June	SFA	(Scotland) Edinburgh	Caledonian Hotel	1	1	1	1	4	75%	
1990	28 June	FIFA	(Italy) Rome	Hilton Cavalieri Hotel	1	1	1	1	4	75%	Held during the 1990 World Cup
1991	8 June	IFA	(Northern Ireland) Craigavad, Holywood	Culloden Hotel	1	1	1	1	4	75%	
1992	30 May	FAW	(Wales) Usk Valley, Newport	Celtic Manor Hotel	1	1	1	1	4	75%	New rules adopted by IFAB: in future years there will be two annual meetings: the Annual General Meeting, held in February / March, and the Annual Business Meeting in September / October.
1993	27 February	FA	(England) Thundridge, Hertfordshire	Hanbury Manor	1	1	1	1	4	75%	
1994	5 March	FIFA	(Switzerland) Zürich	FIFA House	1	1	1	1	4	75%	
1995	4 March	SFA	(Scotland) Turnberry, Ayrshire	Turnberry Hotel	1	1	1	1	4	75%	
1996	9 March	FIFA	(Brazil) Rio de Janeiro	Copacabana Palace Hotel	1	1	1	1	4	75%	Last meeting held outside Europe (as of 2020). Originally scheduled to be hosted by the IFA in Northern Ireland, but moved to Brazil at the instigation of outgoing FIFA President João Havelange.
1997	1 March	IFA	(Northern Ireland) Craigavad, Holywood	Culloden Hotel	1	1	1	1	4	75%	
1998	6 March	FIFA	(France) Paris	Hôtel Plaza Athénée	1	1	1	1	4	75%	
1999	20 February	FAW	(Wales) Groes-faen, Vale of Glamorgan	Miskin Manor Hotel	1	1	1	1	4	75%	
2000	19 February	FA	(England) Taplow, Berkshire	Cliveden	1	1	1	1	4	75%	
2001	10 March	SFA	(Scotland) Edinburgh	Balmoral Hotel	1	1	1	1	4	75%	
2002	16 March	FIFA	(Switzerland) Zermatt	Hôtel Mont Cervin	1	1	1	1	4	75%	
2003	15 March	IFA	(Northern Ireland) Craigavad, Holywood	Culloden Hotel	1	1	1	1	4	75%	
2004	28 February	FIFA	(England) London	Claridge's Hotel	1	1	1	1	4	75%	Hosted in London by FIFA as part of its centenary celebrations, to celebrate the role of the four Home Associations in the development of the game.
2005	26 February	FAW	(Wales) Groes-faen, Vale of Glamorgan	Miskin Manor Hotel	1	1	1	1	4	75%	
2006	4 March	FIFA	(Switzerland) Lucerne	Palace Hotel	1	1	1	1	4	75%	120th anniversary.
2007	3 March	FA	(England) Manchester	Lowry Hotel	1	1	1	1	4	75%	
2008	8 March	SFA	(Scotland) Auchterarder	Gleneagles Hotel	1	1	1	1	4	75%	
2009	28 February	IFA	(Northern Ireland) Newcastle	Slieve Donard Hotel	1	1	1	1	4	75%	
2010	6 March	FIFA	(Switzerland) Zürich	FIFA headquarters	1	1	1	1	4	75%	
2011	5 March	FAW	(Wales) Usk Valley, Newport	Celtic Manor Hotel	1	1	1	1	4	75%	
2012	3 March	FA	(England) Bagshot, Surrey	Pennyhill Park Hotel	1	1	1	1	4	75%	
2013	2 March	SFA	(Scotland) Edinburgh	Balmoral Hotel	1	1	1	1	4	75%	
2014	1 March	FIFA	(Switzerland) Zürich	FIFA headquarters	1	1	1	1	4	75%	
2015	27 February–1 March	IFA	(Northern Ireland) Craigavad, Holywood	Culloden Hotel	1	1	1	1	4	75%	
2016	5 March	FAW	(Wales) Cardiff	St. David's Hotel and Spa	1	1	1	1	4	75%	130th Anniversary.
2017	3 March	FA	(England) Wembley, London	Wembley Stadium	1	1	1	1	4	75%	
2018	3 March	FIFA	(Switzerland) Zürich	FIFA headquarters	1	1	1	1	4	75%	
2019	2 March	SFA	(Scotland) Aberdeen	Marcliffe Hotel	1	1	1	1	4	75%	
2020	29 February	IFA	(Northern Ireland) Craigavad, Holywood	Culloden Hotel	1	1	1	1	4	75%	
2021	5 March	FAW	Meeting held by videoconference	N/A	1	1	1	1	4	75%	
2022	25 March	FIFA	Meeting held by videoconference	N/A	1	1	1	1	4	75%	
2023	4 March	FA	(England) London	Wembley Stadium	1	1	1	1	4	75%	
2024	2 March	SFA	(Scotland) Loch Lomond	Cameron House	1	1	1	1	4	75%	
2025	1 March	IFA	(Northern Ireland) Craigavad, Holywood	Culloden Hotel	1	1	1	1	4	75%	
2026	28 February	FAW	(Wales) Hensol	Hensol Castle	1	1	1	1	4	75%	

== See also ==
- Laws of the Game (association football)
- Laws of rugby league
