= Mandarin Oriental Palace, Luzern =

Hotel in Lucerne, Switzerland

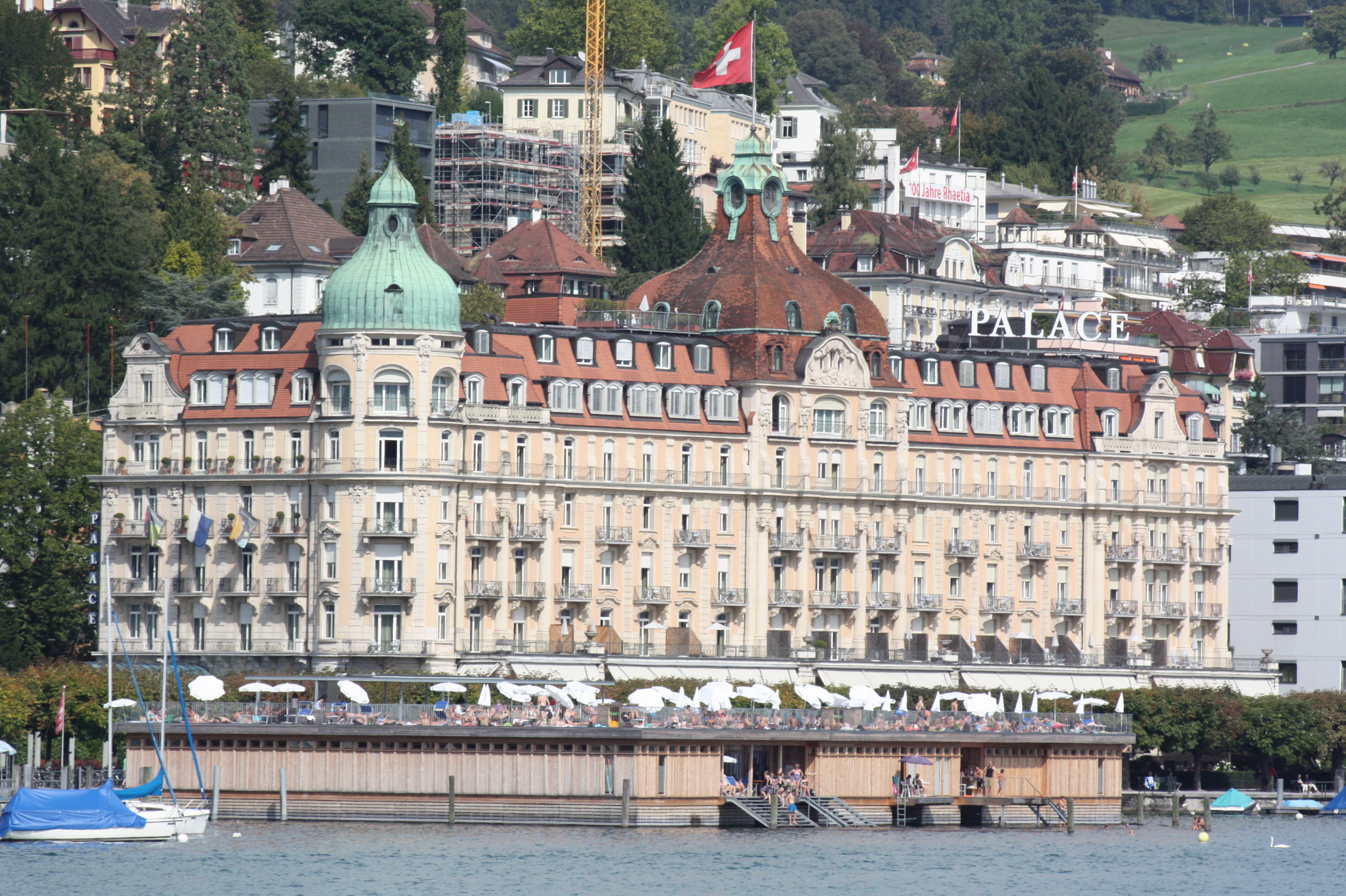
- Mandarin Oriental Palace, Luzern, viewed from the lake 2011
- Interactive map of the Mandarin Oriental Palace, Luzern area

General information
- Location: Lucerne, Switzerland
- Coordinates: 47°3′19″N 8°19′11″E
- Opening: 7 May 1906
- Operator: Mandarin Oriental Hotel Group

Technical details
- Floor count: 6

Design and construction
- Architect: Heinrich Meili-Wapf (firm)
- Developer: Franz Josef Bucher

Other information
- Number of rooms: 136
- Number of suites: 45

Website
- Official site

The Mandarin Oriental Palace, Luzern is a grand hotel of the Belle Époque, located on the north shore of the lake on "National Quai" ("Nationalquai") in Lucerne, Switzerland. It was built as the Palace Hotel Luzern between 1904 and 1906, and is officially designated as a cultural asset of national importance (Conservation Grade B).

== History ==
In 1903 Franz Josef Bucher, a farmer's son, who by this time had become well established as a hotel pioneer-entrepreneur, purchased a 3,285 square metre plot of land at one end of the "National Quai" ("Nationalquai") in Lucerne for a price of 880,000 Swiss francs. The price equated to 270 Swiss Francs square metre which at that time was "sensationally" expensive for a 3,000 square metre building plot. Construction began in July 1904, to designs by architect Heinrich Meili-Wapf, and less than two years later, on 7 May 1906, the Palace Hotel Luzern opened. The hotel cost a "sensational" four million Swiss francs. All the south-facing rooms with a lake view, as well as all the east-facing rooms, came with an en suite bathroom, which was considered the height of luxury. The Palace Hotel Luzern was also unusually large, with a total of 120 private bathrooms shared between 350 beds. That made it substantially larger than the city's existing grand hotels: The National had 79 private bathrooms shared between 450 beds, while the Schweizerhof made do with only 70 private bathrooms shared between 400 beds. The Palace Hotel Luzern was considered one of the most elegant hotels in the world.

Bookings during the first summer season were strong, apparently justifying the massive investment. However, Bucher's determination to make the Palace Luzern the city's number one hotel came with a considerable additional cost, which he may not have anticipated, in the form of the envy of Lucerne's existing top hoteliers. Wealthy tourists staying in Luzern as part of a tour would frequently ask the reception staff to book their next hotels, and the competitor hoteliers in Luzern reacted with an effective bookings boycott of Bucher's other hotels in destinations such as Lugano, Milan, Genoa and Rome.

After the outbreak of the First World War the hotel had to be closed, but business resumed following the signing of the Treaty of Versailles, and business boomed through most of the 1920s. At the end of the decade bookings nevertheless dropped off in the aftermath of the Wall Street crash, and debt financing accordingly became more burdensome for the business. By the time the Second World War broke out in 1939 the Palace Hotel Luzern was the only significant hotel still held in Franz Josef Bucher's once extensive "Schweizerische Hotelgesellschaft AG" hotels portfolio. During the Second World War the hotel became a medical centre: it was also used as a storage location for essential basic supplies. After a two-year renovation programme costing 1.5 Million Swiss francs the hotel reopened in 1946, returned to its former luxury.

Since the 1970s the hotel has undergone a succession of changes and upgrades, and adapted for year-round operation. During the winter of 1993/94 the top two floors were rebuilt at a cost of 15 Million Swiss francs, yielding an additional 48 rooms and suites. In October 1997 the Palace Hotel Luzern, by now under the control of General Director Jürg Reinshagen and his brother Ernst was taken over by the hotel specialists Victoria-Jungfrau Collection AG, owners of the Victoria-Jungfrau Grand Hotel & Spa in Interlaken. By this time the two five star hotels had already been collaborating closely for some years and the take-over was reportedly a "friendly" one.

In 2011, following the currency realignments triggered by the world economic crisis of 2007/09, Swiss hotels came under financial pressure, in common with other export dependent labour-intensive sectors, and in 2011 the owners sold the Hotel Palace Luzern building to "CS Funds AG", an investment fund belonging to Credit Suisse, in a "sale and leaseback" deal. In October 2015 it became known that the bank was looking to sell the building. The hotel closed for renovations in 2019 and reopened as Mandarin Oriental Palace, Luzern on September 24, 2022.
