= Stansstad =

- Municipality
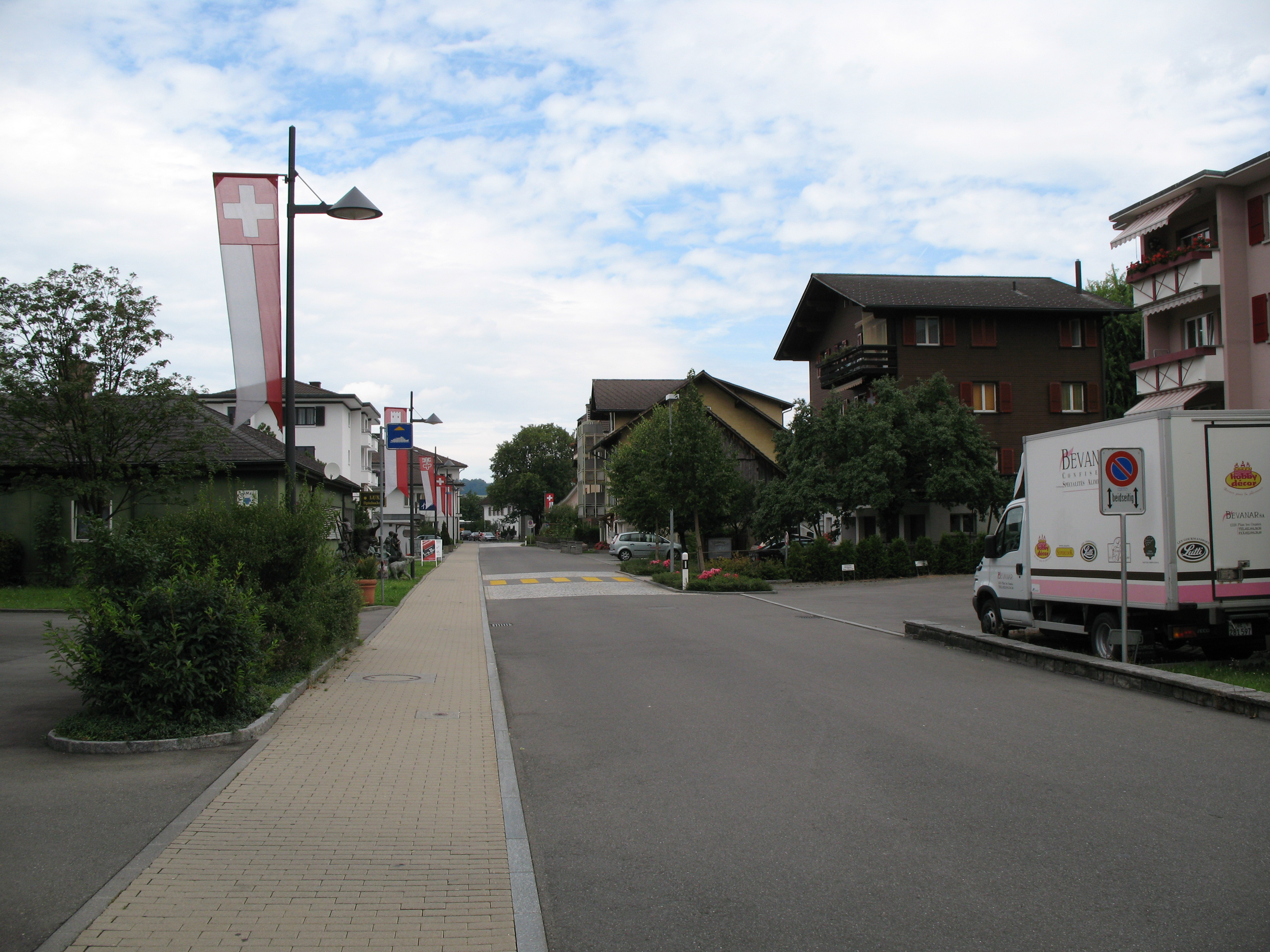

- Flag Coat of arms
- Location of Stansstad
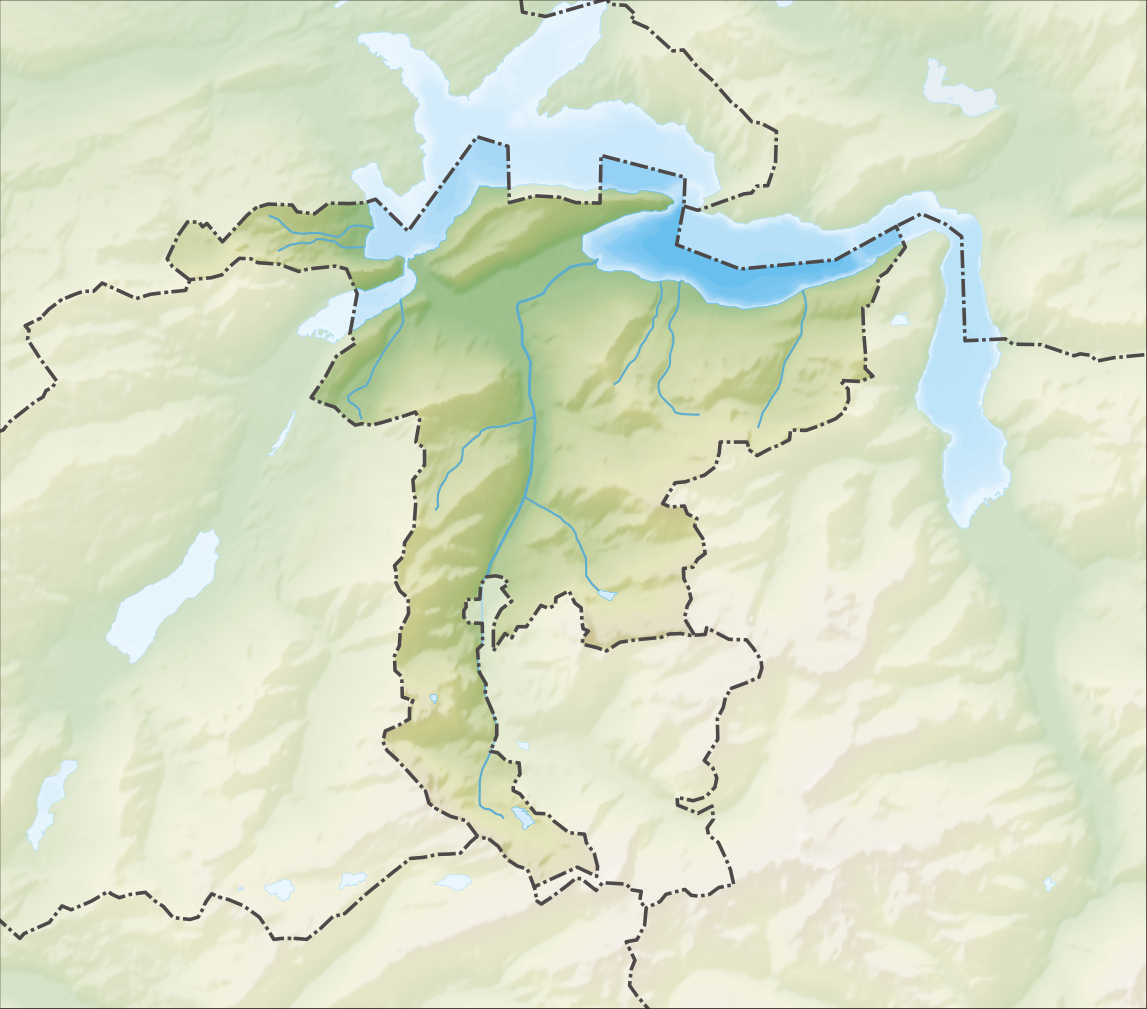
- Location within Switzerland Location within Canton of Nidwalden
- Coordinates: 46°58.602′N 8°20.403′E
- Country: Switzerland
- Canton: Nidwalden
- District: n.a.

Area
  - Total: 17.11 km^{2} (6.61 sq mi)
- Elevation: 436 m (1,430 ft)

Population (Dec 2015)
  - Total: 4,396
  - Density: 256.9/km^{2} (665.4/sq mi)
- Time zone: UTC+01:00 (CET)
  - Summer (DST): UTC+02:00 (CEST)
- Postal code: 6362
- SFOS number: 1510
- ISO 3166 code: CH-NW
- Surrounded by: Alpnach (OW), Ennetbürgen, Ennetmoos, Hergiswil, Horw (LU), Meggen (LU), Stans, Weggis (LU)
- Website: www.stansstad.ch

Stansstad is a municipality in the canton of Nidwalden in Switzerland.

== Geography ==
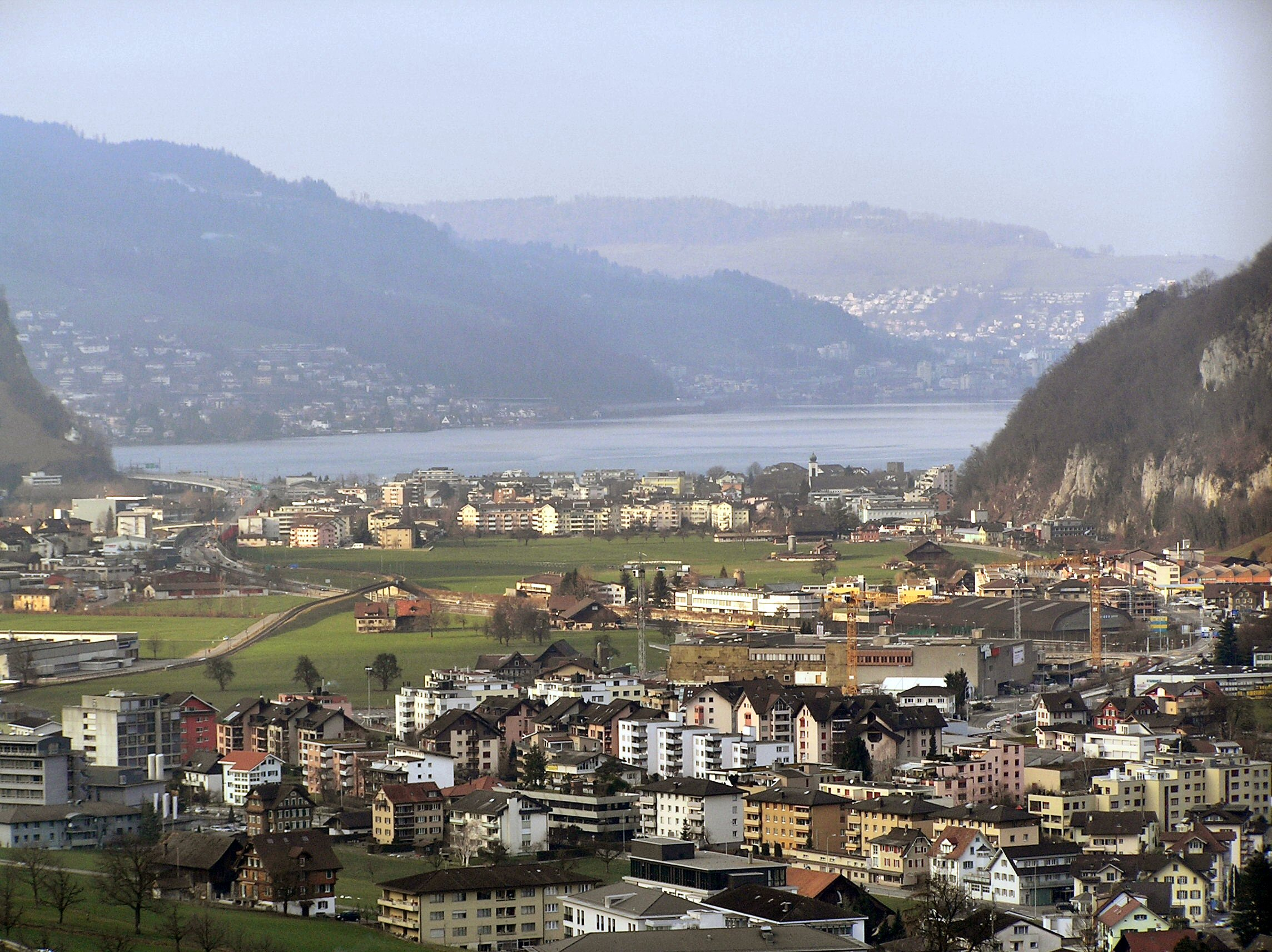
Stansstad and Lake Lucerne

Aerial view by Walter Mittelholzer (1919)

Stansstad has an area, (as of the 2004/09 survey) of 9.07 km^{2} (3.50 sq mi). Of this area, about 32.6% is used for agricultural purposes, while 49.6% is forested. Of the rest of the land, 15.4% is settled (buildings or roads) and 2.4% is unproductive land. In the 2004/09 survey a total of 80 ha (200 acres) or about 8.8% of the total area was covered with buildings, an increase of 15 ha (37 acres) over the 1981/82 amount. Over the same time period, the amount of recreational space in the municipality increased by 1 ha (2.5 acres) and is now about 0.99% of the total area. Of the agricultural land, 10 ha (25 acres) is used for orchards and vineyards and 307 ha (760 acres) is fields and grasslands. Since 1981/82 the amount of agricultural land has decreased by 24 ha (59 acres). Rivers and lakes cover 9 ha (22 acres) in the municipality.

== Demographics ==
Stansstad has a population (as of December 2020) of 4,727. As of 2014, 15.2% of the population are resident foreign nationals. In 2015 a small minority (234 or 5.3% of the population) was born in Germany. Over the last 4 years (2010-2014) the population has changed at a rate of -1.44%. The birth rate in the municipality, in 2014, was 9.1, while the death rate was 8.0 per thousand residents.

As of 2014, children and teenagers (0–19 years old) make up 14.1% of the population, while adults (20–64 years old) are 63.3% and seniors (over 64 years old) make up 22.6%. In 2015 there were 1,800 single residents, 1,950 people who were married or in a civil partnership, 222 widows or widowers and 424 divorced residents.

In 2014 there were 2,131 private households in Stansstad with an average household size of 2.03 persons. Of the 629 inhabited buildings in the municipality, in 2000, about 34.5% were single family homes and 39.6% were multiple family buildings. Additionally, about 13.7% of the buildings were built before 1919, while 14.8% were built between 1991 and 2000. In 2013 the rate of construction of new housing units per 1000 residents was 1.36. The vacancy rate for the municipality, in 2015, was 2.7%.

Most of the population (as of 2000) speaks German (90.1%), with Italian being second most common (2.1%) and Albanian being third (1.5%).

== Historical population ==
The historical population is given in the following chart:

== Politics ==
In the 2015 federal election the most popular party was the SVP with 83.8% of the vote, followed by local parties with the remaining 16.2%. In the federal election, a total of 1,805 votes were cast, and the voter turnout was 55.0%.

In the 2007 federal election the most popular party was the FDP which received 88.6% of the vote. Most of the rest of the votes were given to local, small right-wing parties (10.8%).

== Education ==
In Stansstad about 77.9% of the population (between age 25–64) have completed either non-mandatory upper secondary education or additional higher education (either university or a Fachhochschule).

== Economy ==
Stansstad is a high-income community. The municipality is part of the regional center of Stans.

As of 2014, there were a total of 2,163 people employed in the municipality. Of these, a total of 74 people worked in 26 businesses in the primary economic sector. The secondary sector employed 525 workers in 63 separate businesses. A minority (26.1%) of the secondary sector employees worked in very small businesses. There were 10 small businesses with a total of 198 employees and two mid sized businesses with a total of 190 employees. Finally, the tertiary sector provided 1,564 jobs in 355 businesses. There were 20 small businesses with a total of 495 employees and two mid sized businesses with a total of 222 employees.

In 2014 a total of 1.4% of the population received social assistance.

In 2015 local hotels had a total of 19,501 overnight stays, of which 51.8% were international visitors.

== Transport ==
Stansstad is served by Stansstad station on the Luzern–Stans–Engelberg line, on which the Lucerne S-Bahn S4 service provides two trains per hour. The village is also served by post bus services, including services to Bürgenstock, Stans and Büren, and by shipping services of the Schifffahrtsgesellschaft des Vierwaldstättersees on Lake Lucerne.

Fürigenbahn was a funicular that led from Harissenbucht to the hotel at Fürigen (1924-2005).

== Sights ==
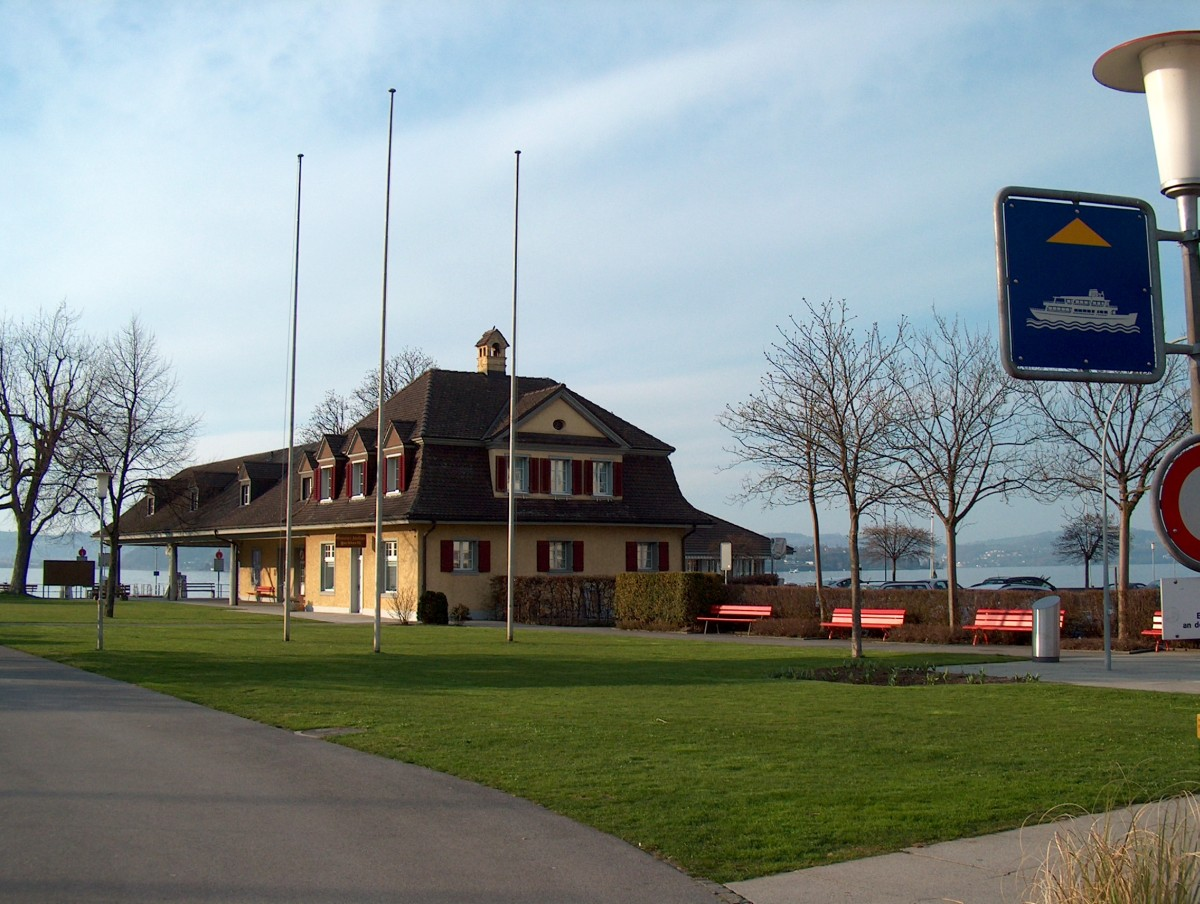
Stansstad waterfront

The main sights of Stansstad are a museum of the fortifications, a tower (Schnitzturm), and the chapel Marie Linden in Kehrsiten.

=== Heritage sites of national significance ===
The prehistoric lakeside settlement at Kehrsiten and the Teller/Palisaden and Schnitzturm, all part of the medieval fortifications are listed as Swiss heritage site of national significance. The prehistoric settlement is part of the Prehistoric Pile dwellings around the Alps a UNESCO World Heritage Site.
