= Hammetschwand Elevator =

Outdoor elevator in Switzerland

Coordinates: 47°00′04″N 8°23′47″E

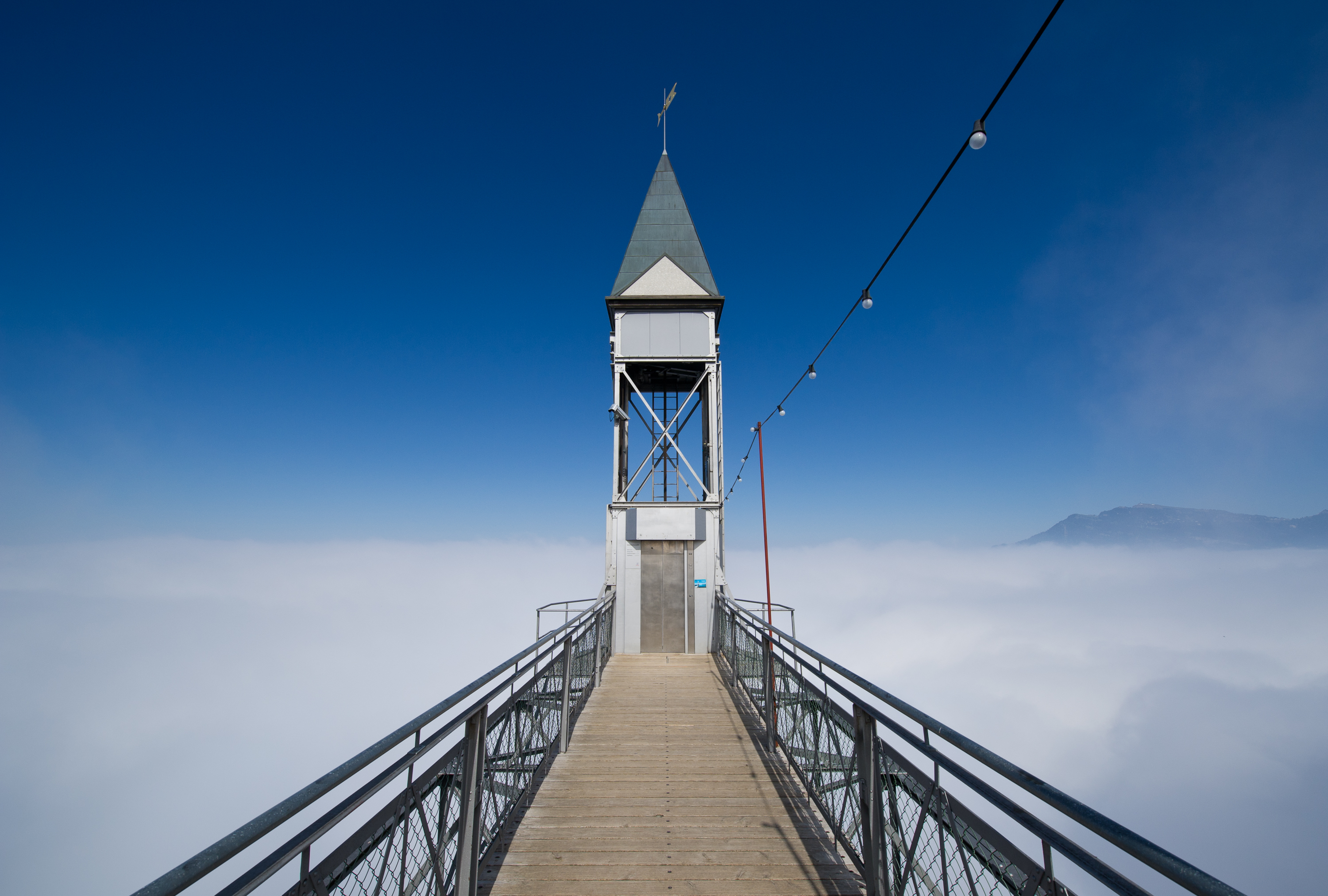
Hammetschwand's upper station

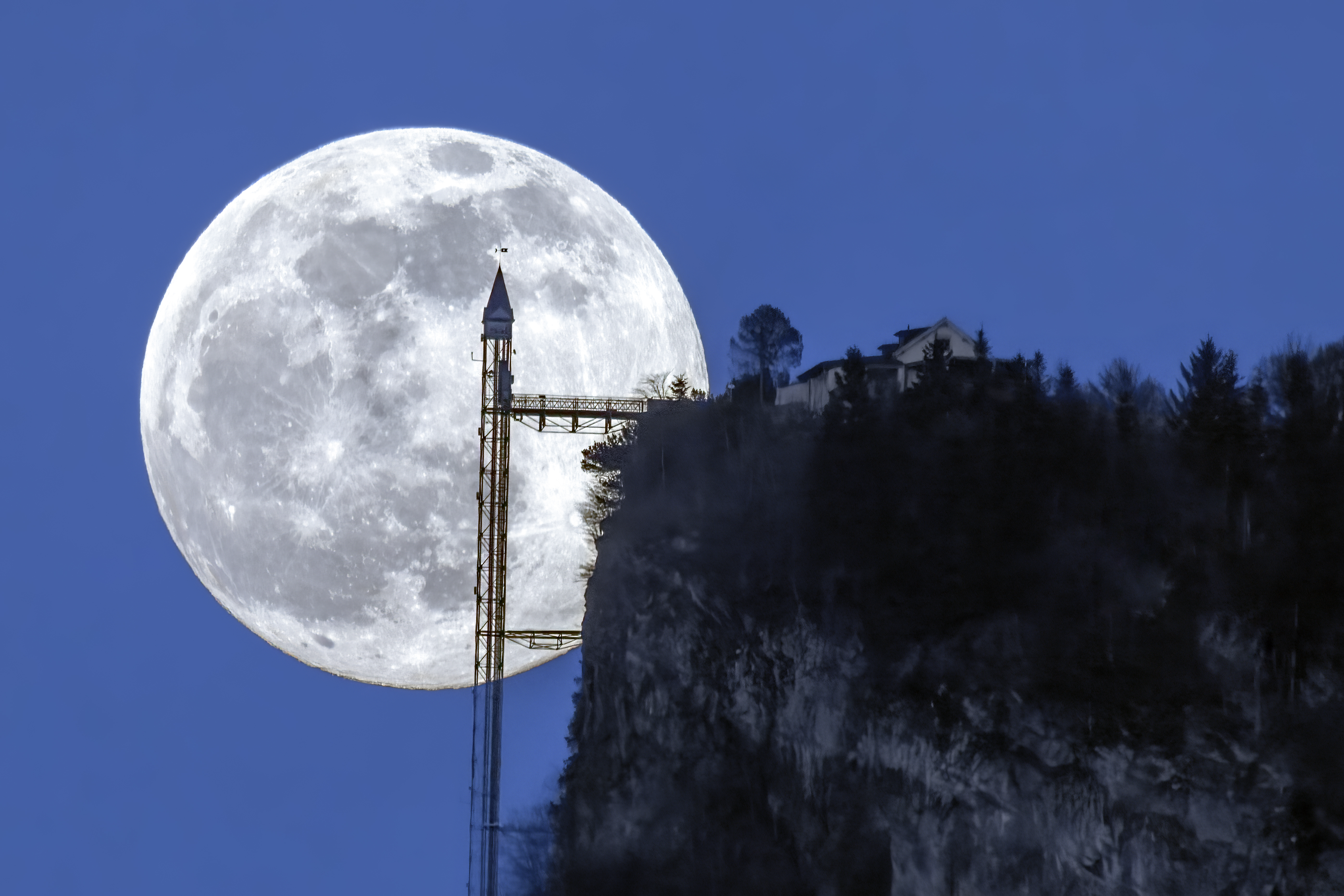
The elevator at night

The Hammetschwand Elevator, near Lake Lucerne, Switzerland, is the highest and fastest outdoor elevator in Europe. It connects a lower station built inside Bürgenstock, a mountain beside Lake Lucerne, with an upper station at Hammetschwand, the peak of the mountain, traveling a distance of 153 m (502 ft).

== History ==
Built by hotel and railway businessmen Franz Josef Bucher and Josef Durrer, who also constructed the nearby Bürgenstock Resort, it was the first of its type in Switzerland when first opened in 1905.

The original lift operated at a speed of 1 m/s (3.3 ft/s) and took nearly three minutes to reach the summit of the Hammetschwand, carrying up to eight people in its wooden and zinc-plated cab. In 1935, the lift's speed was increased to 2.7 m/s (8.9 ft/s) and the cab was replaced with a lighter metal construction.

The filigrain metal lattice tower has a surface area of 2 m × 2 m (6 ft 7 in × 6 ft 7 in), is 118 m (387 ft) high and is located on a 44 m (144 ft) high rock pit. The elevator entrance, the engine room and the first 14 m (46 ft) of the pit are within the mountain, while the next 30 m (98 ft) of the shaft extend into the open air, offering a view of Lake Lucerne. At the top station of Hammetschwand (1,132 m (3,714 ft) above sea level), there are panoramic views of the lake and the Alps.

The lift was refurbished in 1991–1992, and had its speed increased to 3.15 m/s (10.3 ft/s), now reaching the summit in under a minute. The current lift was built and opened by the Schindler Group.
