= Schnitzturm =

- Schnitzturm
- Stansstad, Nidwalden in Switzerland
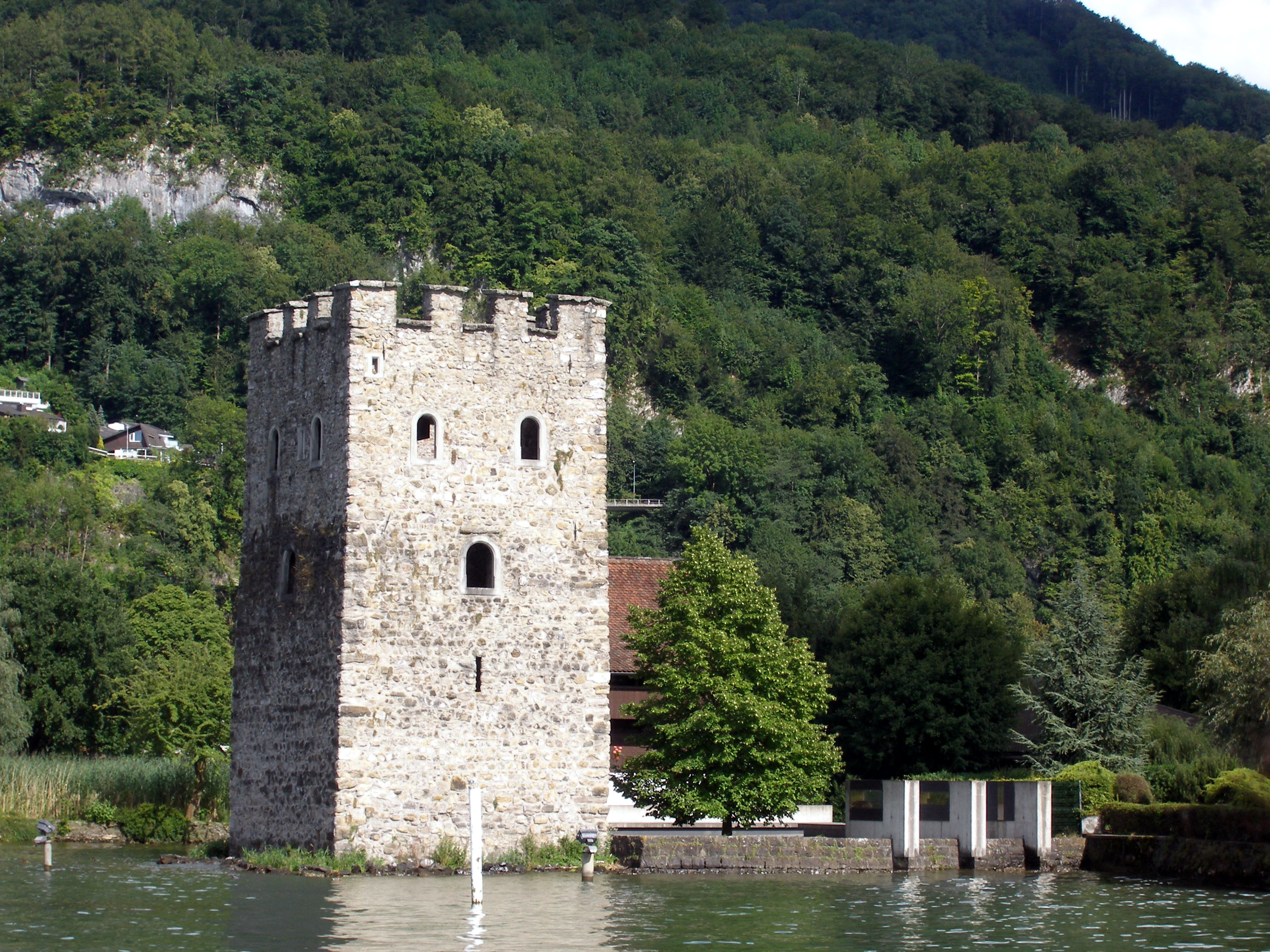

Location
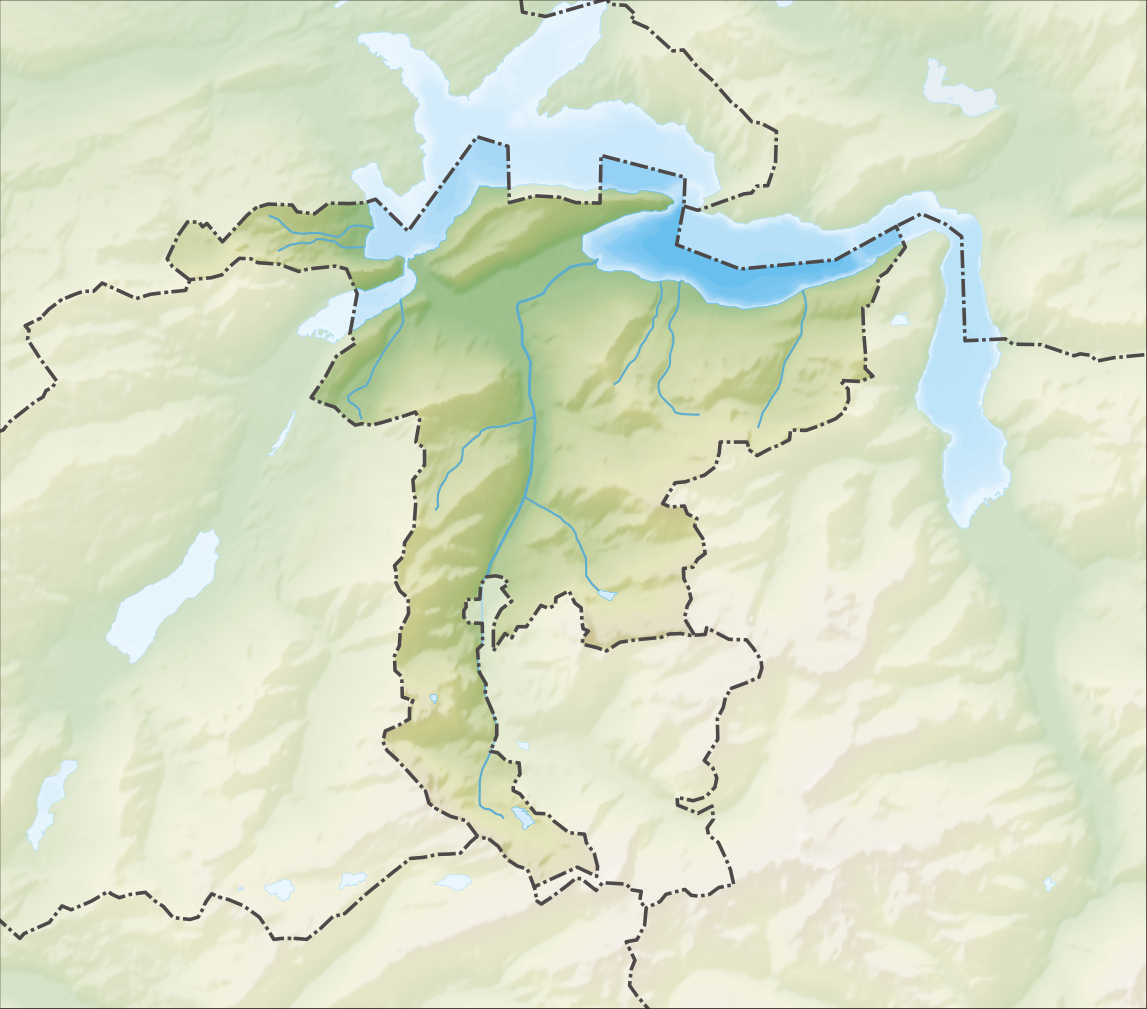
- Coordinates: 46°58′51″N 8°20′16″E

Site history
- Built: Early 14th century

The Schnitzturm is a stone tower in the municipality of Stansstad in the canton of Nidwalden in Switzerland. It is part of the Teller / Palisaden medieval fortifications which are a Swiss heritage site of national significance.

== History ==
The first fortification along the lake shore was the Teller, a wooden block building and wall built out in Lake Lucerne and dendrochronologically dated to 1206/07. In the late 13th or early 14th centuries the tower was built on an artificial spit which projected out into the lake as part of the defenses around Stansstad. In addition to the Schnitzturm, a defensive wall or palisade consisting of about 8,000 wooden pillars driven into the lake at a depth of about 2 m (6.6 ft). The palisade had a channel in it, known as the Grendel, to allow boats to enter the harbor. Exactly when the tower was first built is unknown, but it appears in a 1428 chronicle of the 1315 Battle of Morgarten. According to the chronicle, during an attack of Habsburg troops from Lucerne, an enemy ship was destroyed by a mill stone launched from the tower. Despite the efforts of the defenders, the attackers broke through and Stansstad was plundered. After the 1315 attack, the defenses were strengthened with earthen and stone walls and ditches along the shore.

The Schnitzturm and other defenses lost their importance after 1332 when Lucerne joined the Old Swiss Confederacy. The palisade was not repaired as the posts rotted away. After the division of Unterwalden into Obwalden and Nidwalden in the 1350s, both successor half-cantons were responsible for upkeep of the defenses at Stansstad. This arraignment proved to be problematic and by 1587 the tower had fallen into disrepair. In that year, a special Landsgemeinde decided to repair the tower. The project took about two years and completely renovated the tower. The round arch windows were added as was the current entrance on the south side at ground level. The original entrance on the second floor corner was closed off. A flat hipped roof was built on top of the tower.

The roof was damaged by lightning in 1634 and only partly repaired in the following year. The interior was soon destroyed by the leaky roof and the tower began to be used to dry fishing nets. It was repaired again by Obwalden in 1736. The last military use of the tower was during the 1798 French invasion. The palisade was hastily replaced with floating fir tree trunks and the Schnitzturm was manned. They held off the French fleet for several days, but on 9 April 1798 French troops broke through on the land side and captured the town. The town and the tower were burned by the victorious soldiers. In 1880 the cantonal authorities repaired the tower, built a staircase and observation platform and readded the crenelations that existed before the 1635 roof.

== Castle site ==
The grounds around the tower are open to the public year-round. From 1 May though 30 September the tower is open during daylight hours. The tower has a 8.8 m (29 ft) square footprint and is 16 m (52 ft) high. The walls are 1.4 m (4.6 ft) thick at the base.

== Gallery ==
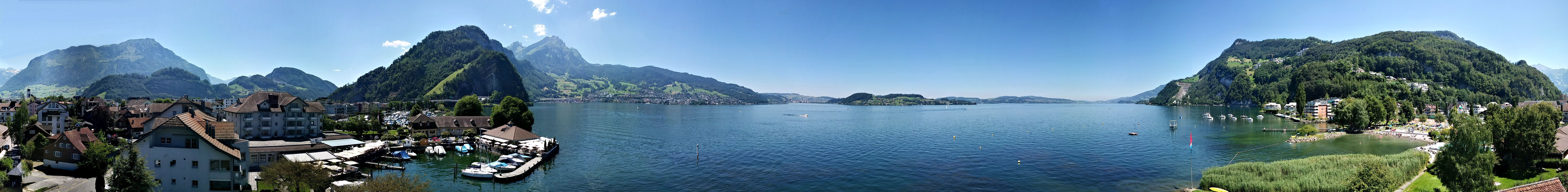
Panoramic view from the top of the tower
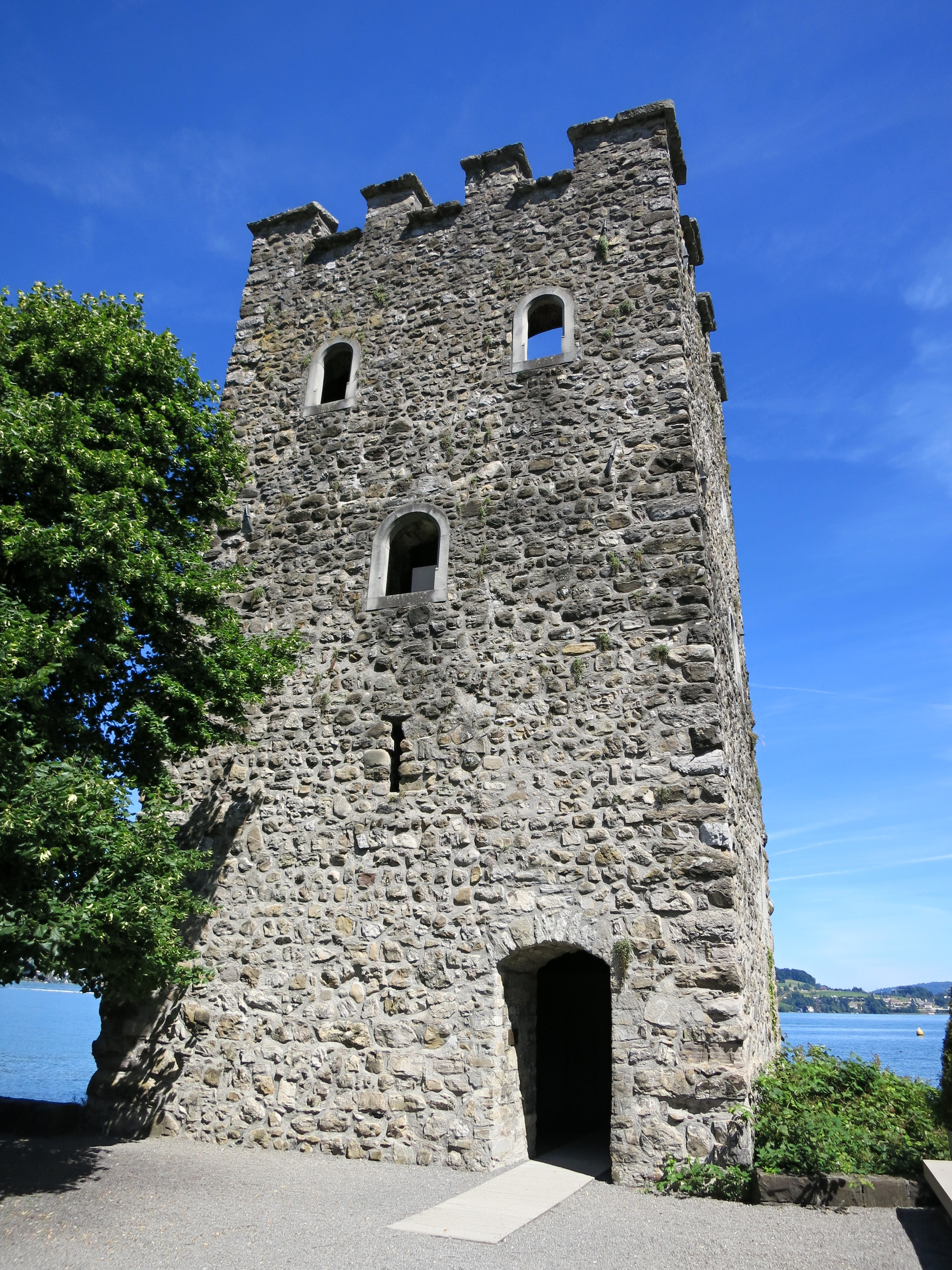
View of the Schnitzturm

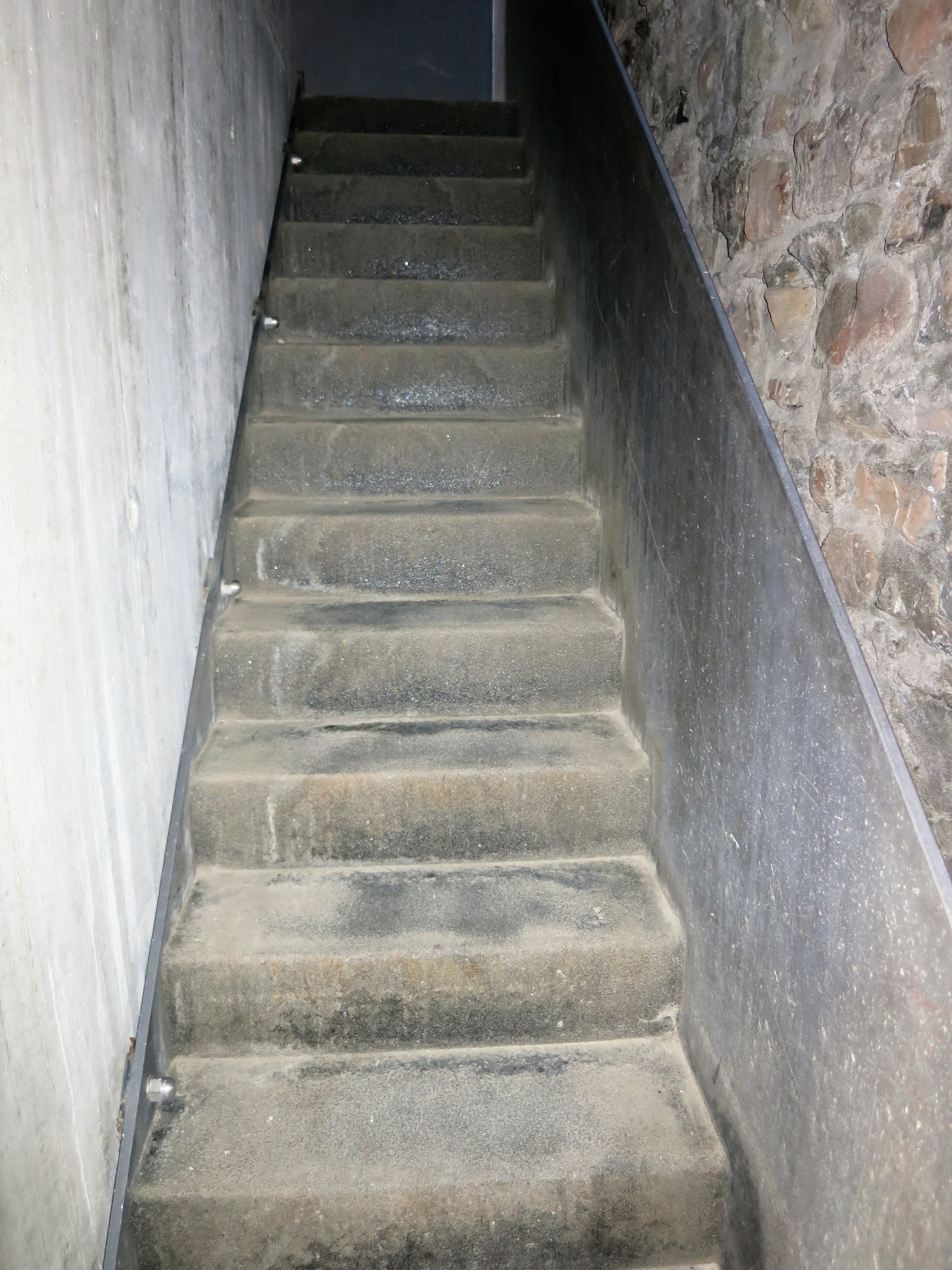
Stairs going up the tower

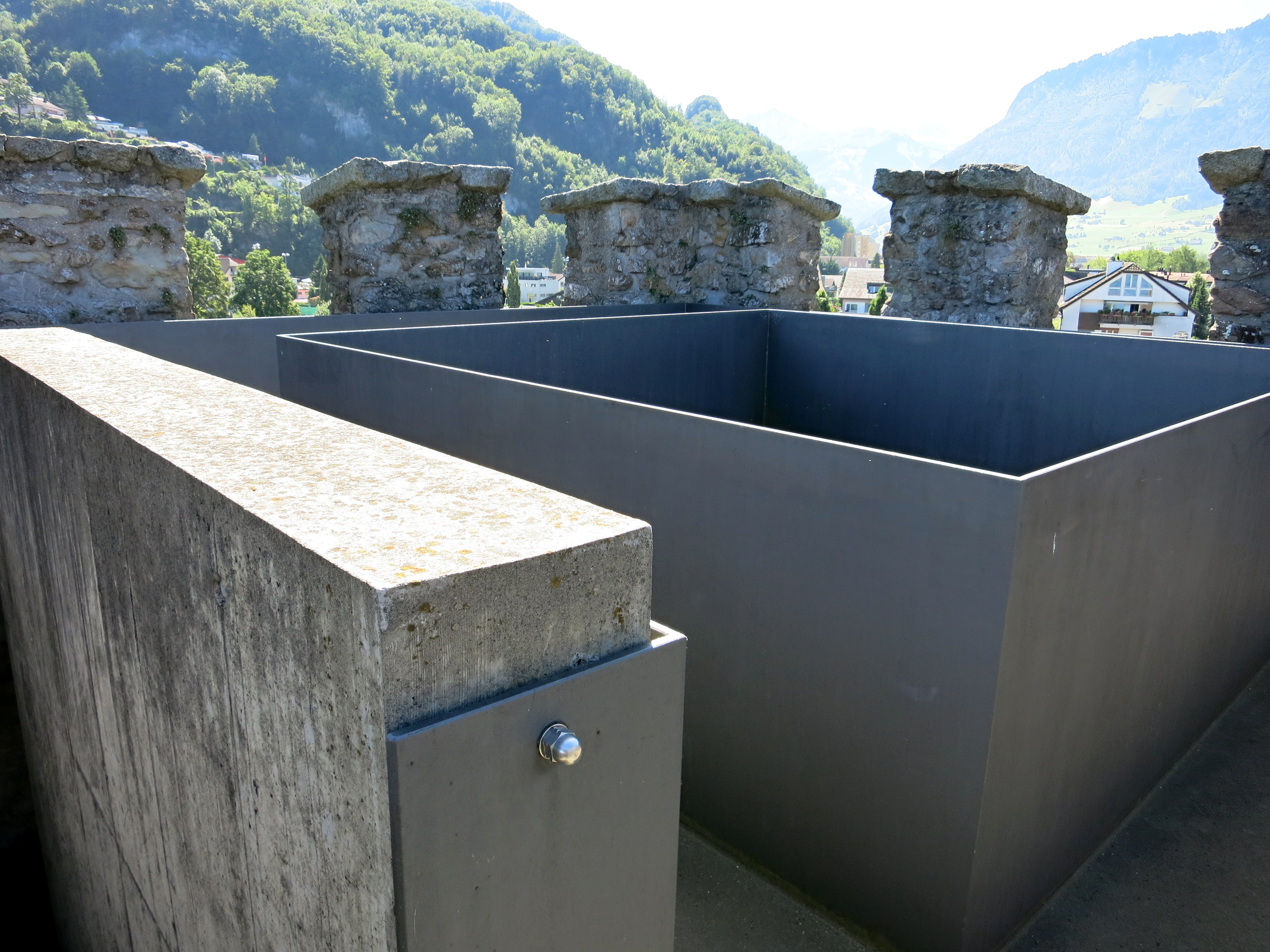
Viewing platform

== See also ==
- List of castles and fortresses in Switzerland
