= Bürgenstock Funicular =

Funicular railway at Lake Lucerne, Switzerland

Coordinates: 46.999471°N 8.381667°E

Bürgenstock-Bahn
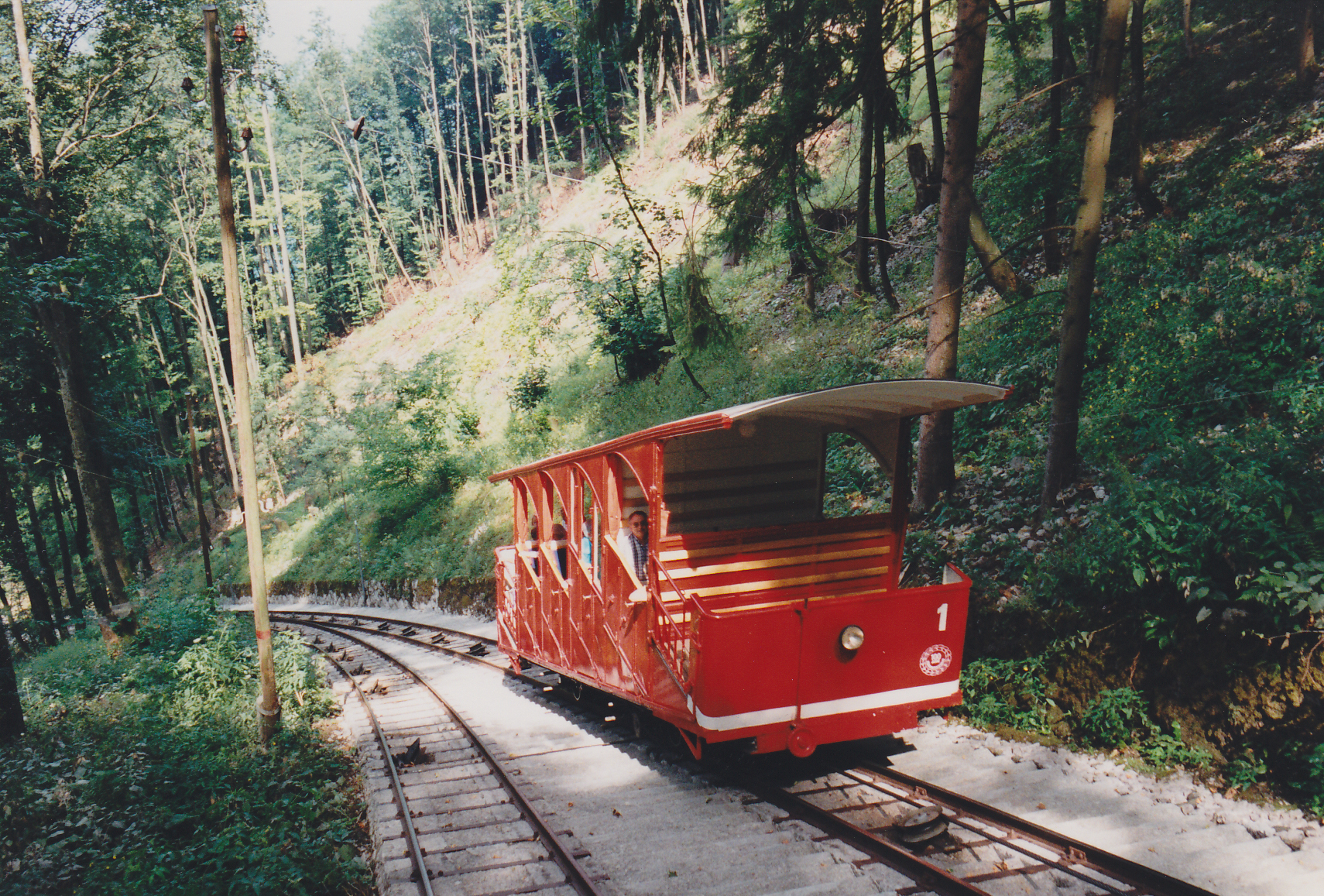

Overview
- Status: In operation
- Locale: Lake Lucerne, Switzerland
- Termini: Kehrsiten-Bürgenstock BB; Bürgenstock
- Stations: 2

Service
- Type: Funicular
- Rolling stock: 2

History
- Opened: 8 July 1888 (137 years ago)
- Closed for refurbishing: 2011
- Reopened: 28 August 2017

Technical
- Track length: 929 metres (3,048 ft)
- Number of tracks: 1 with passing loop
- Rack system: (originally Abt)
- Track gauge: 1,000 mm (3 ft 3 3/8 in)
- Electrification: from opening
- Highest elevation: 869 m (2,851 ft)
- Maximum incline: 58%

The Bürgenstock Funicular (German: Bürgenstock-Bahn; BB) is a funicular railway in the canton of Nidwalden, Switzerland. The line links the landing stage at Kehrsiten-Bürgenstock, served by the regular passenger boats of the Schifffahrtsgesellschaft des Vierwaldstättersees, with the Bürgenstock resort and its famous hotels.

The funicular was opened in 1888 and was originally had an Abt rack braking rail. The funicular is electric and automatic, but until the closure in 2011 it still used the original cabins. The line has been suspended since November 2011 whilst work was undertaken to create a new luxury resort financed by a Qatar finance group at its upper station, and was reopened on 28 August 2017.

It got bad press even before its reopening due to its exorbitant fare prices which are high, even for Swiss standards. The resort management announced a fare of CHF 50 for a roundtrip.

The line has the following parameters:

Feature	Value
Number of cars	2
Number of stops	2
Configuration	Single track with passing loop
Track length	929 metres (3,048 ft)
Rise	434 metres (1,424 ft)
Maximum gradient	58%
Track gauge	1,000 mm (3 ft 3 3/8 in) metre gauge
Speed	6 metres per second (19.7 ft/s)
Journey time	4 mins

== See also ==
- List of funicular railways
- List of funiculars in Switzerland
