= Rigi Staffel railway station =

Railway station in Switzerland

Rigi Staffel
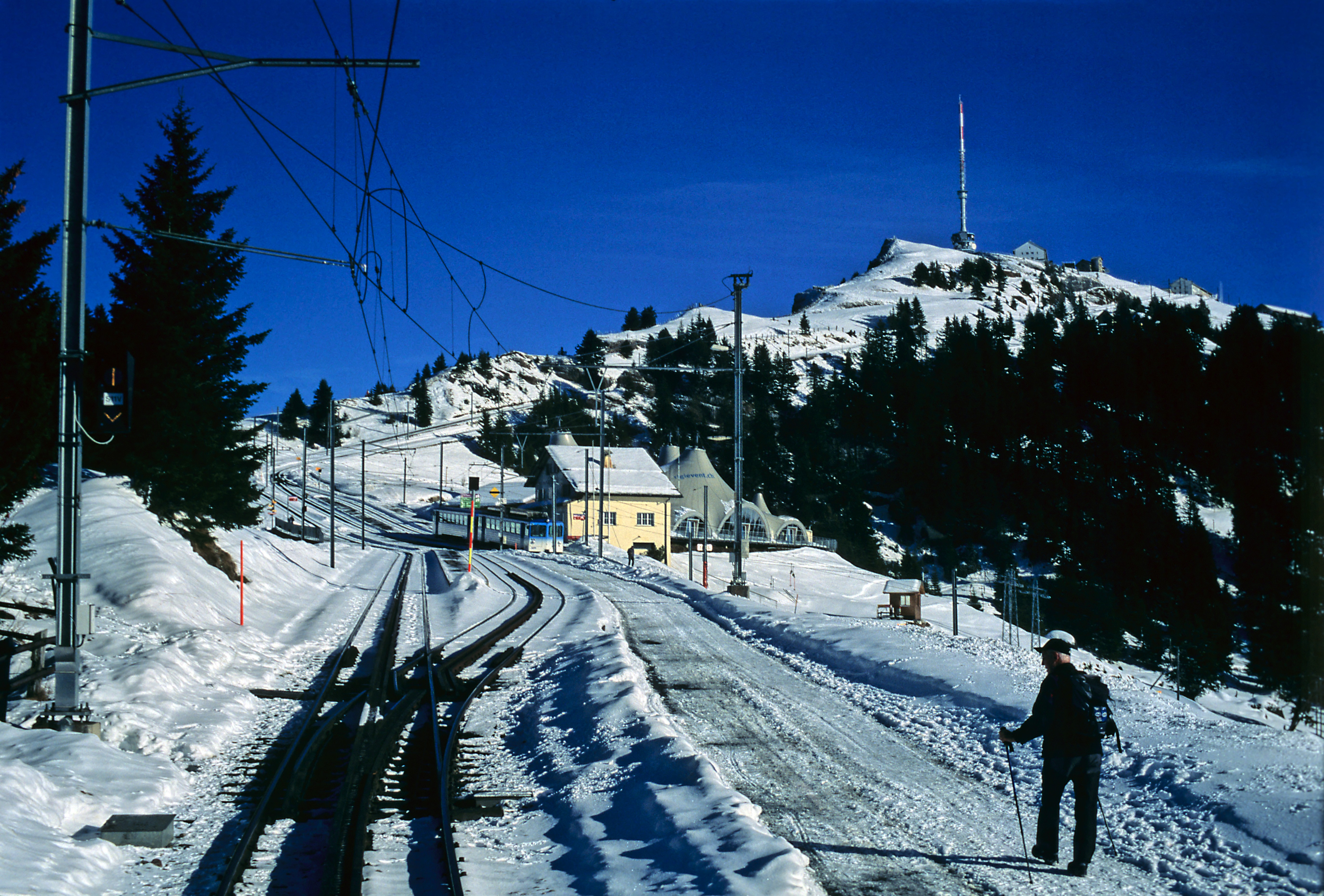
- Station in winter (2009)

General information
- Location: Staffelhöheweg; Arth; Switzerland
- Coordinates: 47°03′14″N 8°28′26″E
- Elevation: 1,604 m (5,262 ft)
- Owner: Rigi Railways (since 1992), Arth–Rigi Bahn (1873–1992)
- Lines: Arth–Rigi (since 1875); Vitznau–Rigi (since 1873)
- Distance: 5.9 km (3.7 mi) from Vitznau; 7.1 km (4.4 mi) from Arth-Goldau RB
- Platforms: 2 side platforms
- Tracks: 2
- Train operators: Rigi Railways

History
- Opened: 1873

Services
| Preceding station | Rigi Railways | Following station |
|---|---|---|
| Rigi Wölfertschen-First towards Arth-Goldau RB | Regio | Rigi Kulm Terminus |
| Rigi Staffelhöhe towards Vitznau | Regio | Rigi Kulm Terminus |
Location

Rigi Staffel railway station is a railway station at 1,604 m (5,262 ft) on Rigi at the junction of the rack railways Arth–Rigi railway and Vitznau–Rigi railway, just below the terminus Rigi Kulm. It is located in the municipality of Arth, canton of Schwyz, Switzerland.

== Layout ==
Rigi Staffel has two side platforms and two tracks, one serving the Arth–Rigi line and one serving the Vitznau–Rigi line.

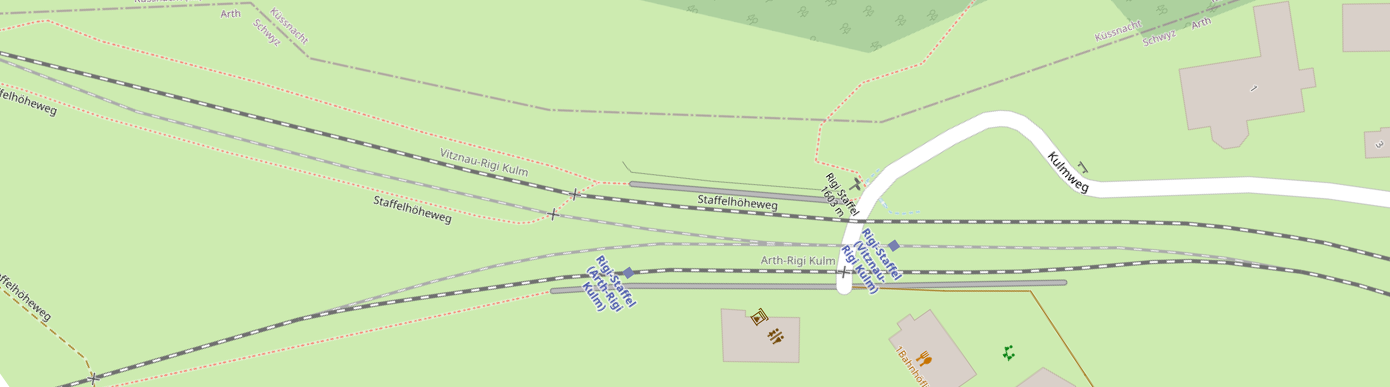
The track layout at Rigi Staffel: track from Vitznau–Rigi railway on the top left side, track from Arth–Rigi railway on the lower left side; to Rigi Kulm on the right side.

== Services ==
As of the December 2022 timetable change, the following services stop at Rigi Staffel:

- Regio: hourly service to Rigi Kulm, Vitznau, and Arth-Goldau RB.
