= Rigi railway =

Rigi railway may refer to:

- Vitznau–Rigi railway line
- Arth–Rigi railway line

== See also ==
- Rigi Railways
- Seilbahn Rigiblick
- Zecca–Righi funicular
