= Vitznau =

- Municipality
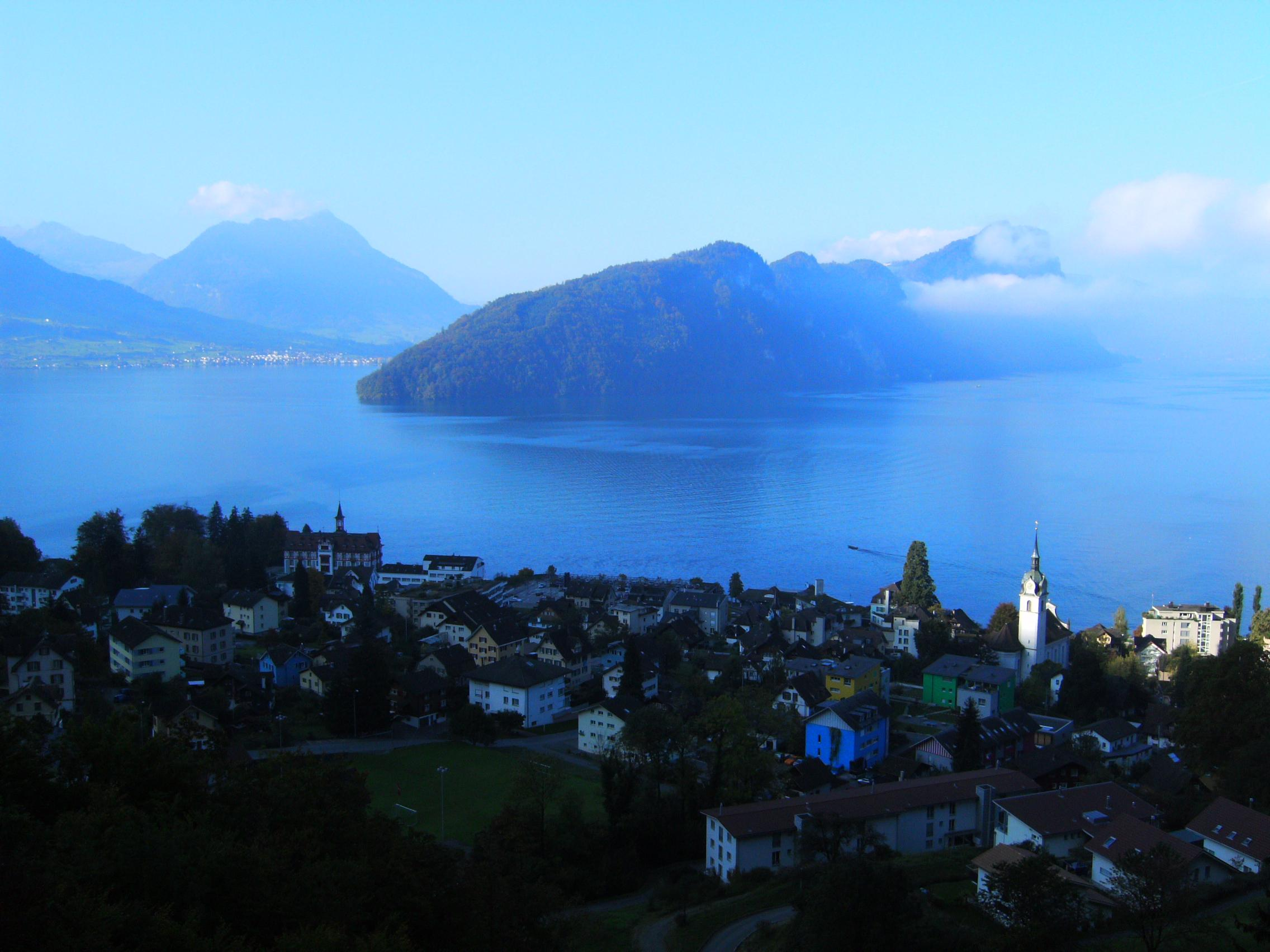

- Coat of arms
- Location of Vitznau
- Location within Switzerland Location within Canton of Lucerne
- Coordinates: 47°1′N 8°29′E
- Country: Switzerland
- Canton: Lucerne
- District: Lucerne

Area
  - Total: 11.76 km^{2} (4.54 sq mi)
- Elevation: 438 m (1,437 ft)

Population (December 2020)
  - Total: 1,426
  - Density: 121.3/km^{2} (314.1/sq mi)
- Time zone: UTC+01:00 (CET)
  - Summer (DST): UTC+02:00 (CEST)
- Postal code: 6354
- SFOS number: 1068
- ISO 3166 code: CH-LU
- Surrounded by: Arth (SZ), Ennetbürgen (NW), Gersau (SZ), Weggis
- Website: www.vitznau.ch

Vitznau is a municipality in the district of Lucerne in the canton of Lucerne in Switzerland.

== History ==
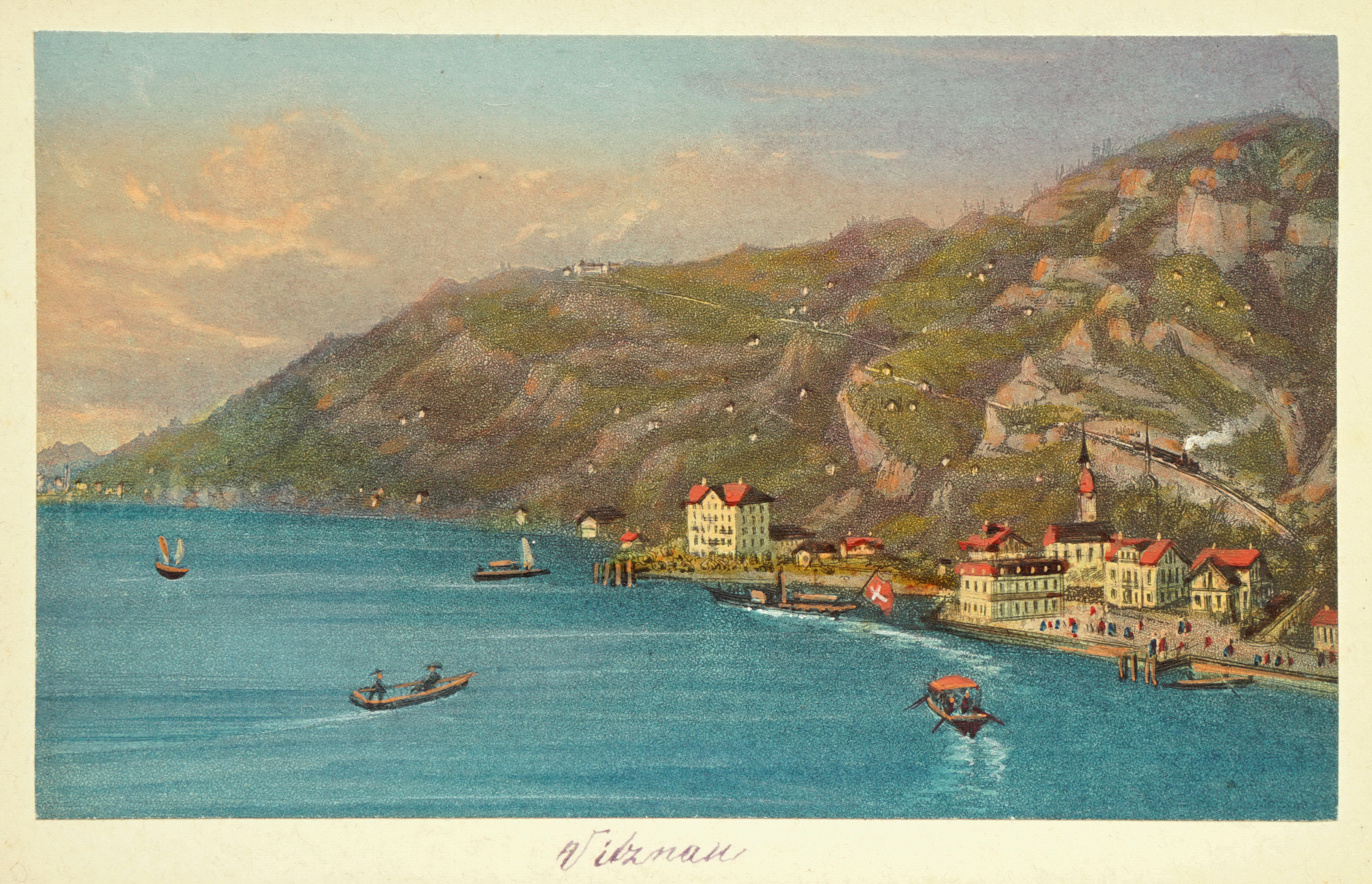
Vitznau c. 1880, with rack railway (opened in 1871) and steamboat. Etching by Heinrich Müller

Vitznau was first mentioned in 998. In the 19th century, it became a popular destination for tourism, especially from England; the imposing Park Hotel Vitznau west of the town dates from the 1900s.

== Geography ==
Aerial view (1947)

The village occupies a narrow strip between the lake and the Rigi looming behind; one of the mountain railways to the summit starts in Vitznau.

Vitznau has an area of 8.9 km^{2} (3.4 sq mi). Of this area, 32.2% is used for agricultural purposes, while 56.3% is forested. Of the rest of the land, 7.5% is settled (buildings or roads) and the remainder (4%) is non-productive (rivers, glaciers or mountains). In the 1997 land survey, 56.28% of the total land area was forested. Of the agricultural land, 30.38% is used for farming or pastures, while 1.79% is used for orchards or vine crops. Of the settled areas, 4.71% is covered with buildings, 0.11% is industrial, 0.22% is classed as special developments, 0.56% is parks or greenbelts and 1.91% is transportation infrastructure. Of the unproductive areas, 0.11% is unproductive standing water (ponds or lakes), 0.11% is unproductive flowing water (rivers) and 3.81% is other unproductive land.

== Demographics ==
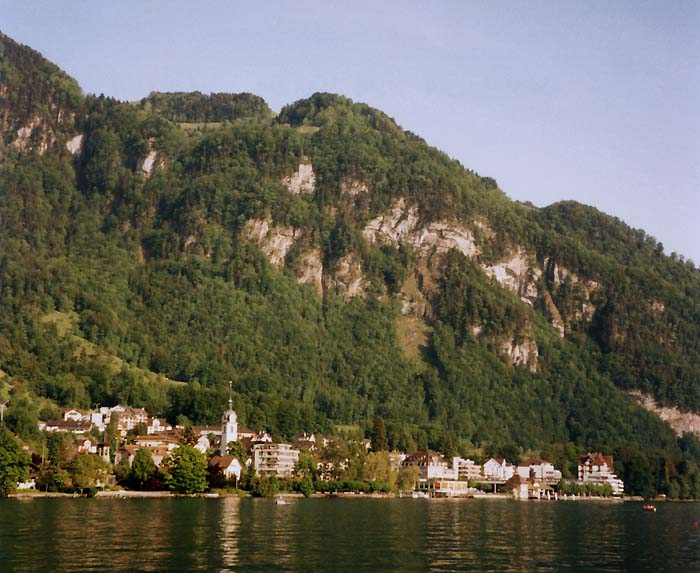
Vitznau seen from across Lake Lucerne, nested under a shoulder of the Rigi.

Vitznau has a population (as of 31 December 2020) of 1,426. As of 2007, 22.0% of the population was made up of foreign nationals. Over the last 10 years the population has grown at a rate of 11.7%. Most of the population (as of 2000) speaks German (91.7%), with Albanian being second most common ( 3.1%) and Italian third ( 1.2%).

In the 2007 election the most popular party was the SVP which received 29.1% of the vote. The next three most popular parties were the FDP (24.1%), the CVP (23.7%) and the Green Party (10.9%).

The age distribution in Vitznau is; 262 people or 20.3% of the population is 0–19 years old. 354 people or 27.5% are 20–39 years old, and 436 people or 33.8% are 40–64 years old. The senior population distribution is 176 people or 13.7% are 65–79 years old, 52 or 4% are 80–89 years old and 9 people or 0.7% of the population are 90+ years old.

In Vitznau about 70.8% of the population (between age 25-64) have completed either non-mandatory upper secondary education or additional higher education (either university or a Fachhochschule).

As of 2000 there are 433 households, of which 149 households (or about 34.4%) contain only a single individual. 34 or about 7.9% are large households, with at least five members. As of 2000 there were 239 inhabited buildings in the municipality, of which 174 were built only as housing, and 65 were mixed use buildings. There were 88 single family homes, 32 double family homes, and 54 multi-family homes in the municipality. Most homes were either two (61) or three (79) story structures. There were only 4 single story buildings and 30 four or more story buildings.

Vitznau has an unemployment rate of 1.96%. As of 2005, there were 77 people employed in the primary economic sector and about 26 businesses involved in this sector. 52 people are employed in the secondary sector and there are 14 businesses in this sector. 358 people are employed in the tertiary sector, with 45 businesses in this sector. As of 2000 51.6% of the population of the municipality were employed in some capacity. At the same time, females made up 42% of the workforce.

In the 2000 census the religious membership of Vitznau was; 771 (74.2%) were Roman Catholic, and 132 (12.7%) were Protestant, with an additional 8 (0.77%) that were of some other Christian faith. There are 23 individuals (2.21% of the population) who are Muslim. Of the rest; there were 4 (0.38%) individuals who belong to another religion, 71 (6.83%) who do not belong to any organized religion, 30 (2.89%) who did not answer the question.

== Transport ==
The municipality has four railway stations: Vitznau, Freibergen, Grubisbalm, and Mittlerschwanden. All four are located on the Vitznau–Rigi line of Rigi Railways, which ascends from the shore of Lake Lucerne to the top of the Rigi. Vitznau is also a ferry terminal with regular service by the Lake Lucerne Navigation Company to various destinations on the lake.
