= Weggis landing stage =

Weggis
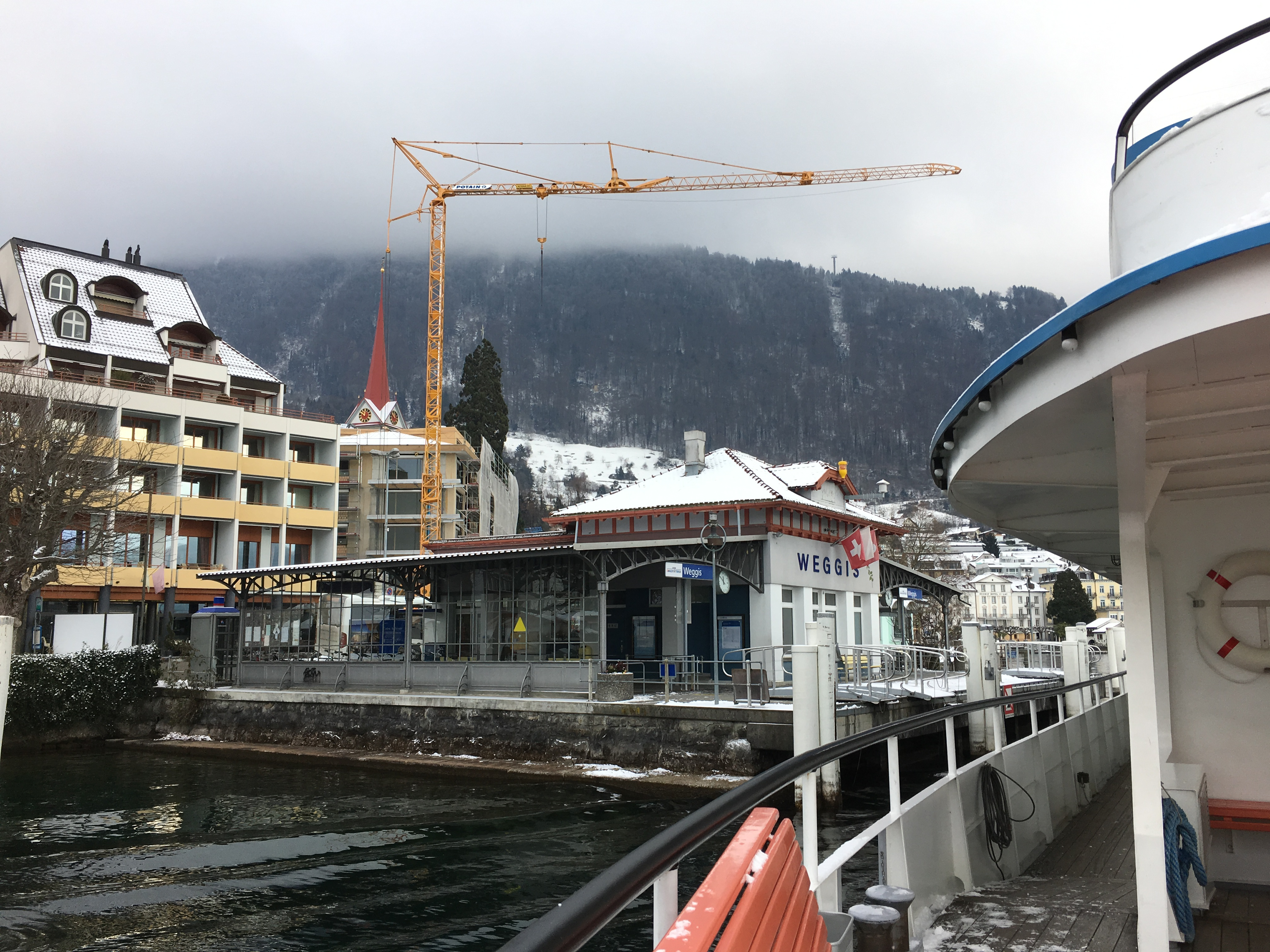
- The terminal in 2017

General information
- Location: Weggis, Lucerne; Switzerland
- Coordinates: 47°01′53″N 8°26′00″E
- Elevation: 435 m (1,427 ft)
- Owner: Lake Lucerne Navigation Company
- Platforms: 1 pier
- Connections: Auto AG Schwyz bus lines

Other information
- Fare zone: 39 (Passepartout); 691 (Tarifverbund Schwyz)

Services
Preceding station	Lake Lucerne Navigation Company	Following station
Hertenstein towards Luzern Bahnhofquai	Lucerne–Flüelen	Vitznau towards Flüelen
Kehrsiten-Bürgenstock towards Luzern Bahnhofquai	Lucerne–Flüelen	Vitznau towards Flüelen
Location

Weggis landing stage is a ferry port in the municipality of Weggis, in the Swiss canton of Lucerne. It is located on a projection of the Rigi mountain that protrudes into the northern part of Lake Lucerne. It is served by the Lake Lucerne Navigation Company.

== Services ==
As of the December 2020 timetable change, the following services stop at Weggis:

- Lake Lucerne Navigation Company: hourly service between Luzern Bahnhofquai and Brunnen; some ships continue from Brunnen to Flüelen.
