= Arth-Goldau RB railway station =

Train station in Switzerland

Arth-Goldau RB
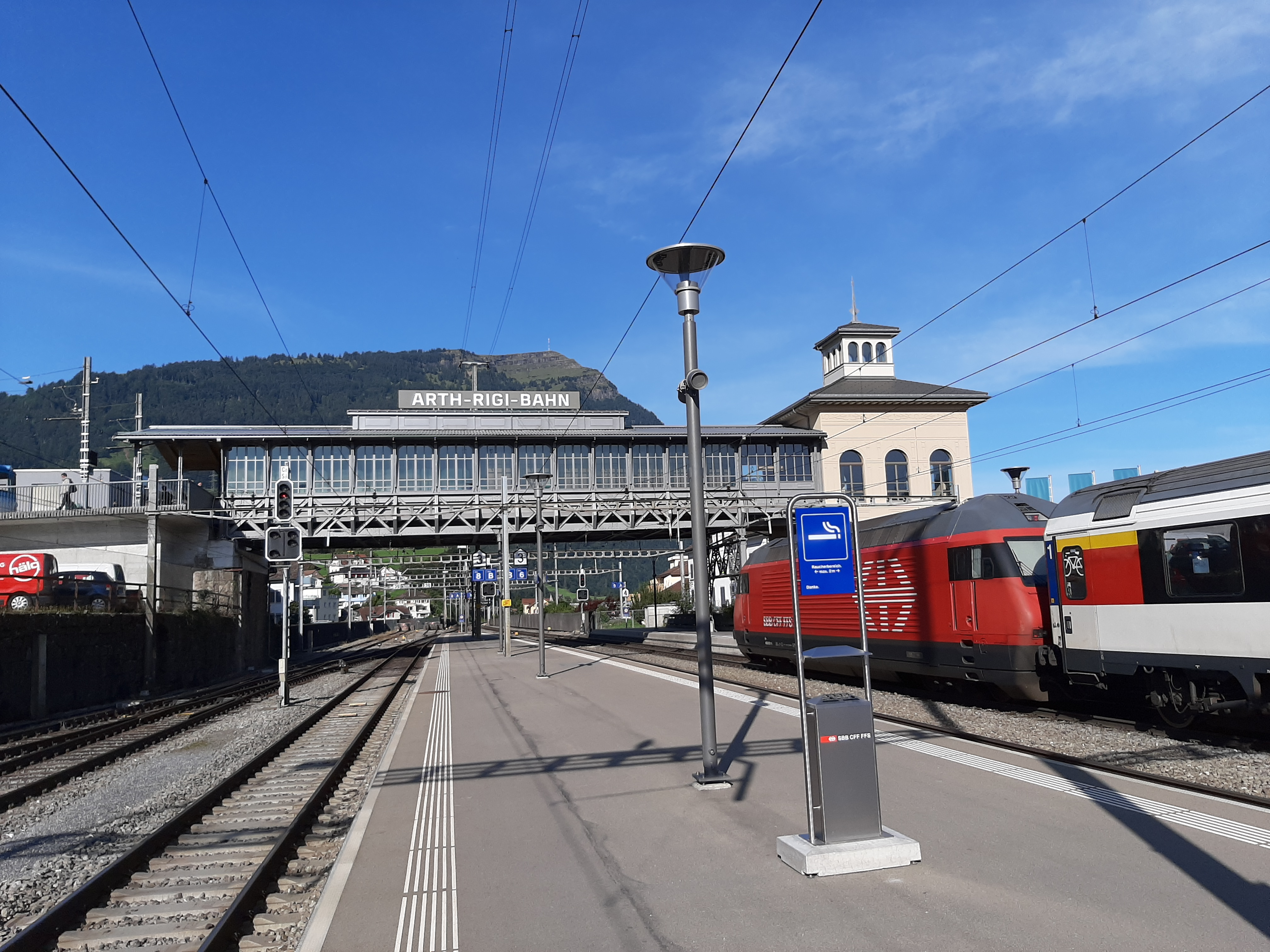
- The Rigi station platforms sit above platforms 5–8 of the SBB station

General information
- Location: Arth; Switzerland
- Coordinates: 47°02′56″N 8°32′52″E
- Elevation: 510 m (1,670 ft)
- Owner: Rigi Railways
- Line: Arth–Rigi line
- Train operators: Rigi Railways
- Connections: Auto AG Schwyz bus lines

Services
Preceding station	Rigi Railways	Following station
Goldau A4 towards Rigi Kulm	Regio	Terminus
Location

Arth-Goldau RB railway station (German: Bahnhof Arth-Goldau RB) is a railway station in the municipality of Arth, in the Swiss canton of Schwyz. It is the terminus of the standard gauge Arth–Rigi line of Rigi Railways. The station consists of an elevated platform above the mainline Arth-Goldau station of Swiss Federal Railways.

== Services ==
As of the December 2020 timetable change, the following services stop at Arth-Goldau RB:

- Regio: hourly service to Rigi Kulm.
