= Vitznau railway station =

Train station and port in Switzerland

Vitznau
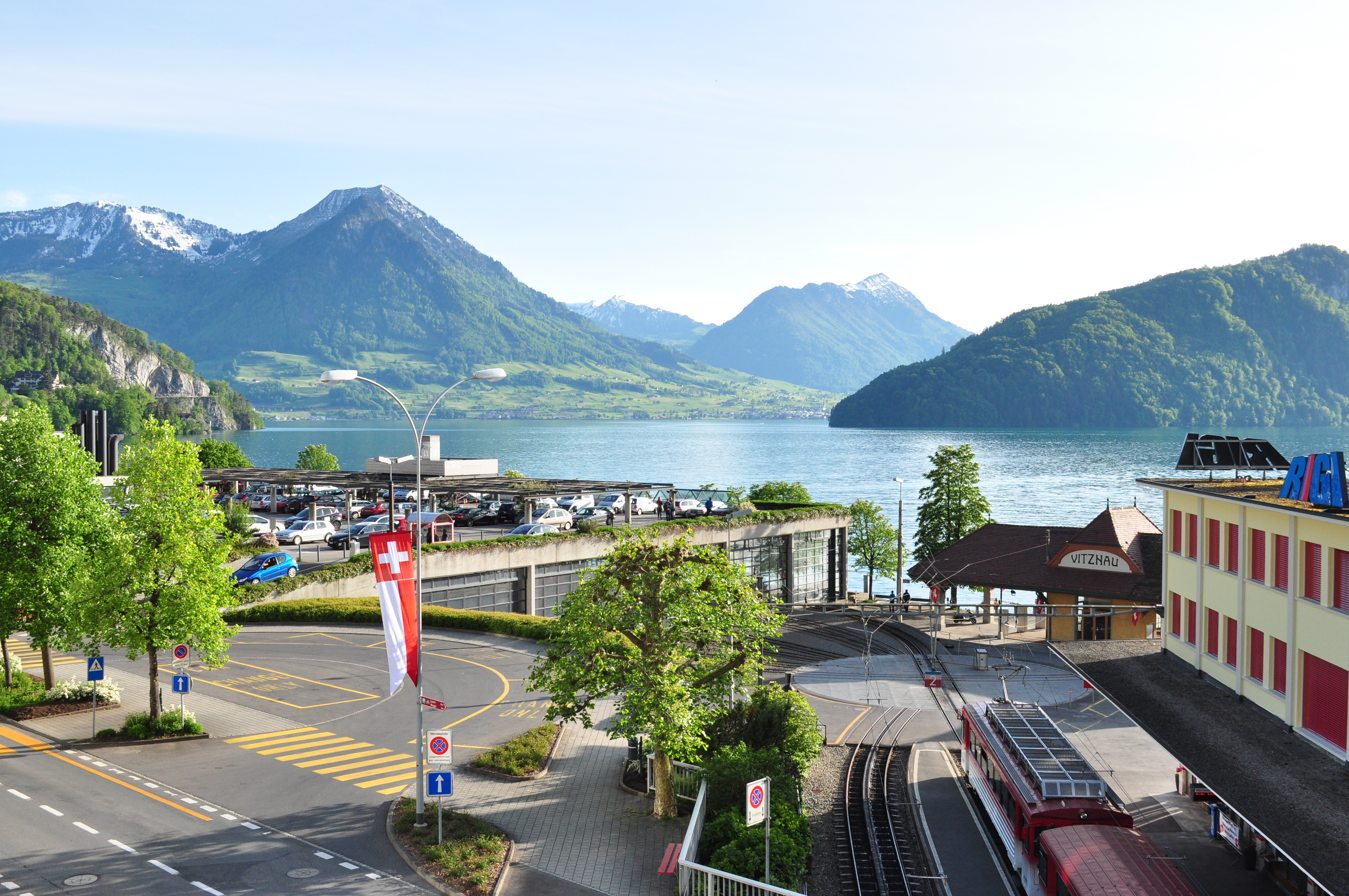
- The station in 2012

General information
- Location: Vitznau, Lucerne; Switzerland
- Coordinates: 47°00′32″N 8°28′55″E
- Elevation: 435 m (1,427 ft)
- Owner: Lake Lucerne Navigation Company
- Line: Vitznau–Rigi line
- Platforms: 1 island platform
- Tracks: 2
- Train operators: Rigi Railways
- Connections: Auto AG Schwyz bus lines

Other information
- Fare zone: 39 (Passepartout); 692 (Tarifverbund Schwyz)

Services
Preceding station	Lake Lucerne Navigation Company	Following station
Weggis towards Luzern Bahnhofquai	Lucerne–Flüelen	Ennetbürgen towards Flüelen
Preceding station	Rigi Railways	Following station
Terminus	Regio	Mittlerschwanden towards Rigi Kulm
Location

Vitznau railway station (German: Bahnhof Vitznau) is a railway station and ferry terminal in the municipality of Vitznau, in the Swiss canton of Lucerne. It is the terminus of the standard gauge Vitznau–Rigi line of Rigi Railways. The Lake Lucerne Navigation Company (SGV) operates regular ferry service to Lucerne and Flüelen, on Lake Lucerne.

== Layout ==
The railway portion of the station has a single island platform with two tracks. A turntable allows trains to reach the Rigi Railways depot, adjacent to the station but at almost a ninety-degree angle from it, parallel to Lake Lucerne. The Lake Lucerne Navigation Company station building and piers are adjacent as well, on the shores of the lake. Auto AG Schwyz buses load and unload on Seestrasse, to the rear of the station facilities.

== Services ==
As of the December 2020 timetable change, the following services stop at Vitznau:

- Lake Lucerne Navigation Company: hourly service between Luzern Bahnhofquai and Brunnen; some ships continue from Brunnen to Flüelen.
- Regio: hourly service to Rigi Kulm.
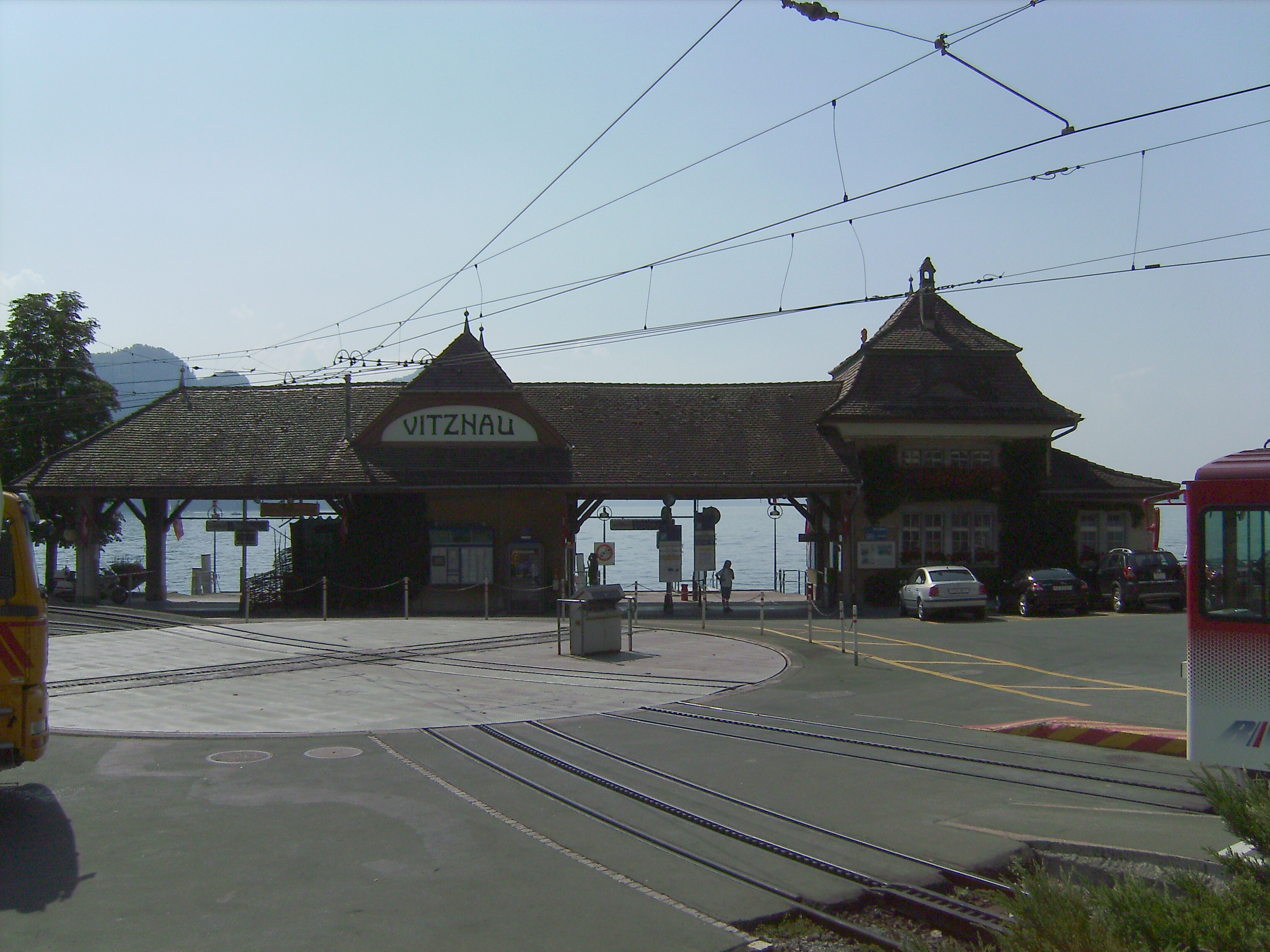
turntable and landing stage (2007)

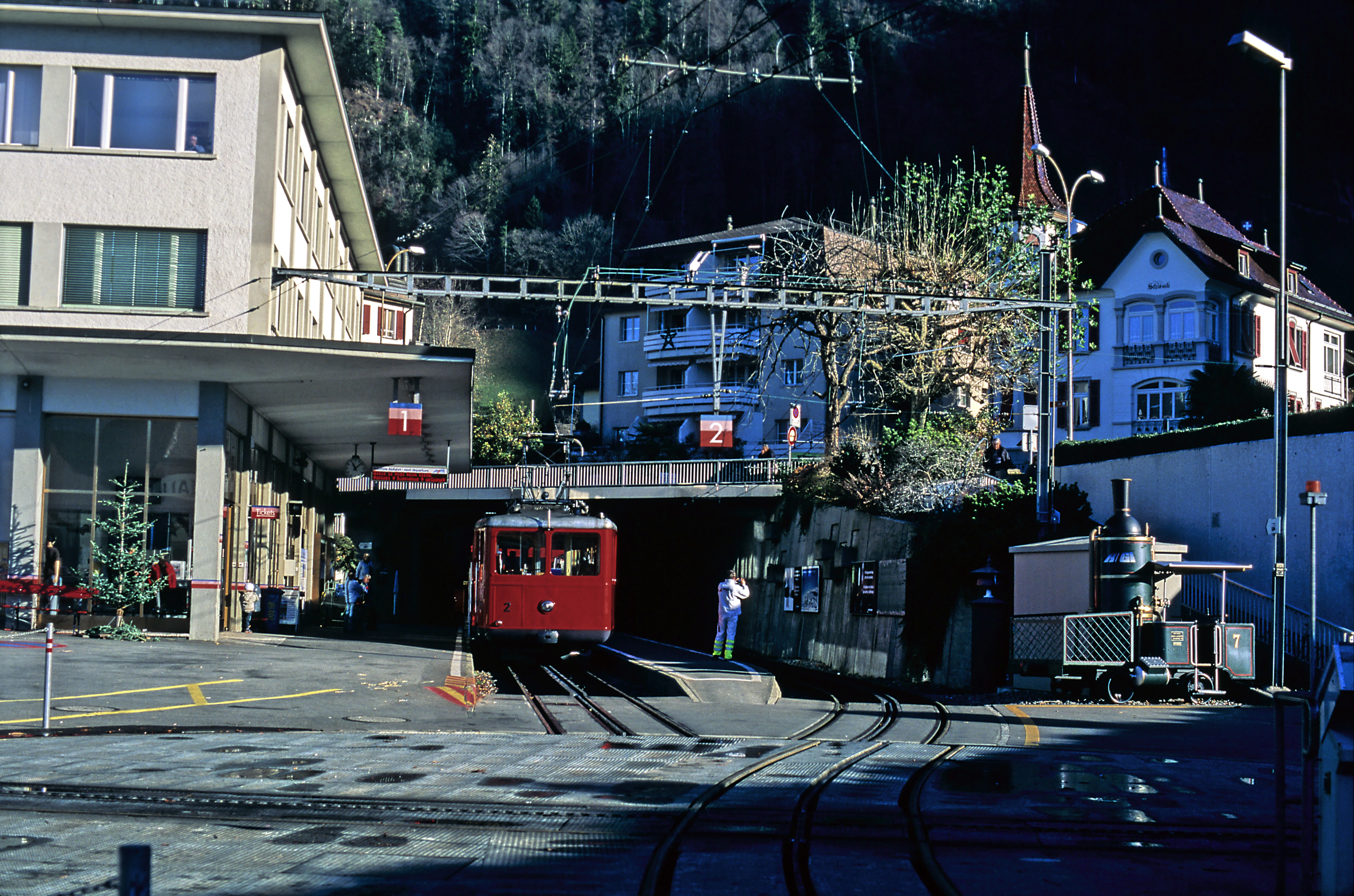
station in 2009

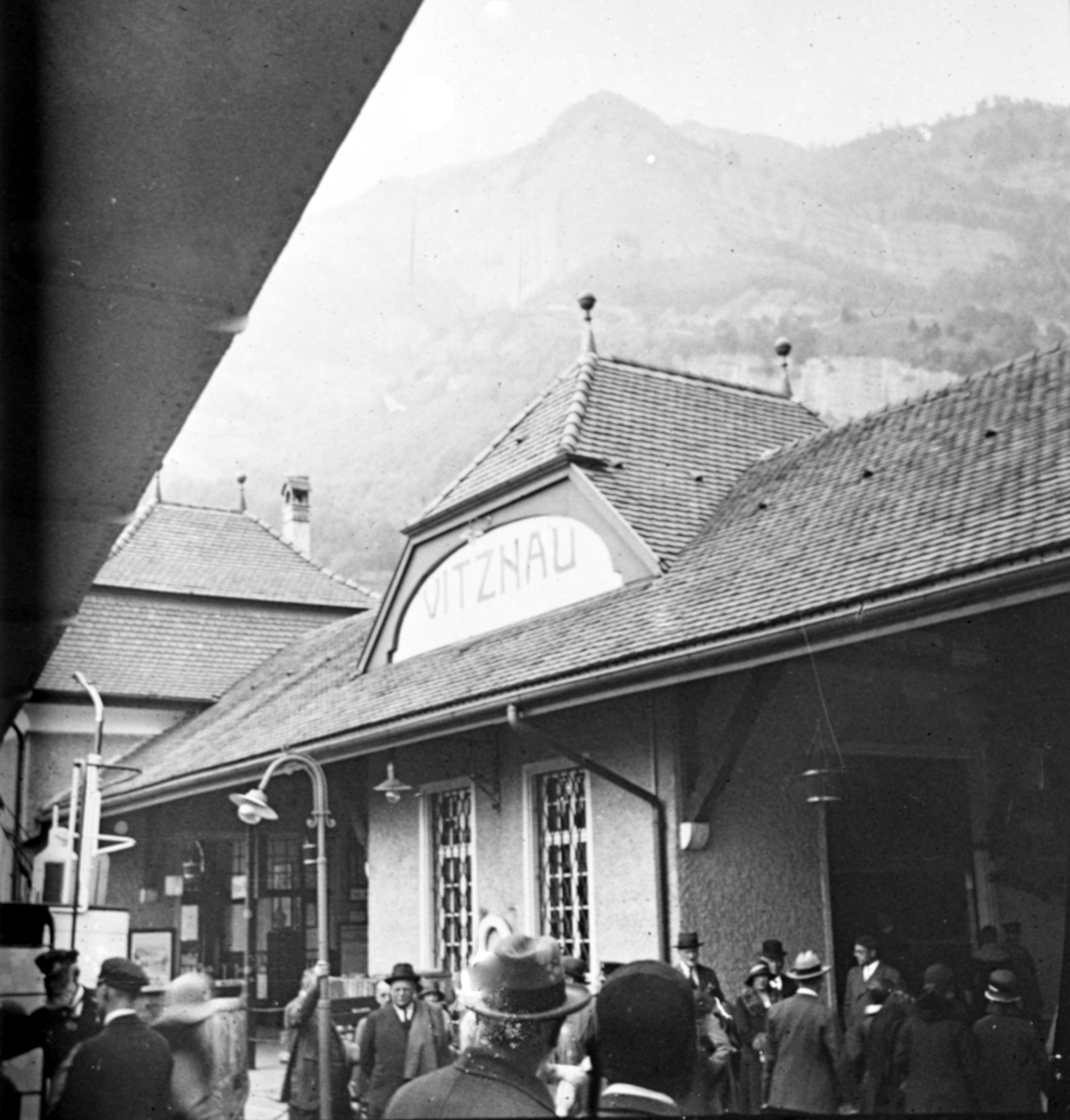
station ca. 1931
