= Rigi Railways =

Rail transport company based in Switzerland

Coordinates: 47°00′35″N 8°28′59″E

- Native name: Rigi-Bahnen
- Industry: Rail transport
- Predecessors: Arth-Rigi-Bahn; Vitznau-Rigi-Bahn
- Founded: January 1, 1992; 34 years ago in Goldau, Schwyz
- Headquarters: Goldau
- Website: www.rigi.ch/en

Rigi Railways (German: Rigi Bahnen) is a railway company that operates a group of railways on the mountain Rigi, located between two of the arms of Lake Lucerne, in Switzerland. They include two standard gauge rack railways, the Vitznau–Rigi Bahn (VRB) and the Arth–Rigi Bahn (ARB), along with the Luftseilbahn Weggis–Rigi Kaltbad (LWRK) cable car.

Reaching a height of 1,752 metres (5,748 ft) above sea level, the Rigi Railways are the highest standard gauge railway in Europe. They are also the highest railway in both cantons of Lucerne and Schwyz. The Vitznau–Rigi Bahn is also notable as the first mountain rack railway in Europe, and even the second in the world, after the Mount Washington Cog Railway in the United States.

== History ==
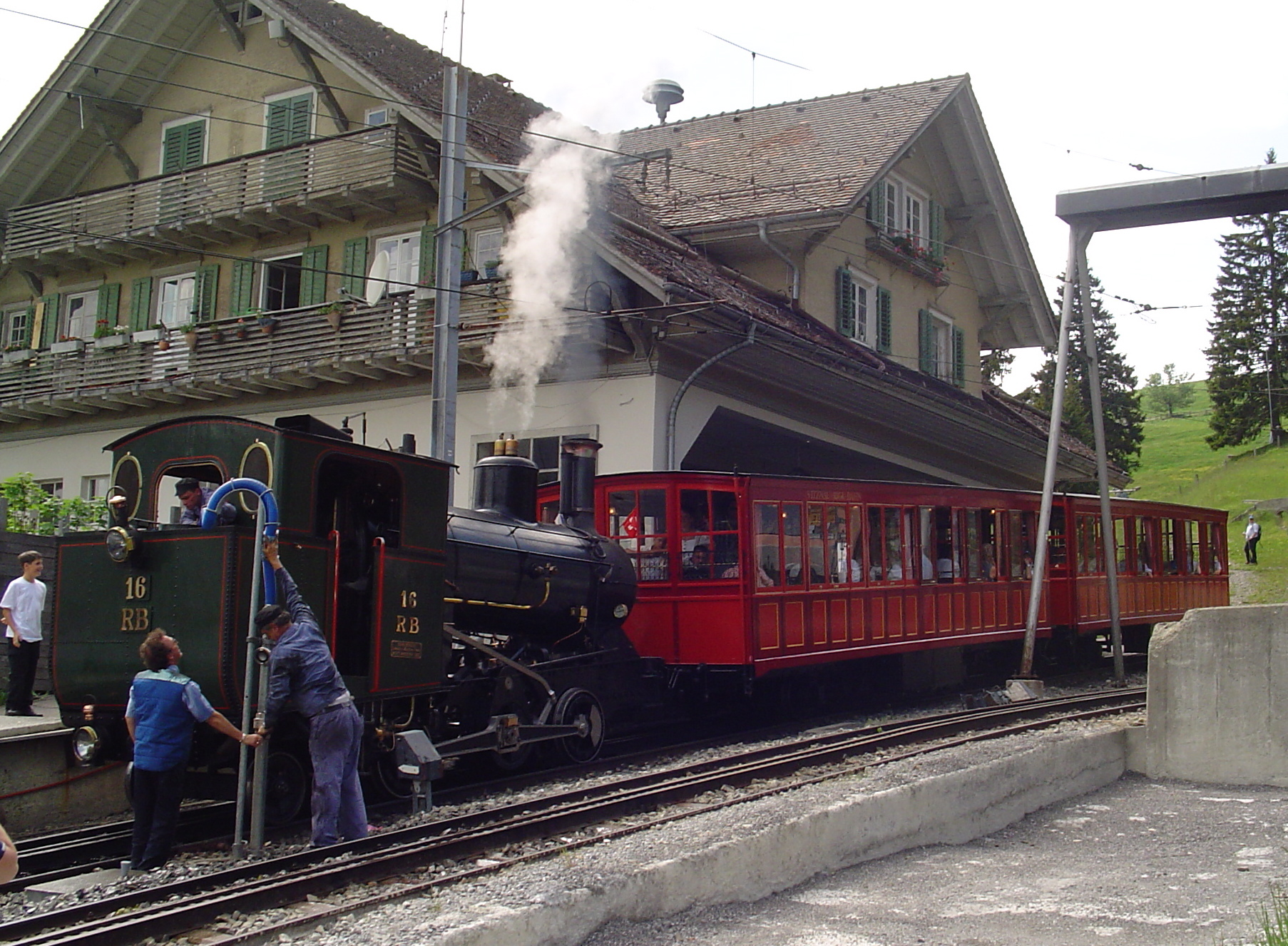
Historic steam on the Rigi. Rigibahn No.16, built by SLM (Works No.2871) in 1923

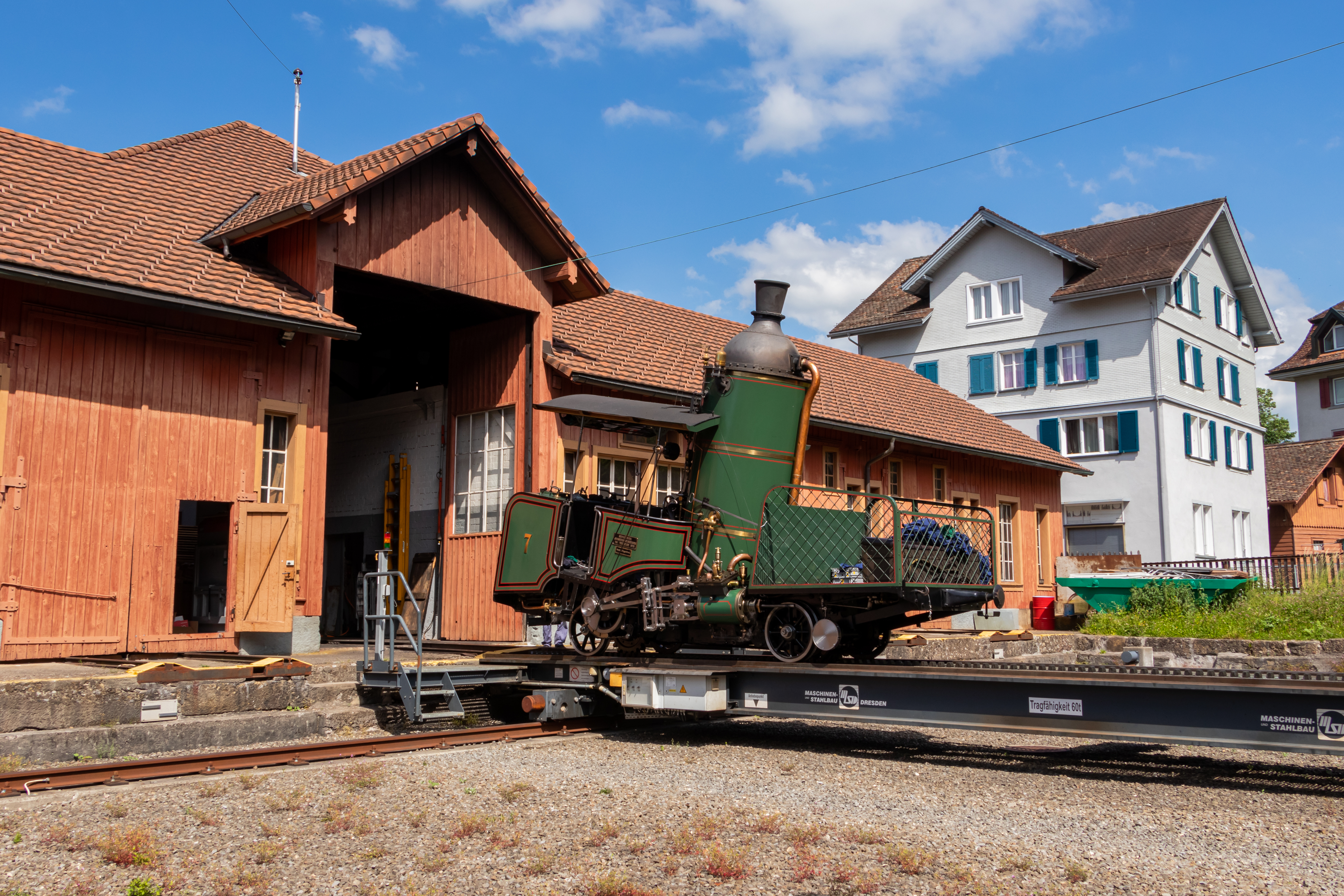
This locomotive is still used in historic rides on special occasions. Built in 1873, it is the only remaining standard gauge rack fitted vertical boilered loco in the world. The two cylinder steam engine provides 196 PS power under 7.5 km/h speed. The loco was removed from service in 1937, when the railway was electrified, but has been returned in 1996 for the 125th anniversary of the railway. Normally it is on exhibition at the Swiss transport museum and has run again in 2009 and 2021.

=== Building of the Vitznau–Rigi railway ===
Aware of the scenic location of Mount Rigi, Swiss engineer Niklaus Riggenbach masterminded the construction of a railway from Vitznau, on the shores of Lake Lucerne and the southern flank of Mount Rigi, to a point close to its summit. He already had the technology as he had patented, in France in 1863, a system of toothed racks set between the railway tracks interlocking with cogwheels fitted under the locomotives.

Jointly, with fellow engineers Olivier Zschokke and Adolf Naef, he submitted an application to the canton of Lucerne for permission to build a line from Vitznau to Rigi Staffelhöhe, a point somewhat below the summit of Rigi, but the nearest point to the summit within that canton. The cantonal administration already knew of the success of the Mount Washington Railway and saw the advantages in this construction, granting permission on 9 June 1869.

The construction itself began in the following September, the limited liability company, which had offered 1250 shares was greatly over-subscribed on the first day of issue. On 21 May 1870, Riggenbach's birthday, locomotive No.1, named Stadt Luzern, made its first trial run. Exactly one year later the first mountain railway using rack and pinion technology was officially opened. Riggenbach, never noted for missing an opportunity, drove the first train to the upper terminus at Rigi Staffelhöhe.

The line, from Vitznau to Rigi Staffelhöhe was 5 km (3.1 mi) long and climbed a total of 1,115 m (3,658 ft) to reach a height of 1,550 m (5,085 ft) at its summit, the maximum gradient being 1 in 4 (25%).

=== Trains reach the summit ===
As originally built, the Vitznau–Rigi railway only reached Rigi Staffelhöhe, as that was the cantonal boundary between the canton of Lucerne and the canton of Schwyz. The summit of Mount Rigi is situated in the canton of Schwyz, along with the northern slopes of the mountain and the town of Arth on Lake Zug below.

In 1870, a committee made up of 12 citizens of Arth were granted a concession from the Schwyz Cantonal Council for a railway to operate from Arth via Oberarth to Rigi Kulm, together with a second line to connect Rigi Staffelhöhe to Rigi Kulm. The same engineering team who were responsible for the Vitznau–Rigi railway also undertook responsibility for the construction for these lines.

The Arth company started by building the line from Rigi Staffelhöhe to Rigi Kulm, and this was ready for opening in time for the summer traffic in 1873. This line made an end-on connection with that from Vitznau and the Vitznau company operated their trains over it, paying the Arth company a ground rent for its use. This state of affairs continued until the merger in 1992.

The line from Rigi Staffelhöhe to Rigi Kulm, was just 1.8 km (1.1 mi) long but enabled trains to reach the summit at Rigi Kulm, a height of 1,752 m (5,748 ft) above sea level, a climb of a further 202 m (662.7 ft) from Rigi Staffelhöhe.

=== Building of the Arth–Rigi railway ===
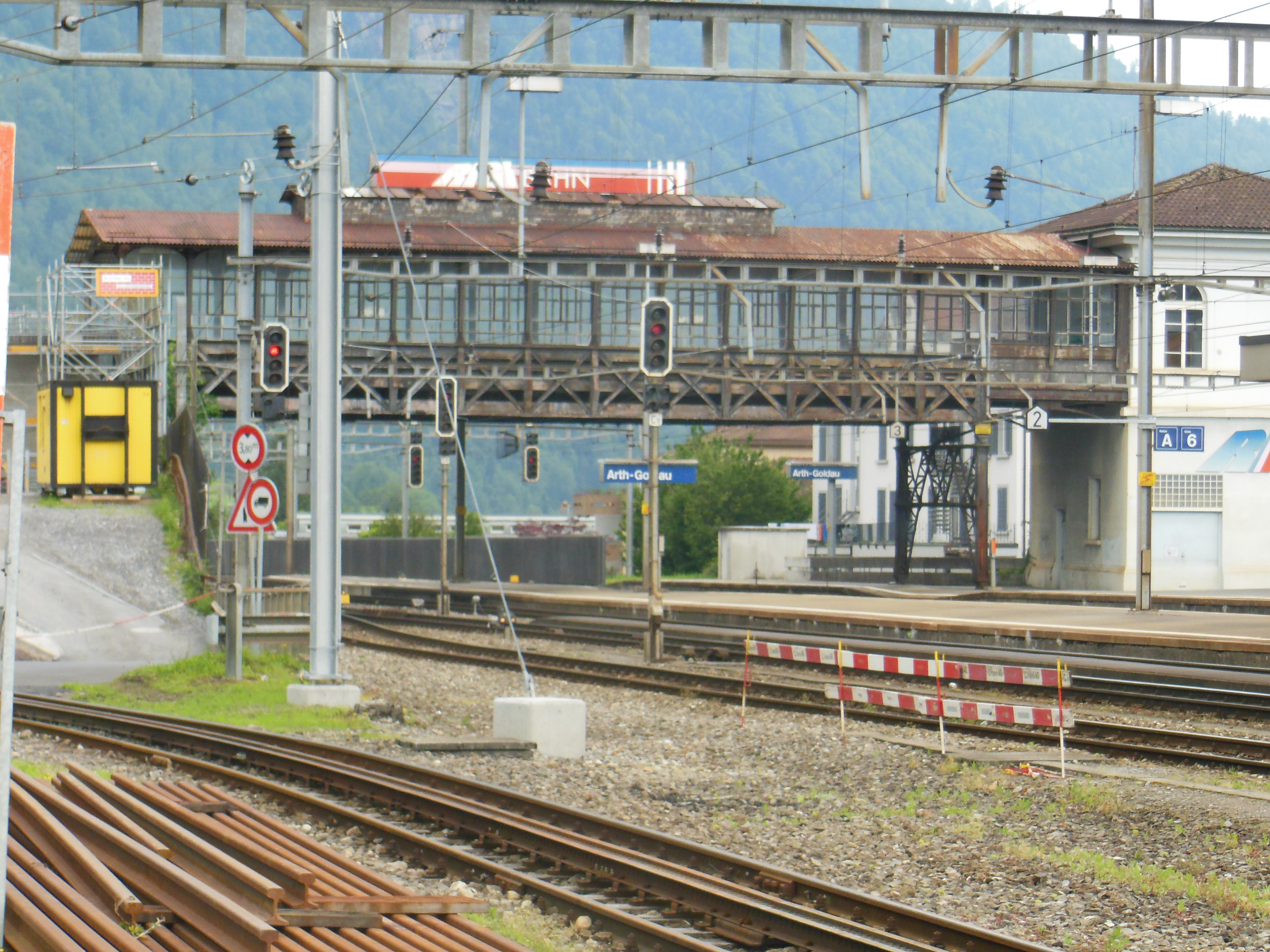
The high-level platform of the Arth–Rigi railway at Arth-Goldau station, with mainline platforms underneath

By the time construction started on the main line of the Arth–Rigi railway, construction had also started on the Gotthard railway, and it was clear that this main line railway would include a station in Arth, now known as Arth-Goldau station. It was clearly important that the Arth–Rigi line should connect with this station.

The concession to construct the Arth–Rigi railway was ceded, in 1873, to the International Company for Mountain Railways in Aarau, a company founded by Riggenbach and this company carried out the railway project as general contractor at a cost of CHF 4.2 million and also supplied five of the six steam locomotives needed to operate it. Construction of the first section, that from Arth-am-See, a station by Lake Zug, to Oberarth commenced in 1873 and once the position of the railway station had been agreed with the main line company, in 1874, construction work on the second section began, the Arth–Rigi railway becoming operational on 4 June 1875. The line offered only summertime services until 1884 when year-round operation commenced.

The line from Arth to the junction at Rigi Staffelhöhe was 6.8 km (4.2 mi) long, making the total length of the Arth line 8.6 km (5.3 mi) The maximum gradient is 1 in 5 (20%)

=== Building of the Rigi–Scheidegg Railway ===
Whilst the Arth–Rigi railway was under construction, another line on the Rigi massif was also being built. This linked Rigi Kaltbad, on the Vitznau-Rigi line, with Rigi Scheidegg to the east. Unlike the previous two lines, the Rigi–Scheidegg Railway followed the contours near the top of the mountain, rather than climbing it, and was not a rack railway. Also unlike the other two lines, it was built to 1,000 mm (3 ft 3 3/8 in) metre gauge rather than standard gauge, and so never made a direct connection to the other lines. The line opened, in two stages, in 1874 and 1875.

=== Electrification ===
The first electrification, on the short section of line from Arth to Goldau, came with the commencement of the winter timetable in 1906. The mountain section from Goldau to Rigi Kulm, only operated in the summer until 1928, had the power switched on the following year, making this the first standard gauge rack and pinion railway in the country to convert to electric traction. Electrification continued in 1937 when the other side of the mountain, the line from Vitznau, came under the wires. The electrification programme supplied power at 1500 V Direct Current from overhead wires.

=== Closures and a new line ===
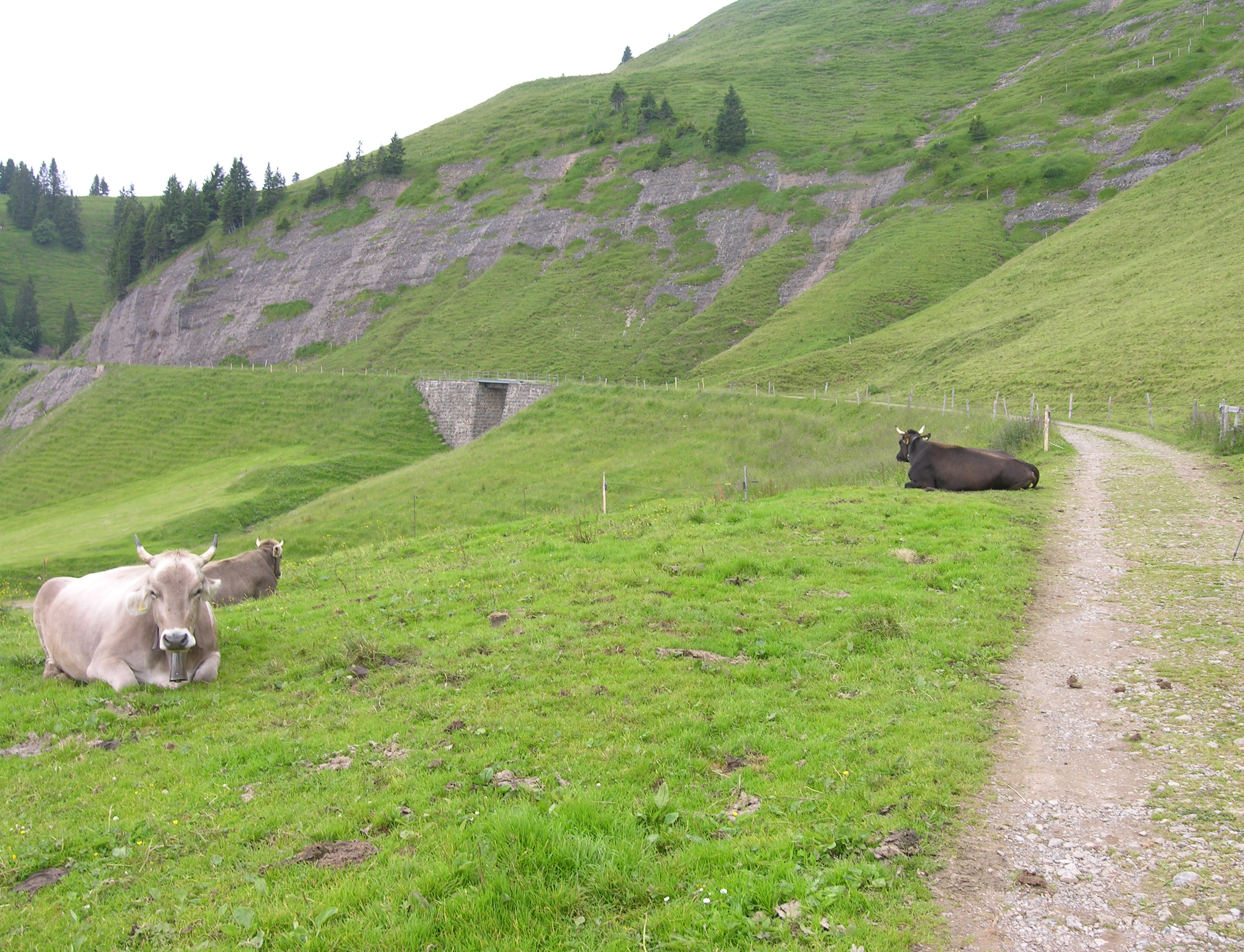
The closed Rigi–Scheidegg Railway

In 1931 the Rigi–Scheidegg Railway, which had never been electrified, was closed. This line, which includes a 70-metre (230 ft) tunnel and several bridges, now serves as a panoramic footpath and in winter is also used for cross country skiing.

It was not until 1 January 1959, when the section of the Arth–Rigi line between Arth, on Lake Zug, and Arth-Goldau station was replaced by a bus service, that the second closure took place. The Arth–Rigi line then terminated in its station above the main line tracks.

A new rail connection was built at Rigi Staffel, linking the Arth–Rigi railway and the Vitznau–Rigi railway, and opened in 1990.

=== Merger and aerial tramways ===
In 1967 the Swiss government granted an operating licence for an aerial cableway to run from near the shores of Lake Lucerne to a point near the summit of Mount Rigi. To avoid direct competition with the Vitznau–Rigi railway, the aerial cableway was to run from Weggis, where connections were available with the lake steamers from Lucerne, to meet the railway at Rigi Kaltbad. The licence was granted to the Rigi Railway Company.

The construction period was short, a mere eleven months saw the new aerial cableway completed and the opening took place on 15 July 1968. The cable car rises from the lakeside some 924 m (3,031 ft) to its summit and has a journey time of just 10 minutes. A 100-metre (328.1 ft) pathway at Rigi Kaltbad connects the mountain station of the cable car with the railway station.

The technical installations were the work of K. Garaventa & Sons of Goldau, and the large cabins were supplied by the Carrosseriewerke Company of Aarburg. On the 25th anniversary of the opening of the cable car (in 1993), the original two red passenger cabins were replaced by modern panorama cabins.

In 1992 the two railway companies merged to become the Rigi Railways Company and in the same year took over the Rigi Ski Lift Company.

== Operation ==
=== Termini ===
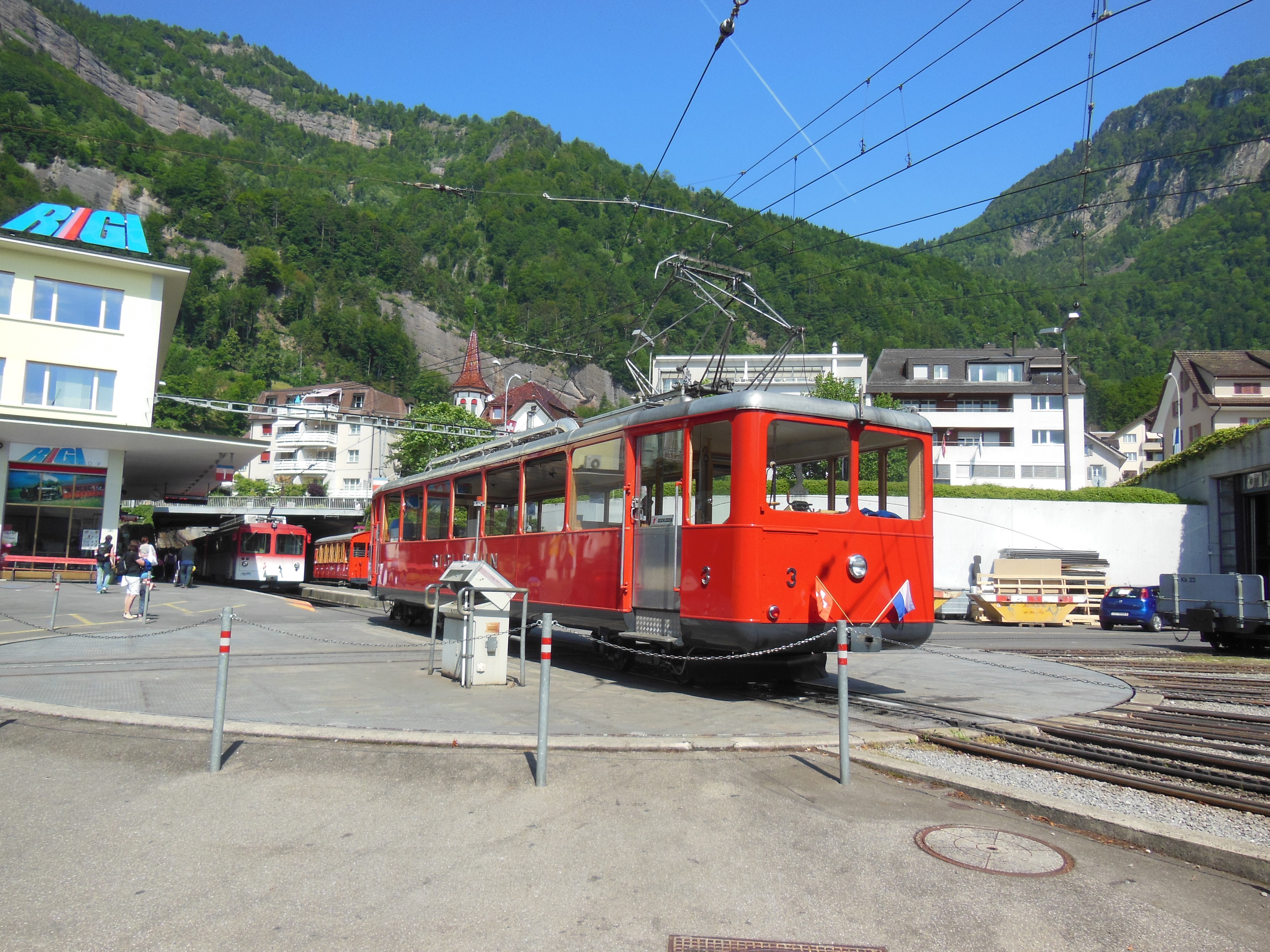
Vitznau terminus, with selection of different aged rolling stock in the station, and on the turntable linking station and depot

The Vitznau–Rigi railway commences from a terminal station in the centre of Vitznau, and adjacent to the landing stage served by the Schifffahrtsgesellschaft des Vierwaldstättersees. This company operates passenger vessels, including some historic paddle steamers, on services that link Vitznau with the city of Lucerne and other places on Lake Lucerne. The public square between the station and landing stage is largely occupied by a turntable used by the railway to access its lakeside depot.

Since of the closure of the section from Arth, the Arth–Rigi railway now commences on platforms above, and at right-angles to, the main line platforms of Arth-Goldau station. The lines depot lies to the south of the station, where a link track connects the mountain railway with the main line.

Both railways share a common terminal station at Rigi Kulm, although the two tracks are not linked in the station, and the two lines to Rigi Staffelhöhe follow slightly different routes. Each railway has a single stub track and platform.

=== Passing points ===
The Arth–Rigi line is single line with passing points in some of the stations. In order from Arth-Goldau these are Krabel, where there is a connection with the Rigi Scheidegg cablecar, Fruttli, Klosterli and Staffel. On the Vitznau–Rigi line there is only one passing section, a long section of double track from Freibergen to just below the station at Rigi Kaltbad.

At Staffel there is the only track connection between the two railways. This involves a single line leaving the Vitznau–Rigi line below the station and running parallel to its own line until it joins the passing loop of the Arth–Rigi line. The connecting track is also used for stabling stock between services.

=== Locomotives, railcars and rolling stock ===
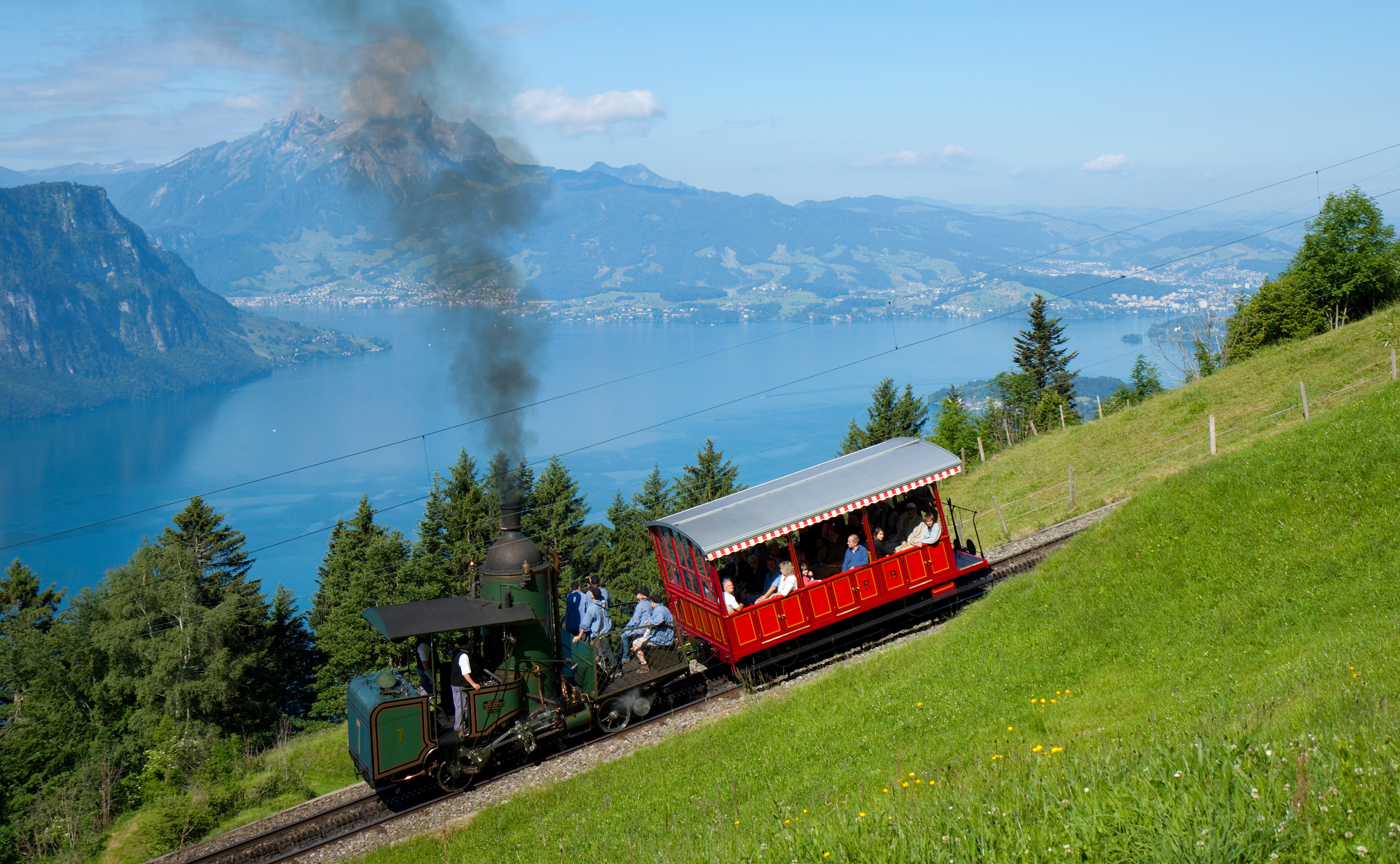
Locomotive nr 7 of the Vitznau-Rigi-Bahn, climbing Mount Rigi

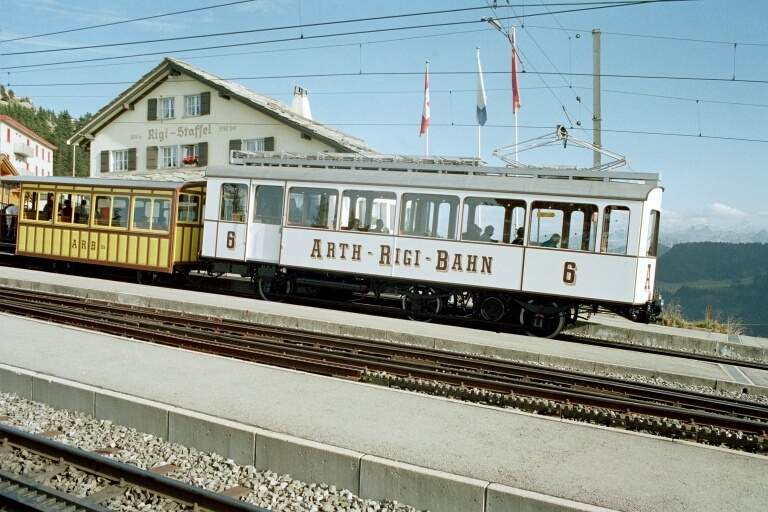
Railcar 6, from 1911, with coach 35, from 1899

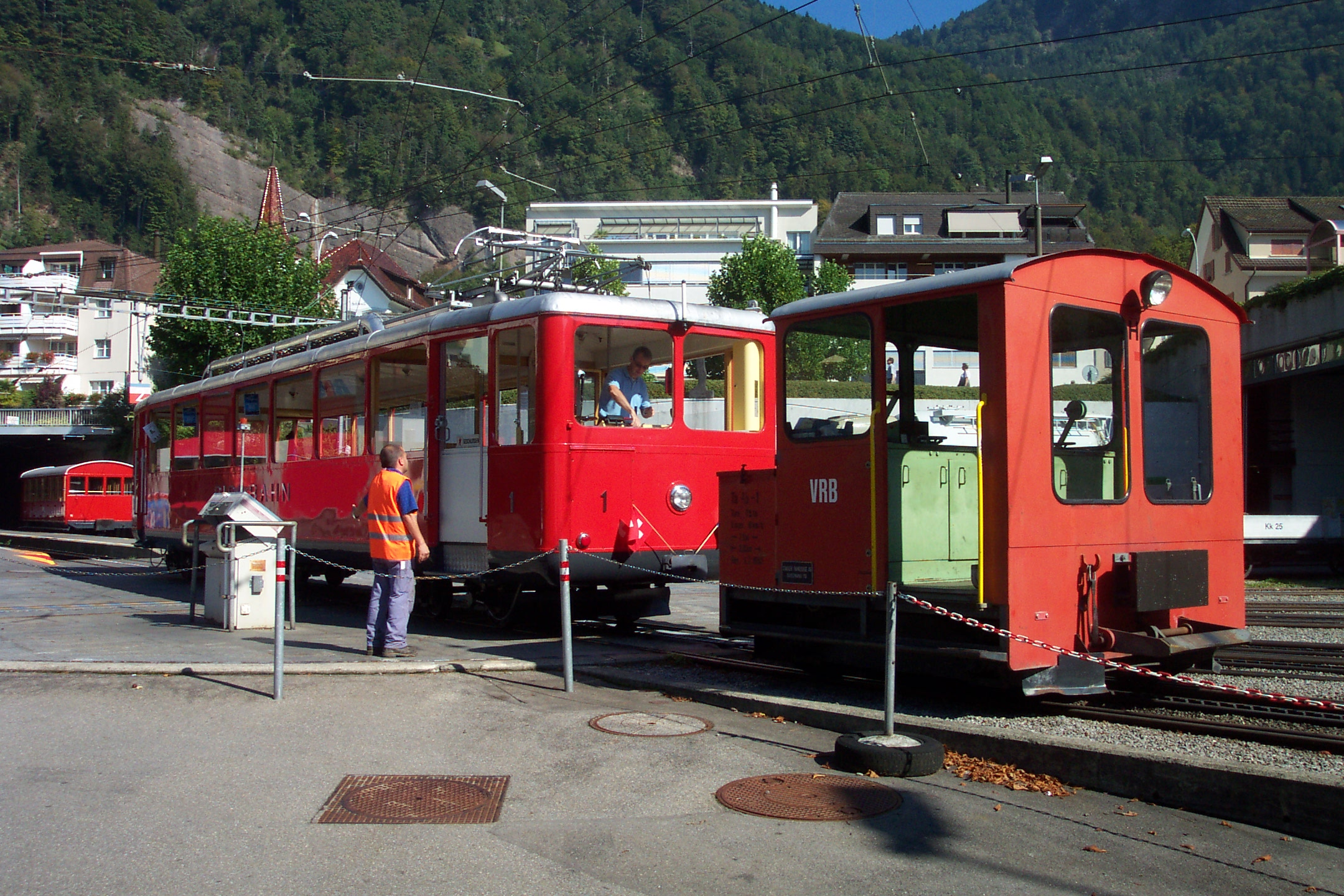
VRB railcar 1, dating from 1937, and the battery-electric locomotive, on the turntable at the Vitznau terminus

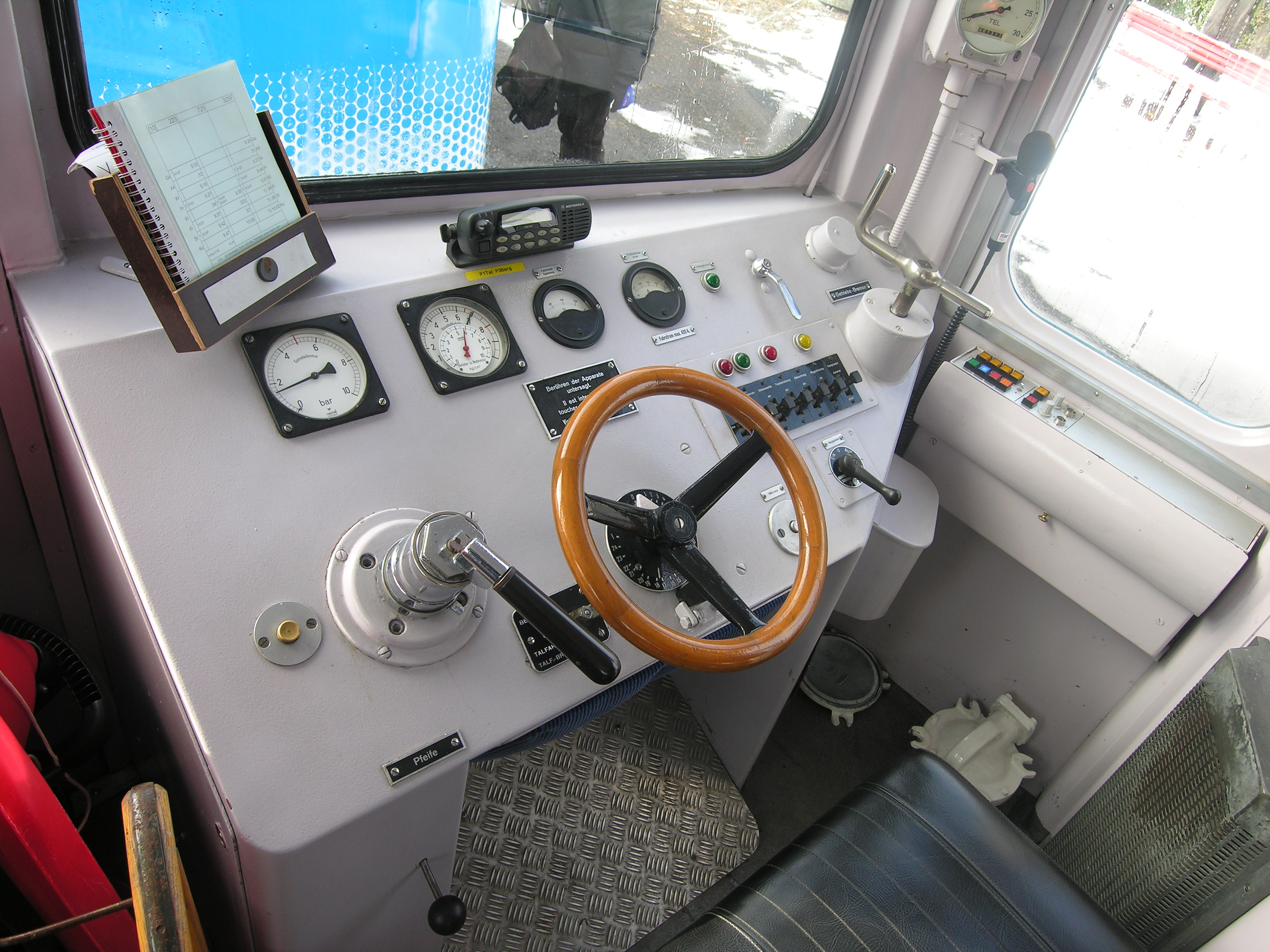
The driver's workplace in Rigi cogwheel electric train

The line operates two steam locomotives, No's 16, (SLM No.2871, built 1923) (See photograph above) and 17, (SLM No.3043, built 1925). They are painted in a dark green livery, lined red. They also have three electric locomotives, a Stadler built battery operated class Ta 2/2 in red livery, which carries the identification VRB 1, and usually to be found shunting at Vitznau, a class He 2/3, built in 1930 by SLM / MFO, in orange and numbered 8, which is the Arth snowplough locomotive, and a further class He 2/2, in red livery and numbered 18, built by SLM in 1938 and which is usually based at Vitznau.

The railcars, class Bhe 2/4, are painted in a red livery for operation on the Vitznau section. Numbered 1 - 3 (incl) they were products of SLM / BBC, and introduced with the electrification of the line in 1937. Because the three railcars weren't enough to completely replace the slower steam trains a fourth railcar of the same series as the first three was bought in 1953. It received a bigger cargo hold and was classified as BDhe 2/4 and got the number 4.

To add to the passenger carrying capabilities of the line even more a class BDhe 4/4 from the same makers arrived in 1964 and, again from SLM / BBC, in 1986 two railcars (BDhe 4/4), numbered 21 and 22, arrived with single end driving trailers (Bt) numbered 31 and 32 which were nearly identical as the railcar 15. Although the railcars are capable of working as single units they are normally to be found working with the trailers.

On the Arth section class BDhe 2/4 railcars, built by SLM / SAAS and numbered 11 and 12 arrived in 1949, being joined by No.13 in 1954 and No.14 in 1967. These were joined by class BDhe 4/4 No.15 in 1982. Class Bt driving trailers followed the railcars, No.21 and 22 in 1958, No.23 in 1960 and Nos. 24 and 25 with the railcars in 1967 and 1982 respectively. These vehicles are liveried in blue/white. It is common, on light traffic days, for the railcars to operate without trailers.

The drivers control cab, in some older railcars, is not separated from the passenger section.

The line also has a collection of historic coaches and those for special use. The most usual use for these vehicles is with the steam locomotive, where the train usually consists of three coaches.

Class BDhe 2/3, Railcar No.6, is the world's oldest cogwheel-railcar which dates from 1911. Working with yellow liveried coach, class B2, No.35, built in 1899, this forms the Rigi Pullman train. There are upholstered seats for passengers who like comfort, wooden benches for the more hardy and a standing bar for those who can remain steady on their feet. The bar is staffed by hostesses dressed in outfits dating from its construction.

The line is also home to another early example in Railcar No.7, a 1925 built BDhe 2/4 built by SIG / SLM / MFO. This works from Arth, frequently with a coach, or in the wintertime, the toboggan wagon.

== See also ==
- List of mountain railways in Switzerland
- List of heritage railways and funiculars in Switzerland
