= Niklaus Riggenbach =

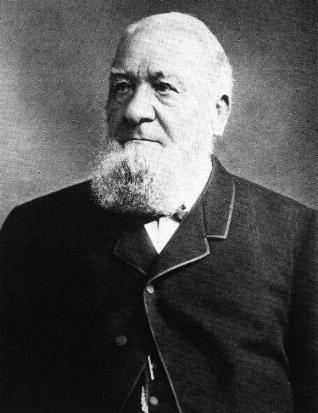

Member of Cantonal Council of Solothurn
- In office 1866–1868
- Constituency: Olten District

Personal details
- Born: Niklaus Riggenbach; 21 May 1817 Guebwiller, Kingdom of France (now France)
- Died: 25 July 1899 (aged 82) Olten, Switzerland
- Spouse: Emma Socin (m. 1847; died 1899)
- Children: 1
- Education: Conservatoire national des arts et métiers
- Occupation: Railway pioneer; engineer; mechanic; politician
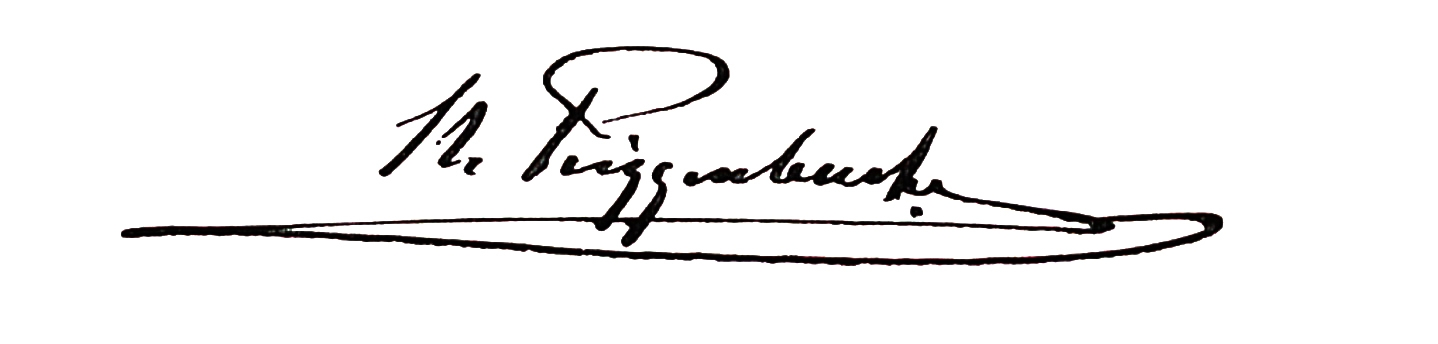
- Signature

Niklaus Riggenbach (21 May 1817 – 25 July 1899) was an Alsatian-born Swiss mechanic, railway engineer, politician and inventor of the rack railway system as well as the counter-pressure brake. Riggenbach was primarily known for introducing his railway system and using it within the tourism industry such as on the Rigi, Pilatus or even on the Nilgiri Mountain Railway in India. In 1878 he was the recipient of a gold medal at the World Exhibition in Paris. He served on the Cantonal Council of Solothurn from 1866 to 1868.

== Early life and education ==
Riggenbach was born in Guebwiller, Kingdom of France to Nikolaus Riggenbach who originally hailed from Rünenberg, Switzerland. His father emigrated there and built a fortune by opening a Sugar Beet Refinery. After the death of his father, his mother returned to Basel with her eight young children. At age 16 Riggenbach began an apprenticeship as a mechanic, going abroad after completing his training.

== Career ==
In 1837 he found his way to Paris, where he accepted employment. By taking technical courses in night school, he acquired considerable knowledge in mathematics and physics. With the opening of the Paris-St. Germain railroad line in 1839 he found his vocation to build locomotives.

In June 1840 he moved to Karlsruhe, Germany, and found employment in the machine works of Emil Kessler. Here he soon rose to managing director and was involved in the construction of no less than 150 locomotives. One of these steam engines was the "Limmat" of the Schweizerischen Nordbahn (Swiss Northern Railway), opened on 9 August 1847, also called the Spanisch-Brötli line, which he ferried to Switzerland in order to test it on the Zürich-Baden line.

As construction of the Basel-Olten line began in 1853, the board of directors of the Schweizer Centralbahn Gesellschaft (Swiss Central Rail Association) appointed him chief of the machine works. He made several official trips to England and Austria, and crawled under a fair number of steam locomotives and into their boilers, "to make the good even better." Various improvements in railroading bear his name. In 1856 he became a master machinist and boss of the new main workshop of the Centralbahn in Olten. Under his direction this workshop evolved into a full-fledged engine works, building the company's own locomotives and bridges.

Track grip (adhesion) on the Hauenstein line caused him concern. The difficulties led Riggenbach to the concept of the rack railway. After many attempts he discovered that one could negotiate steeper stretches of track by bolting a rack between the rails, which a toothed wheel or cog on the underside of the locomotive could engage. He built his first locomotive in 1862, and on 12 August 1863 France awarded him Patent No. 59625 for the invention. The Vitznau-Rigi line was inaugurated in 1871 as the first mountain railway to use the Riggenbach system in Europe. The locomotives were equipped with his counter-pressure braking system.

== Personal life ==
In 1847, he married Emma Socin, who originally hailed from Basel. They had one son, Bernhard Riggenbach (1848-1895), who died aged 47 only four years prior to his own death.

== See also ==
- Steep grade railway

== Sources ==
Niklaus Riggenbach
