= Vitznau–Rigi railway line =

Railway line in Switzerland

Vitznau–Rigi
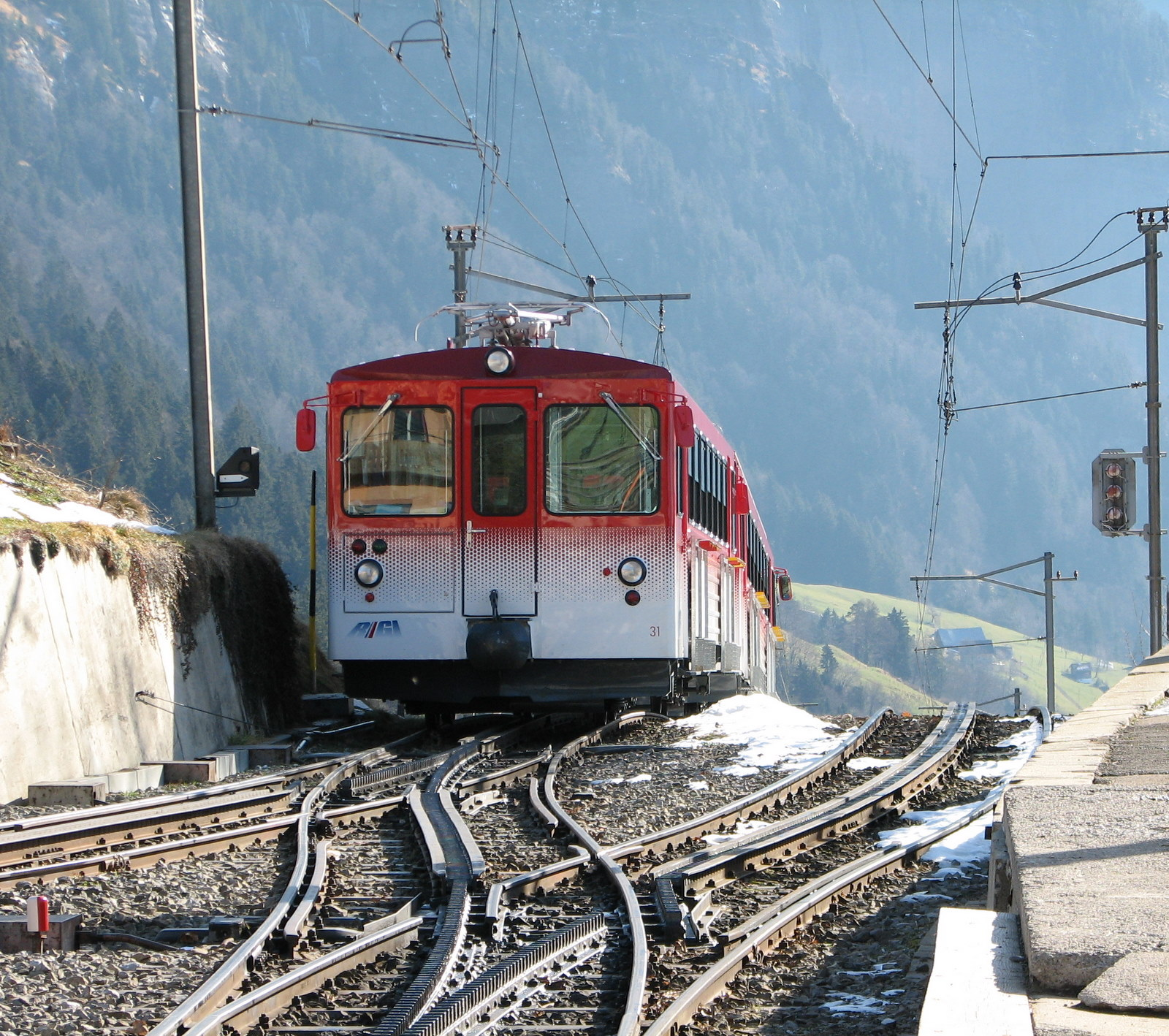
- A cogwheel train on its way to the top of Rigi in Switzerland

Overview
- Owner: Rigi Railways
- Line number: 603
- Termini: Vitznau; Rigi

Technical
- Line length: 6.975 km (4.334 mi)
- Number of tracks: 1 or 2
- Rack system: Riggenbach
- Track gauge: 1,435 mm (4 ft 8 1/2 in) standard gauge
- Minimum radius: 60 m (200 ft)
- Electrification: 1500 V DC
- Maximum incline: 25.0%

The Vitznau–Rigi railway line is a Swiss standard gauge rack railway that runs from Vitznau on the shore of Lake Lucerne to Rigi. It was built in 1871 by the Rigibahn, and is now owned by Rigi Railways, along with the Arth–Rigi railway line, which runs on the other side of the mountain, and the Weggis–Rigi Kaltbad cable car (Luftseilbahn Weggis–Rigi Kaltbad, LWRK).

== History ==
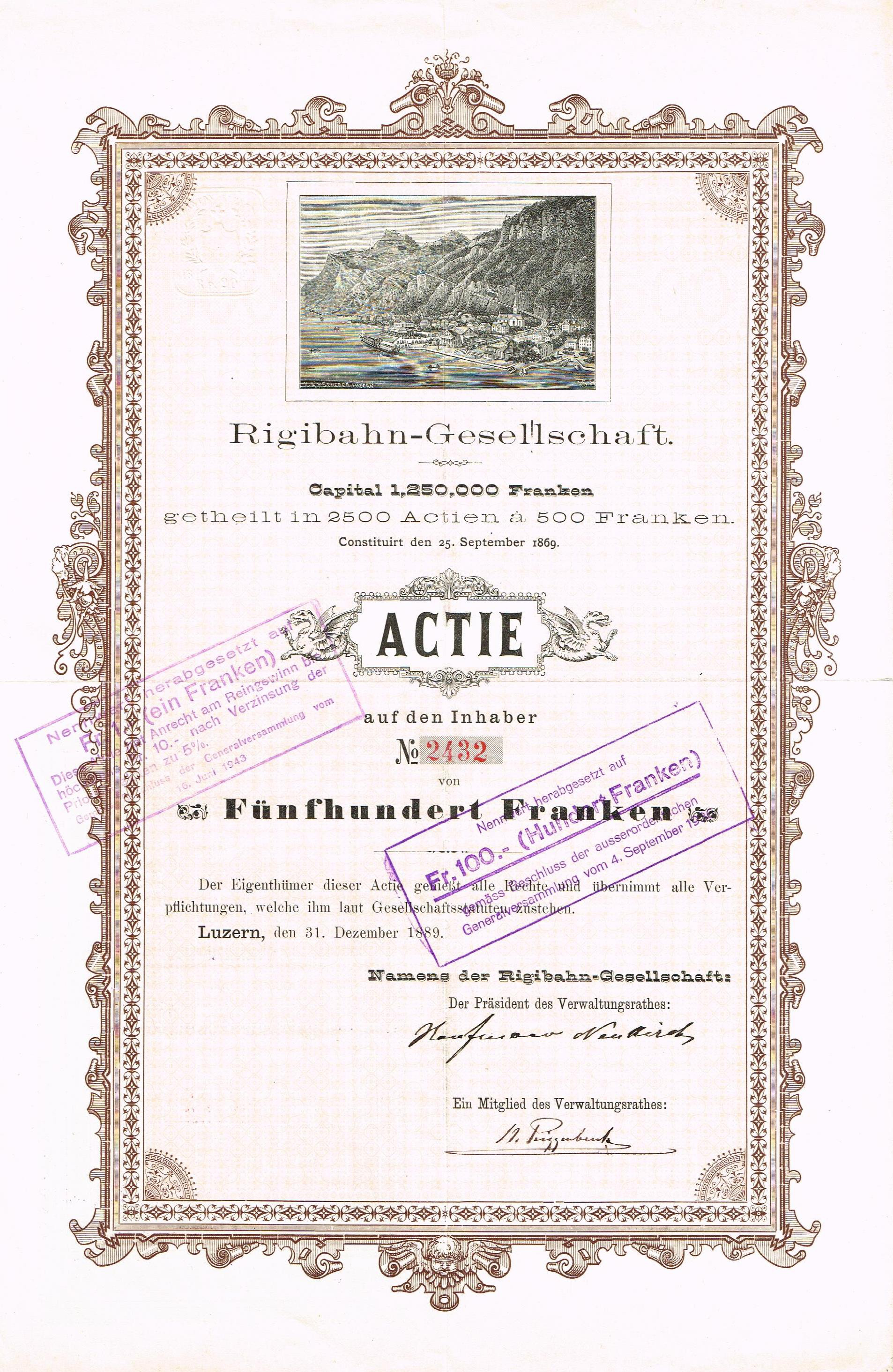
Share worth 500 francs in the Rigibahn-Gesellschaft of 31 December 1889

The Vitznau–Rigi railway (VRB) was opened on 21 May 1871 as the Rigibahn and the first mountain railway in Europe. The first rack railway of Europe had already been opened in the quarry of Ostermundigen in 1870. The quarry was officially opened for marketing reasons only in October 1871. The Vitznau–Rigi Railway was built by the engineers Niklaus Riggenbach, Ferdinand Adolf Naeff and Olivier Zschokke. At first it ran only from Vitznau (439 metres (1,440 ft) above sea level) via Kaltbad (1,453 metres (4,767 ft) ASL) to Rigi Staffelhöhe (1,550 metres (5,090 ft) ASL). On 27 June 1873, (Note: The date 23 June 1873 frequently quoted contradicts the fact that the Federal Council did not authorise the railway company's board of directors to hand over the section of track for public operations until its meeting of 25 June 1873. – see: "Tages-Courrier. (…) Zur Lage. (…) Eidgenossenschaft. Bundesrathsverhandlungen". Intelligenzblatt für die Stadt Bern (in German). 26 June 1873. p. supplement, 5, middle. Archived from the original on 25 September 2017.) the railway was extended to Rigi Kulm (1,752 metres (5,748 ft) ASL). This section is located in the canton of Schwyz, for which the VRB had no concession. The track belonged to the ARB and was leased by the VRB. The line is mostly single track, but has been double-track since 1874 from the request stop of Freibergen to Rigi Kaltbad-First.

The Rigibahn was only open in the summer in the early years. Winter sports gradually developed and operations in the winter commenced.

The narrow-gauge Rigi–Scheidegg railway (Rigi-Kaltbad-Scheidegg-Bahn, RSB) to Rigi Scheidegg, which was completed in 1875, began in Kaltbad. This railway was closed in 1931 and finally abandoned in 1942. The Weggis–Rigi Kaltbad cable car (Luftseilbahn Weggis–Rigi Kaltbad, LWRK) from Weggis, also operated by the Rigi Railways, ended service in Kaltbad in 1968.

The Vitznau–Rigi Railway (officially called the Vitznau-Rigi-Bahn since 1 January 1970) connects in Rigi Staffel with the tracks of the Arth–Rigi railway line, which has operated from Arth-Goldau since 1875. The VRB used a track that ran parallel with the track of the ARB to the common terminus in Rigi Kulm. Both railways were once strictly separated and competitors. The only connection was a transfer table in front of the joint depot building on Rigi Kulm. It was not until 1990 that a connecting track was built between the ARB and the VRB in Rigi Staffel. This was the beginning of the merger, which was completed in 1992.

The VRB switched to electric traction in 1937 and an overhead line was erected on the Vitznau–Rigi Kulm line. The traverser in Freibergen was replaced by a rack railway set of points in 1959; the same occurred in Kaltbad in 1961. These sets of points were replaced by new systems in 2000 and 2012. In 2012, the station complex in Kaltbad was completely renewed and a second platform track was installed. The station building in Kaltbad was demolished; construction of the new building started in May 2014 and was finished in September 2014. The new Kaltbad station building was inaugurated on 1 March 2015.

== Technical data ==
The railway has the following technical data:

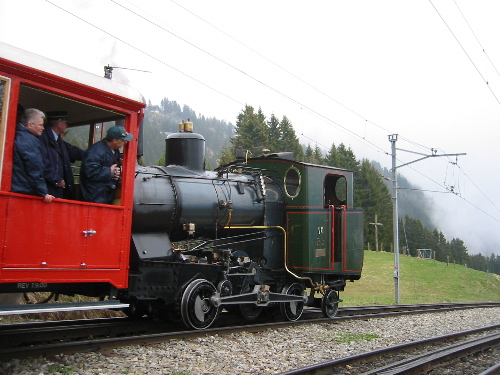
Steam locomotive in Rigi-Kaltbad

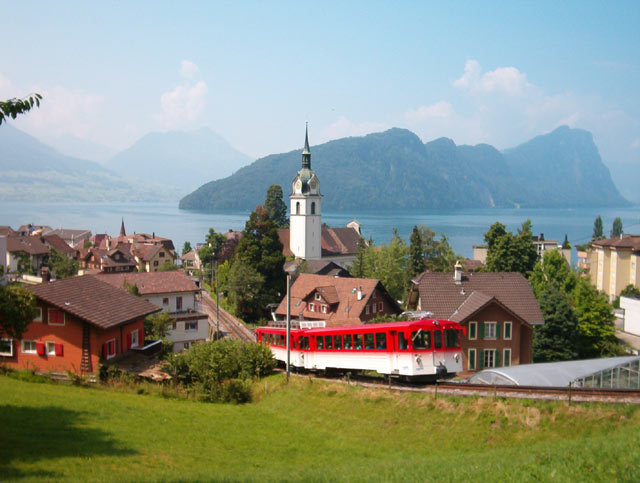
VRB train shortly after Vitznau

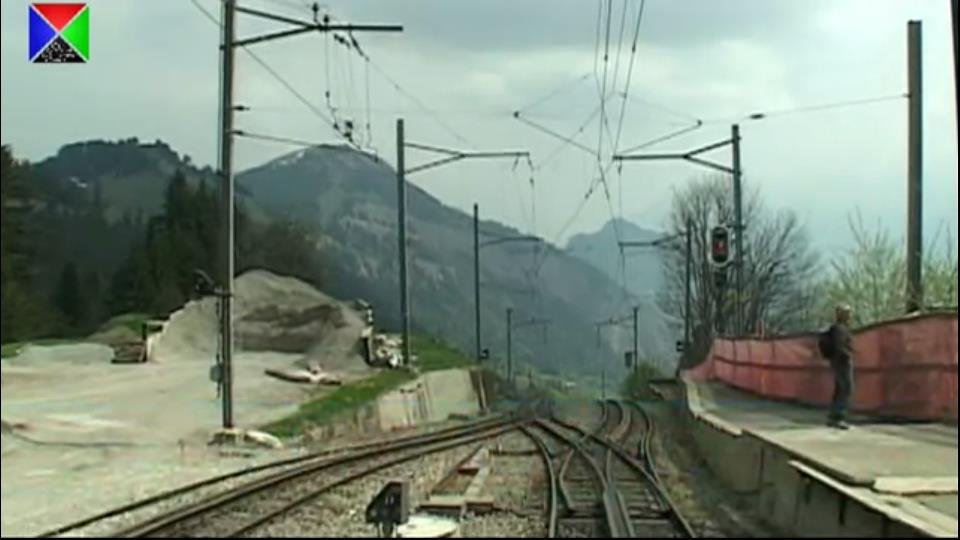
Vitznau–Rigi railway points in Kaltbad, state sometime before 2012

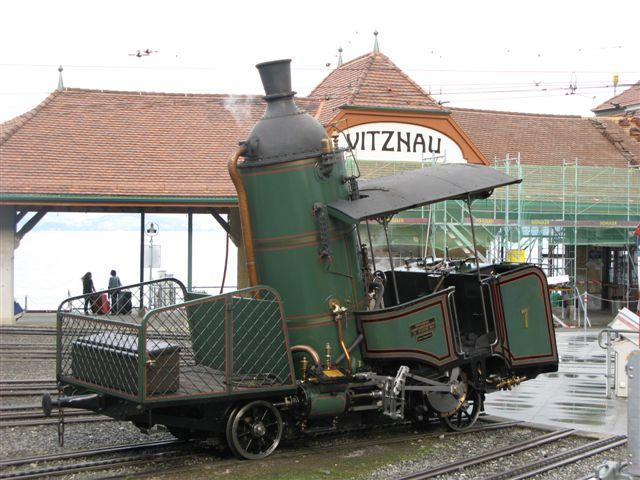
Vitznau Rigi Bahn steam locomotive of the Riggenbach rack system

=== Electrical system ===
Introduction of electrical operation	3 October 1937
Equipment for electrical operation:	3 rectifier plants
Supply of three-phase current:	15 kV/50 Hz
DC voltage:	1,500 V
Power of the rectifier stations:	4,000 kW

=== Speed ===
Steam locomotives	9 km/h
Ascent:	18/23 km/h
Descent:	12/14 km/h
Vitznau–Rigi Kulm travel time:	30 minutes
Capacity:	about 850 people/

== Rolling stock ==
- 1 electric locomotive of 331 kW (no. 18)
- 4 electric motor cars of 330 kW (no. 1–4)
- 1 electric motor cars of 752 kW (no. 5)
- 2 electric push-pull sets of 824 kW (no. 21–22)
- 1 snow plough of 309 kW (not self-propelled)
- 2 steam locomotives of 340 kW (no. 16–17)
- 9 passenger cars
- 13 freight wagons, official vehicles, snow ploughs etc.
