= Manisch =

Manisch refers either to a dialect of Rotwelsch (especially in the vicinity of greater Gießen, Germany) or a speaker thereof (plural: Manische or Manen). The term Manisch however, is also understood primarily throughout much of the German state of Hesse and parts of the Rhineland-Palatinate (German: Rheinland-Pfalz) to refer to the Manisch/Jenisch (alternatively "gypsy") elements of their vernacular. Several words are recognisably derived from Yiddish (e.g. malocho, "work") or Romany (e.g. pani, "water").

== Manisch in Gießen ==
=== Select glossary of the Gießen Manisch dialect ===
| German | Manisch | English |
|---|---|---|
| aber sicher! | aweles! | for sure! |
| acht | ochte | eight |
| alt | puri | old |
| Arbeit | maloche | work |
| Arm | mussi | arm |
| Baum | ruck | tree |
| beobachten | spannen | observe |
| Bier | lawine | beer |
| Blödsinn | stuß | drivel |
| Brille | nagewelo | glasses |
| Brot | maro | bread |
| Brötchen | ballemari | roll |
| Dame | tschuwel | lady |
| Dirne | lupni | whore |
| Drei | trin | three |
| Dumm | dinnelich | dumb |
| eins | jäck | one |
| Fahrrad | welo | bicycle |
| Ficken | buijen | to screw |
| Franzose | walltscho | Frenchman |
| Fräulein | moss | young lady |
| Friseur | ballefusser | barber |
| geben | dehlen | to give |
| Geld | lowi | money |
| Gesindel | mischpoche | riff-raff |
| Gott | dewel | God |
| Gut | latscho | good |
| Haar | balle | hair |
| Hexe | tschowachani | witch |
| ist | bescht | is |
| ja | awe | yes |
| Jude | boboldo | Jew |
| Kein | tschü | no / none |
| Kerl | gardsch | fellow |
| Kerl (liederlich) | kluntegardsch | man (loose) |
| Lehrer | siegebaskero | teacher |
| Lügner | kochebasgero | liar |
| machen | kären | make / do |
| Messer | tschuri | knife |
| Milch | tut | milk |
| Namen | lab | name |
| Nase | nag | nose |
| neun | enje | nine |
| Ohr | kant | ear |
| Penis | gari | penis |
| Prostituierte | kluntemoss | prostitute |
| reden | pennen | to talk |
| rot | loli | red |
| richtig | tschatcho | correct |
| Sack | gono | sack |
| schlau | kochem | smart |
| Schmand | schmentana | sour cream |
| Schule | siegebaskeri | school |
| Toilette | tschundekär | toilet |
| trinken | schwächen | to drink |
| Unrat | fuhl | refuse |
| Vulva | minsch | vulva |
| Wasser | pani | water |
| Wetter | tsiro | weather |
| wir | amos | we |
| zehn | desch | ten |
| Zigarette | pimangelo | cigarette |
| zu | banedi | closed |
| Zwiebel | burme | onion |

== See also ==
- Lotegorisch
- Manush
- Rotwelsch
