= Kesslerloch =

Cave in Switzerland

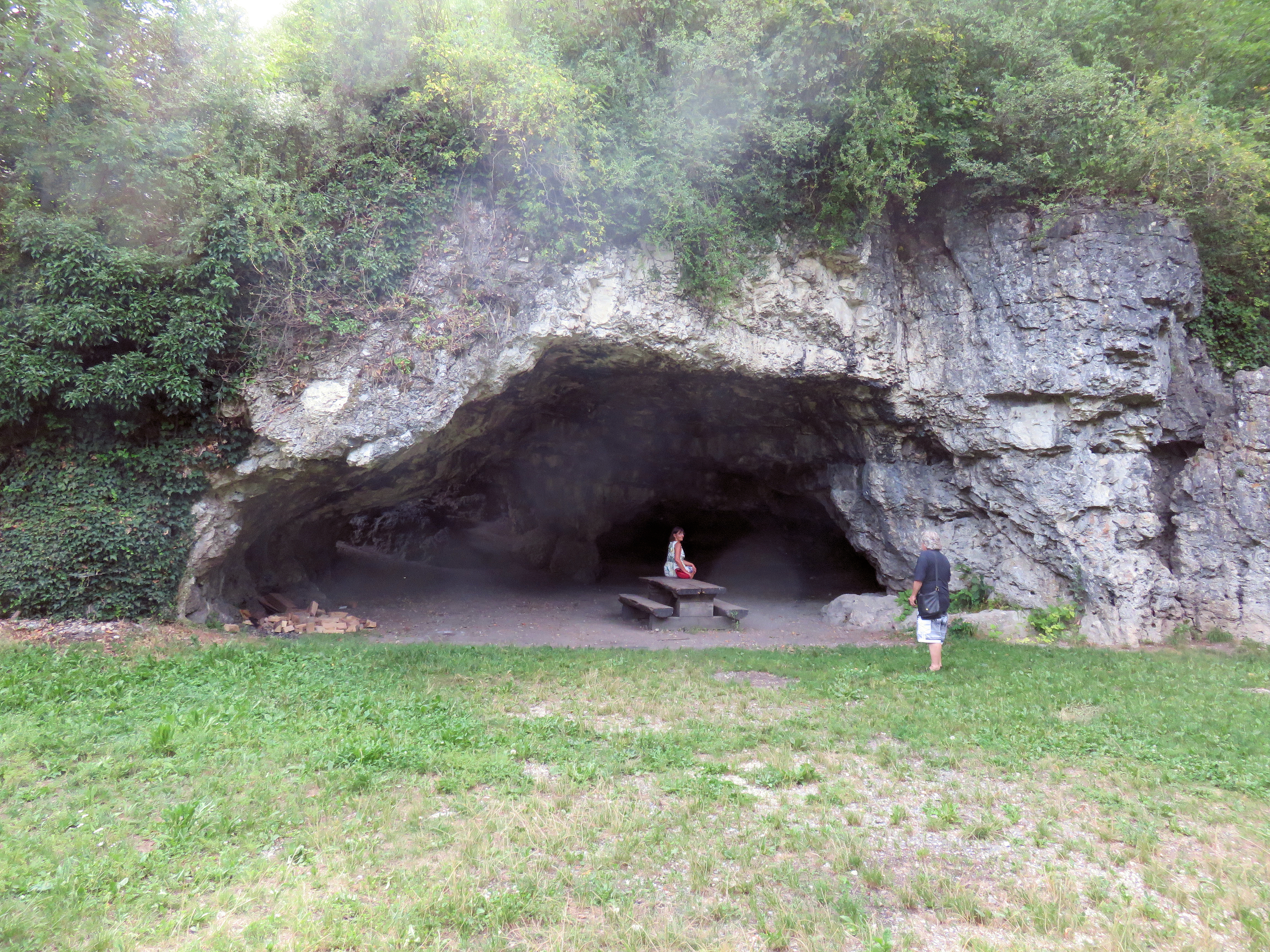
- Kesslerloch near Thayngen in July 2019

- Location within Switzerland Location within Canton of Schaffhausen
- Location: Thayngen; Canton of Schaffhausen; Switzerland
- Coordinates: 47°44′44.9124″N 8°41′40.218″E
- Elevation: 400 m (1,300 ft)
- Entrances: 1
- Access: Public
- Website: Naturpark Schaffhausen (in German)

The Kesslerloch is a cave near Thayngen in the canton of Schaffhausen in Switzerland. Located in the Herblingertal valley at the south-eastern foot of the Reiat plateau, the cave is approximately 200 m^{2} (2,200 sq ft) in size and divided by a stone pillar.

In prehistoric times, reindeer hunters likely used it as a shelter during the summer months between 15,000 and 11,000 years ago (Upper Palaeolithic, Magdalenian culture). Its position in a narrow valley was advantageous for a hunting station, similar to the nearby Petersfels (approximately 15 km [9.3 mi] northeast) near Engen.

The cave, along with surrounding forest land and meadows, was placed under state protection in 1902.

== Excavation work ==
On 4 December 1873, secondary school teacher Konrad Merk (1846–1914) conducted the first excavation in the Kesslerloch cave with his colleague D. Wepf and two students. A year later, he carried out further excavations. The results were published in 1875 in the Mitteilungen der Antiquarischen Gesellschaft Zürich. Jakob Nüesch, who discovered the Schweizersbild cave in 1894, conducted additional excavations in 1893, 1898, and 1899, followed by Jakob Heierli in 1902 and 1903. The final excavation took place in 1980.

Initial finds were poorly documented, with some exchanged or sold among excavators. Ludwig Leiner acquired the finds from the first excavation in 1875 for the Rosgarten Museum in Konstanz, which he founded, where the 'Searching Reindeer' is now exhibited.

Two engravings of a fox and a bear were later identified as forgeries: in 1875, assistant excavator Martin Stamm commissioned his nephew Konrad Bollinger to engrave the animals on a bone, based on a template from the book Die Thiergärten und Menagerien mit ihren Insassen.

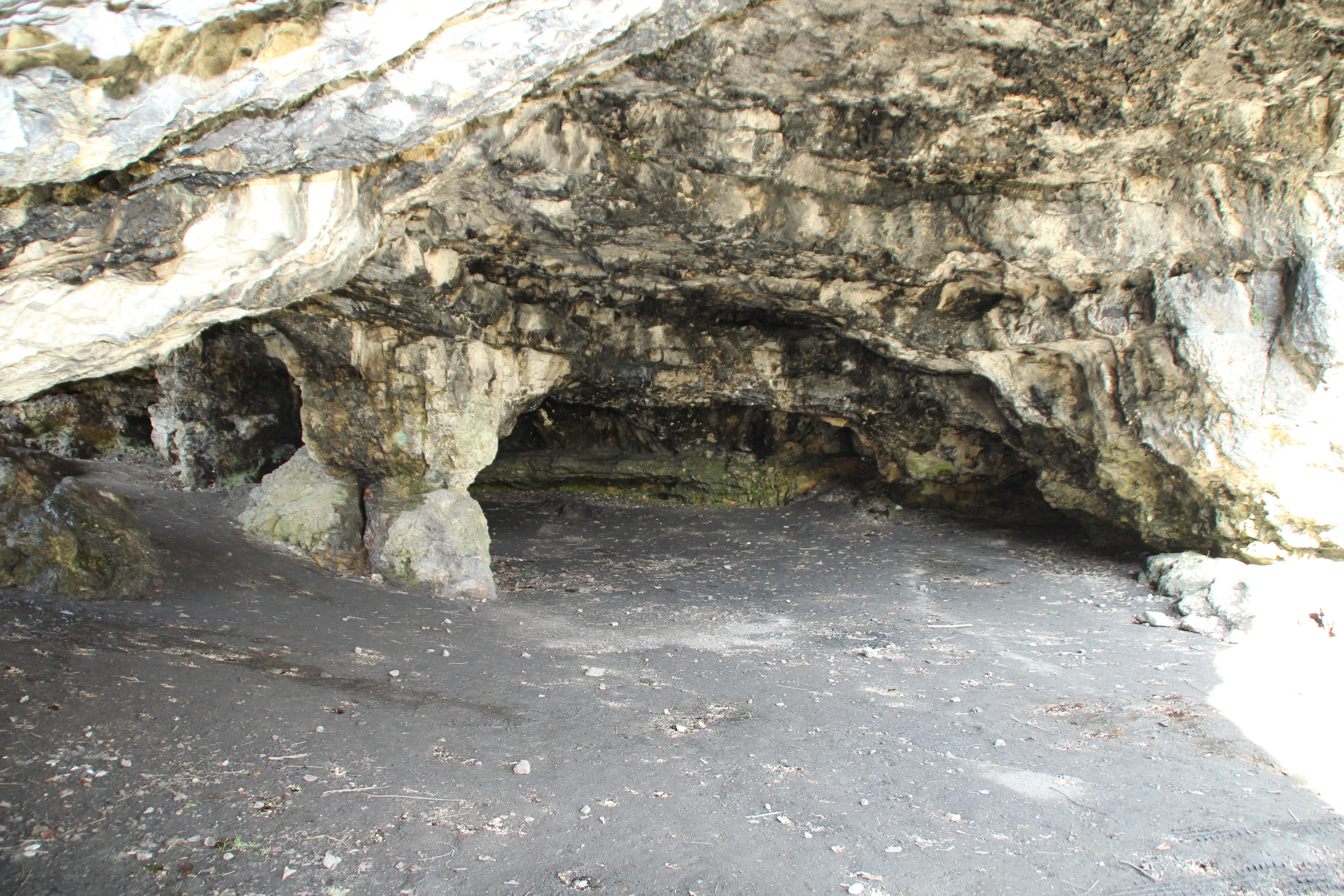
Interior

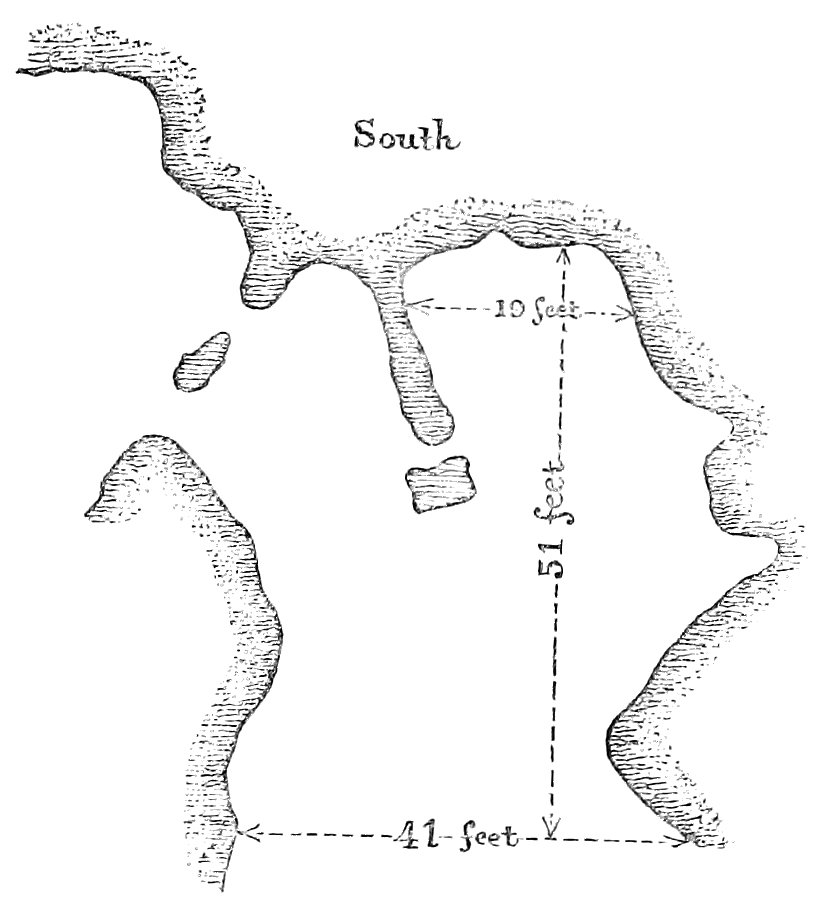
Plan

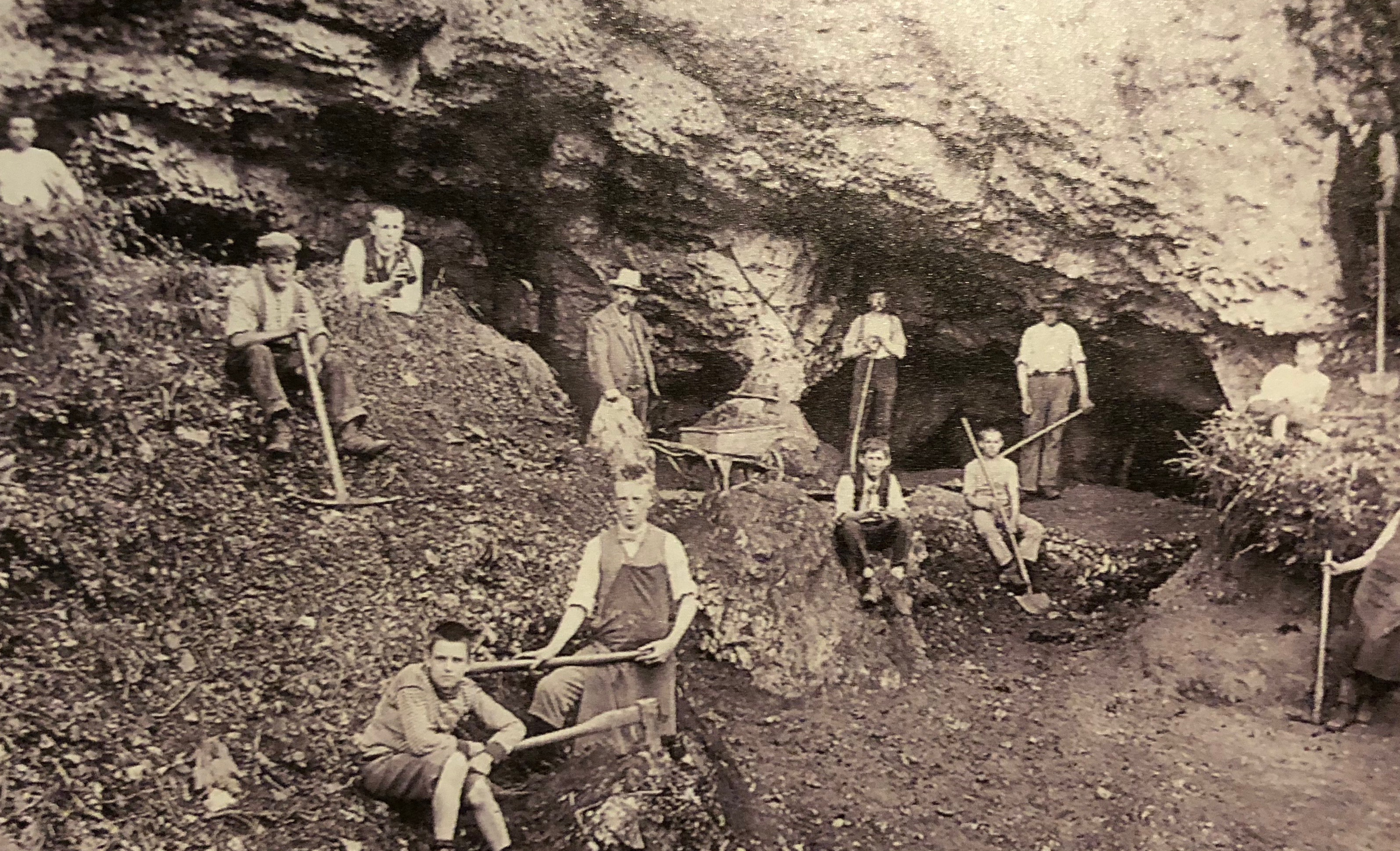
Excavations by Jakob Heierli

== Finds ==
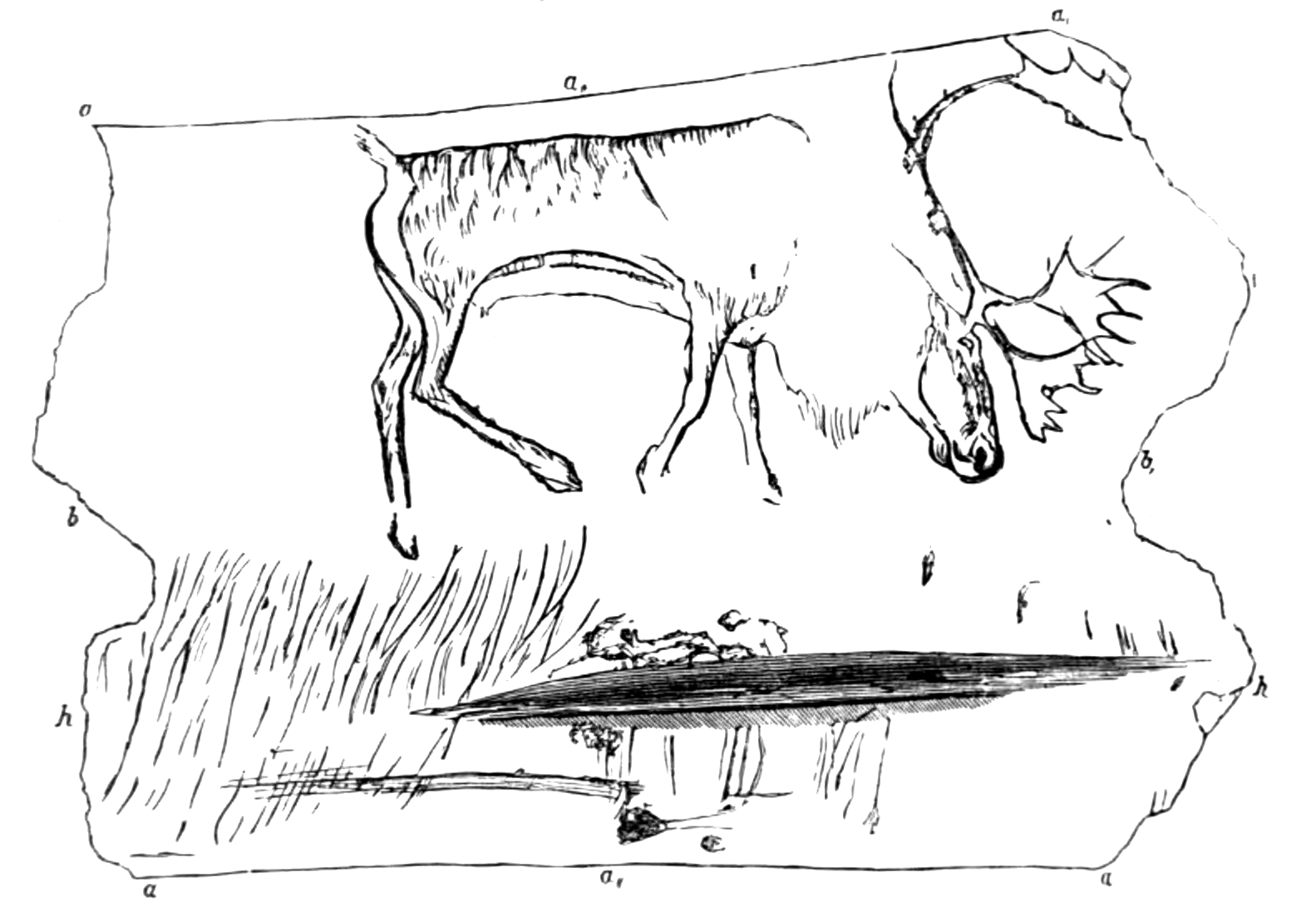
Reindeer carving

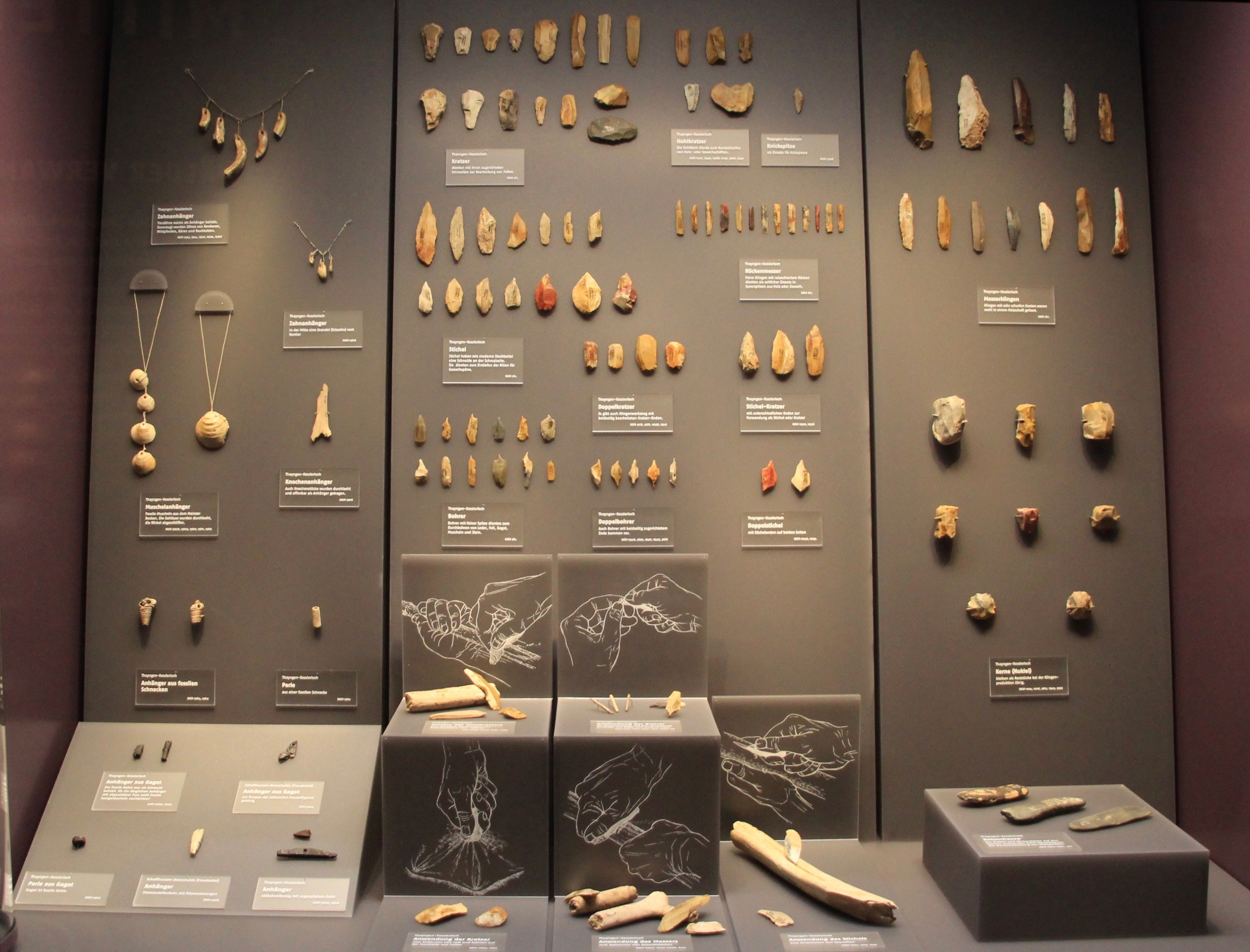
Finds from the Kesslerloch in the Museum zu Allerheiligen Schaffhausen

Excavations uncovered bones from 53 animal species, including mammoths, reindeer, woolly rhinoceroses, ibexes, and chamois. No human bones were found. Stone tools made from local flint, approximately 200 projectile points, and tools and implements crafted from antlers, bones, and ivory were also discovered. A piece of a domestic dog's upper jaw, found in 1874, was dated to between 14,100 and 14,600 years old, making it one of the earliest pieces of evidence for the domestication of the wolf in Central Europe.

The Kesslerloch gained fame for small artworks, such as pendants and perforated rods. As many researchers initially doubted that Stone Age people could produce art, these finds caused a sensation. The most notable is the engraving of the "Searching Reindeer" (previously called "Grazing Reindeer") on a reindeer antler fragment, likely part of a perforated rod, discovered by geologist Albert Heim in the presence of Jakob Messikommer on 4 January 1874. Other finds include the Venus of Kesslerloch and jewellery made from shells, pitch coal, snails, and animal teeth.

Due to a series of unfortunate circumstances, two reproductions of a fox and a bear, now easily recognisable as crude forgeries, were included in Merk's discovery report. Ludwig Lindenschmidt identified them as copies from a contemporary children's book.

== Exhibitions ==
Finds from the Kesslerloch are displayed at the Museum zu Allerheiligen in Schaffhausen. The diorama of the Kesslerloch, developed in 1939 by museum technician Hans Wanner in collaboration with German stage designer Juri Richter, was a milestone in museum design, though it no longer reflects the latest scientific research.

The perforated rod with the 'Searching Reindeer' is held by the Rosgarten Museum in Konstanz. A copy is displayed, while the original is kept in a safe. Additional copies are exhibited at the Museum zu Allerheiligen and the Swiss National Museum in Zurich, where other finds are also showcased.

== Origin of the name ==
The cave's name derives from the Jenisch people (formerly known as Kessler in eastern Switzerland, a surname still common today), who in early modern times collected pots and other cooking utensils in surrounding communities, repaired them in the cave, and sold them again. According to Konrad Merk's research report, itinerant Jenisch families found shelter in the cave as late as the early 19th century.

== See also ==
- List of caves in Switzerland
- Paleolithic in Switzerland
