= Yenish =

Yenish or Yeniche or Jenische may refer to:

- Yenish people
- Yenish language
