= Fog in August (novel) =

2008 novel by Robert Domes

- 2008 German language edition, Nebel im August
- Author: Robert Domes
- Original title: Nebel im August
- Language: German
- Genre: Children's novel
- Publisher: Random House
- Publication date: 2008

Fog in August (in German Nebel im August) is a 2008 novel by Robert Domes. The story revolves around a 14-year-old Yenish boy Ernst Lossa who was killed through euthanasia by Nazis.

== Subject ==
In 2002, Domes began studying the life of Ernst Lossa, a nomad boy of Yenish ethnicity who traveled to southern Germany. Ernst was separated from his parents in 1933, was deemed an orphan and was first sent to the orphanage in 1942, then transferred to a borstal and finally to an asylum at the age of twelve. There he was killed in 1944 at the age of 14 with an overdose of morphine and scopolamine. He was one of at least 200,000 victims of the child euthanasia program under National-socialism.

Domes described Ernst Lossa's life in this novel, which was published by CBT (Random House) in 2008 as a children's book. Currently introduced as a reading in schools, the book has received numerous awards.

In 2016, a film adaptation was made directed by the German director Kai Wessel. The drama Fog in August was released in German theaters in September 2016. It was one of the 8 German films submitted to Academy Award for Best International Feature Film in 2017, but was not selected.

== Bibliography ==
- Robert Domes (2017). Nebbia in agosto. La vera storia di Ernst Lossa. Translated by Anna Carbone e Cristina Proto. Mondadori. ISBN 9788852078644.
