= Fog in August =

2016 German drama film by Kai Wessel

- Film poster
- Directed by: Kai Wessel
- Written by: Robert Domes; Holger Karsten Schmidt
- Starring: Sebastian Koch
- Music by: Martin Todsharow
- Production companies: Constantin Film; Collina Filmproduktion
- Distributed by: StudioCanal
- Release date: 29 September 2016
- Country: Germany
- Language: German

Fog in August (German: Nebel im August) is a 2016 German drama film directed by Kai Wessel. It is based on the 2008 novel Fog in August by Robert Domes, and is inspired by the documented true story of the 14 year old Yenish boy Ernst Lossa (1929–1944). It was listed as one of eight films that could be the German submission for the Best Foreign Language Film at the 89th Academy Awards, but it was not selected.

== Plot ==
In Nazi Germany in 1944, a Yenish boy named Ernst Lossa is transferred to a mental institution, where he labors under the watch of Dr. Veithausen. Ernst, initially identified as a troublemaker, lives up to his role and frequently rebels in minor ways. He does not plan to stay in the institution long, but expects to be taken home (and eventually to America) by his father, Christian Lossa, but is denied discharge based on the fact that his father has no permanent address after being released from a concentration camp.

Initially, certain patients in the hospital are marked to be sent to the Hadamar Killing Facility to be murdered, but central authorities dictate that the 'euthanasia' operation and decisions be transferred to individual institutions, leaving Dr. Veithausen to direct his nurses to kill patients under their care. The newly hired nurse, Sister Kiefer, has transferred from Hadamar and is willing to exterminate child patients using barbiturates. Meanwhile Sister Sophia tries to protect the children from being poisoned.

Ernst befriends Nandl, a fellow patient, and over time they become aware of Dr. Veithausen's plans to murder the patients in the institution. He attempts to work out an escape plan to save Nandl and himself. The doctor, following the logic of racial hygiene, devises a plan to starve patients slowly by feeding them boiled vegetable soup with all nutrients removed, which satisfies his Nazi superiors. Not long after, Ernst plans his escape during an air raid, but he fails when a bomb drops nearby and the falling debris injures Nandl and kills Sister Sophia. After the nurse's funeral, Ernst accuses Veithausen of being a murderer.

Dr. Veithausen calls for Ernst's death, which is carried out by either Paul Hechtle or Sister Kiefer (both deny being the killer). Nandl breaks the news to the other patients by claiming that Ernst has finally made it to America.

== Cast ==
- Ivo Pietzcker as Ernst Lossa
- Sebastian Koch as Dr. Werner Veithausen
- Thomas Schubert as Paul Hechtle
- Fritzi Haberlandt as Sister Oberschwester Sophia
- Henriette Confurius Sister Edith Kiefer
- Karl Markovics as Christian Lossa
- Branko Samarovski as Max Witt
- David Bennent as Oja
- Franziska Singer as Frau Klein
- Juls Serger as Hermann Klein
- Jule Hermann as Nandl
