= Der Dicke =

German crime drama television series

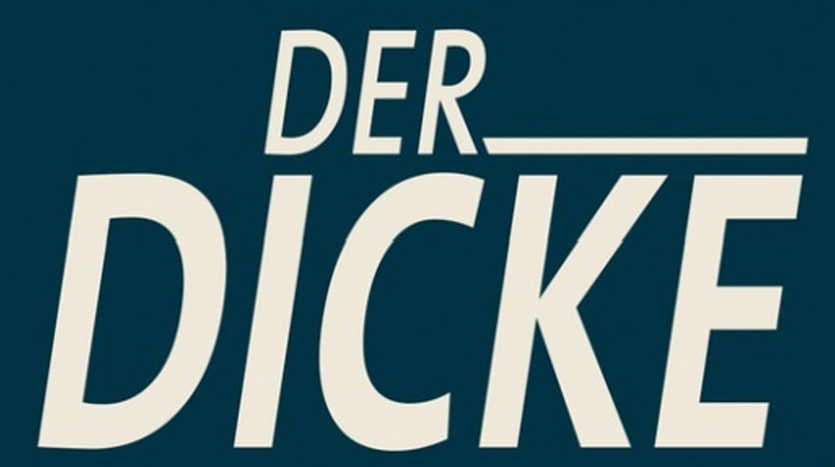
- Der Dicke logo
- Genre: Criminal drama
- Created by: Thorsten Näter
- Starring: Dieter Pfaff
- Country of origin: Germany
- Original language: German
- No. of seasons: 4
- No. of episodes: 52

Production
- Running time: 45 minutes

Original release
- Network: ARD
- Release: April 5, 2005 – August 21, 2012

Der Dicke (German: The Fat One) was a German criminal drama television series. After the death of actor Dieter Pfaff, who portrayed the protagonist, the series was renamed Die Kanzlei ("the law firm"), with Herbert Knaup as the new lead actor.

== See also ==
- List of German television series
