= Jakob Nüesch =

Swiss teacher and naturalist (1845–1915)

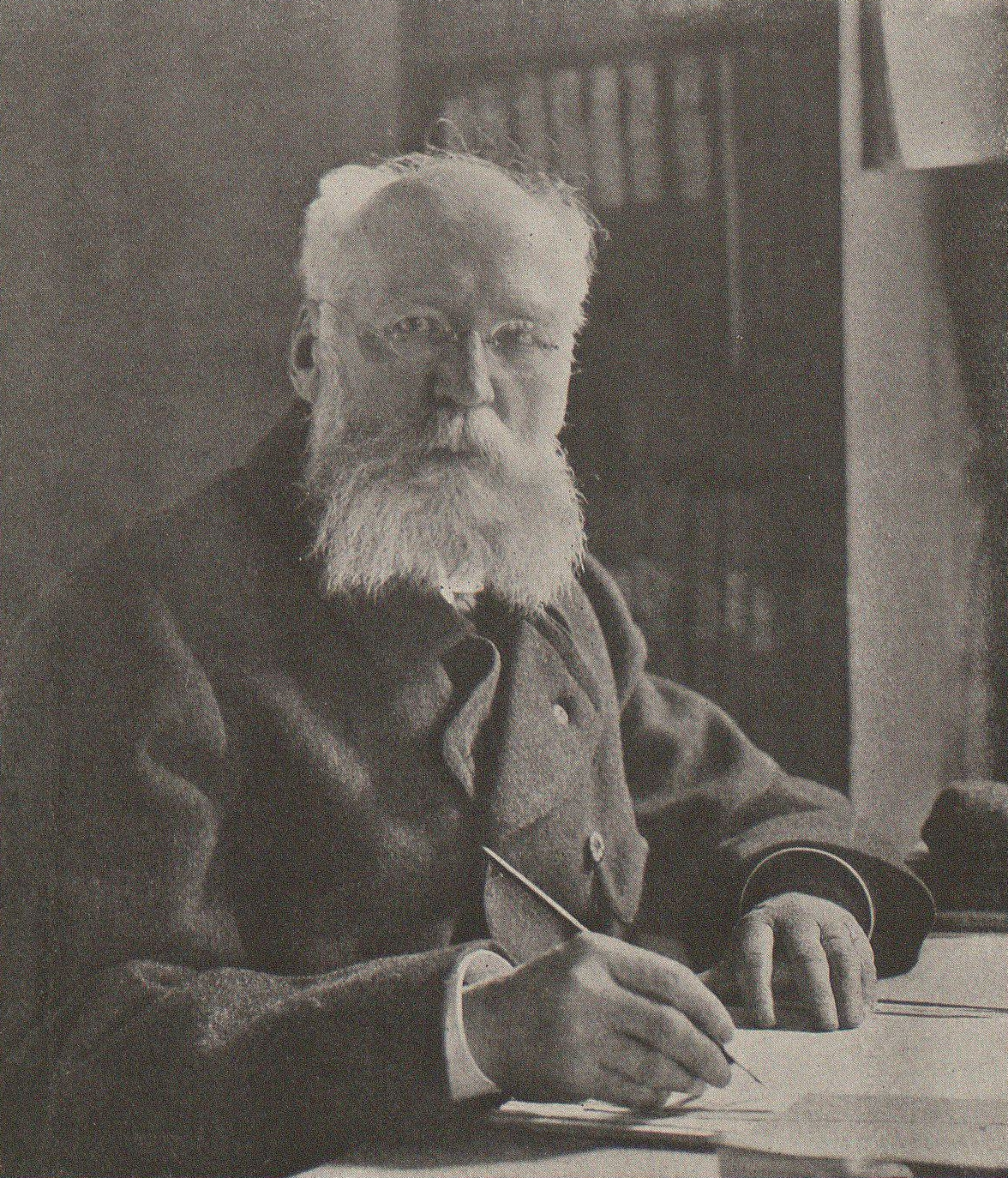
- Born: 11 August 1845; Hemmental, Schaffhausen, Switzerland
- Died: 8 October 1915 (aged 70); Schaffhausen, Switzerland
- Education: University of Zurich (doctorate, 1875)
- Occupations: Teacher; politician; naturalist
- Spouse: Pauline Graff (m. 1874)
- Parents: Johann Jakob Nüesch (father); Anna Hatt (mother)

Jakob Nüesch (11 August 1845 – 8 October 1915) was a Swiss teacher, politician and naturalist from Schaffhausen. He taught at the Realschule in Schaffhausen from 1869 to 1914 and was a member of the cantonal parliament from 1876 to 1915. As a natural scientist he discovered Bacterium lucens, and as a lay researcher he excavated the prehistoric sites in the Kesslerloch and above all at the Schweizersbild, together with Alfred Nehring and Albrecht Penck.

== Biography ==
Jakob Nüesch was born on 11 August 1845 in Hemmental, now part of Schaffhausen, the son of Johann Jakob Nüesch, a teacher, and Anna Hatt. In 1874 he married Pauline Graff, daughter of Peter Graff, a goldsmith.

Nüesch attended primary school in Hemmental and the Realschule and the Gymnasium in Schaffhausen. From 1864 to 1866 he studied natural sciences at the Polytechnikum in Stuttgart and at the University of Tübingen, where his teachers included the paleontologist and mineralogist Friedrich August Quenstedt. In 1875 he obtained his doctorate (Dr. phil. nat.) at the University of Zurich. From 1869 to 1914 he was a teacher at the Realschule in Schaffhausen.

From 1876 to 1915 Nüesch was a member of the cantonal parliament (Kantonsrat) of Schaffhausen, where he sat among others on the committee that discussed a new school law. From 1877 to 1884 he was a member of the education council (Erziehungsrat), and from 1889 to 1915 of the city parliament (Grosser Stadtrat) of Schaffhausen. From 1884 to 1915 he was a member of the church council (Kirchenrat) of the canton of Schaffhausen.

As a natural scientist, Nüesch discovered Bacterium lucens Nüesch. As a lay researcher, he excavated the prehistoric sites in the Kesslerloch and above all at the Schweizersbild, together with Alfred Nehring and Albrecht Penck. He published the results of the excavations in monographs. Nüesch died in Schaffhausen on 8 October 1915.

== Bibliography ==
- H. Stamm, Dr. Jakob Nüesch, 1915
- Verhandlungen der Schweizerischen Naturforschenden Gesellschaft 98, 1916, 39–47 (with a list of works)
- Schaffhauser Beiträge zur vaterländischen Geschichte 34, 1957, 217–220

=== Archives ===
- Stadtarchiv Schaffhausen: personal papers (Nachlass)
