= Hans Dorn =

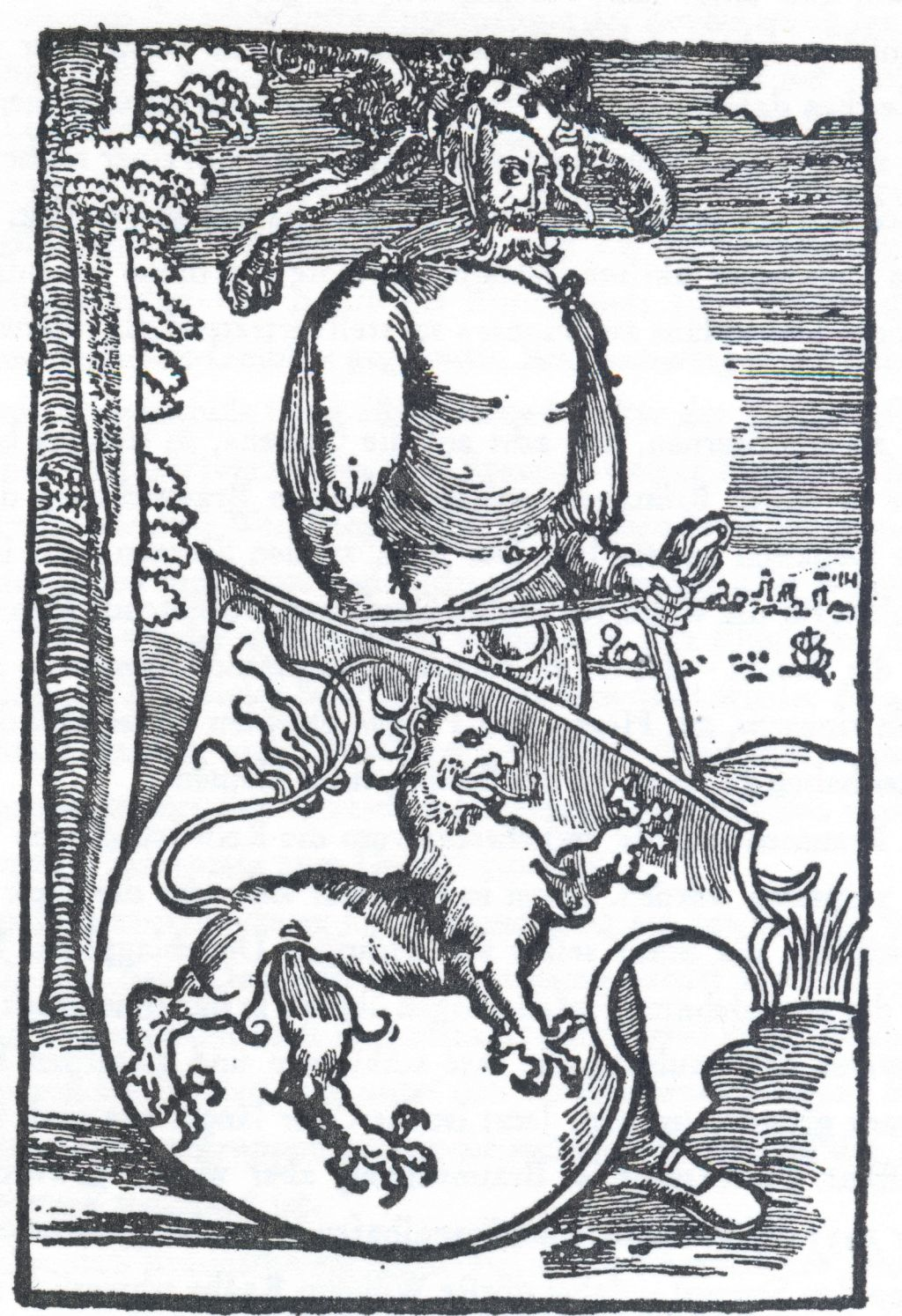
Dorn's printer's mark with the Brunswick coat of arms (1506)

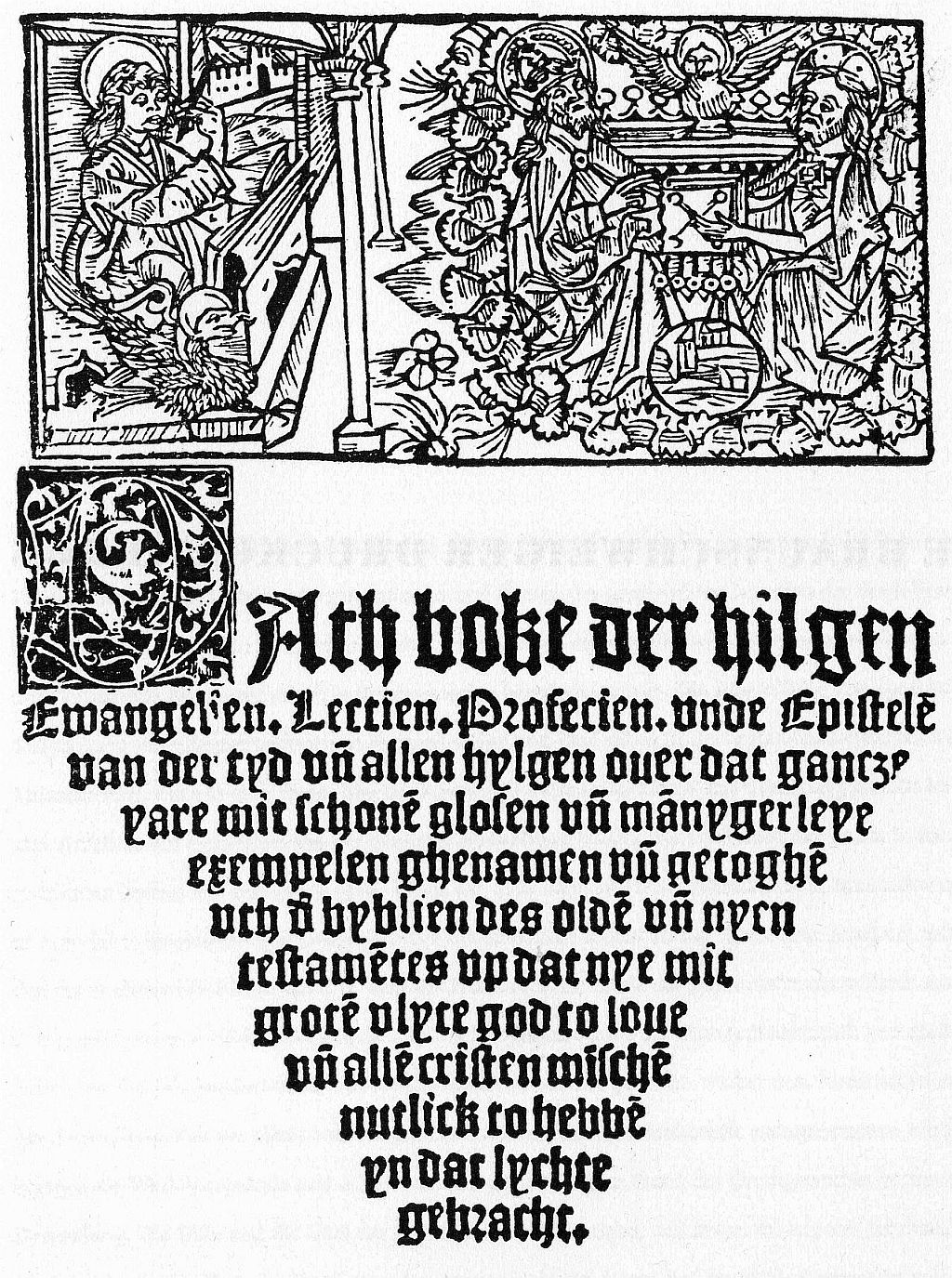
Title page of Dath boke der hilgen Ewangelien (1506)

Hans Dorn (or Johannes Dorn) was a German printer of the late 15th and early 16th centuries, active in Brunswick. He is known to have been in Brunswick during the period of 1493–1525.

He may have been active as a bookseller before becoming a printer. The first book known to have printed by him, and at the same time the oldest known book printed in Brunswick, is a Low German Plenarium with the title Dath boke der hilgen Ewangelien. Lectien. Profecien unde Epistelen, dated 15 July 1506. An earlier print by Dorn, dated 1502, is mentioned in an 18th-century source. Dorn primarily produced theological or liturgical works in Low German and Latin, such as Summula doctrinarum Jhesu Christi by Nikolaus Decius, St. Annen Büchlein. (1507), Judenspiegel. by Johannes Pfefferkorn (1507), Dialogus Contra impudicas foeminas by Henning Caldrusius (1511), Distichoneomenion Abaci: sive Computus ecclesiastici ... (1517), De guldene Lettanye: Dagelicke Anropynge unde Bede tho gode, Marien, und allem hemmelischen Hehre (1518).

From 1518, he also printed Protestant literature, such as Martin Luther's Sermon von Ablass und Gnade (1518) and Gottschalk Kruse's Von Adams und unsem Valle und Wedderuperstendinghe (1521). He also printed two medical works, and a travelogue of the pilgrimage from Hildesheim to Santiago de Compostela by Gerd Helmich. His last known print dates to 1525. The year of his death is unknown. He does not appear to have had a direct successor, the next known printer in Brunswik is Andreas Goldbeck, active from 1539.
