= Goebbels und Geduldig =

2001 film by Kai Wessel

- Written by: Peter F. Steinbach
- Directed by: Kai Wessel
- Country of origin: Germany
- Original language: German

Production
- Running time: 90 minutes

Original release
- Release: 2002

Goebbels und Geduldig is a 2002 German war comedy television film about Joseph Goebbels and Nazi Germany, directed by Kai Wessel, written by Peter F. Steinbach, and starring Ulrich Mühe in the two titular roles.

== Plot ==
Harry Geduldig is a Jewish lookalike of Goebbels, who has been held captive and a secret by Heinrich Himmler ever since the Nazis' rise to power in 1933. In 1944, Goebbels finds out about this and intends to liquidate his double. When the two men meet in person, Geduldig manages to escape and is from now on considered the real Goebbels by his entourage. Meanwhile the real Goebbels is held captive by Geduldig's prison wards and thought to be his own Jewish double.

== Cast ==
- Ulrich Mühe: Joseph Goebbels / Harry Geduldig
- Eva Mattes: Magda Goebbels
- Götz Otto: Brenneisen
- Dagmar Manzel: Grete Zipfel
- Dieter Pfaff: Eugen Haase
- Katharina Thalbach: Hertha Haase
- Katja Riemann: Eva Braun
- Jürgen Schornagel: Adolf Hitler
- Tilo Prückner: Heinrich Hoffmann
- Tobias Schenke: Prisoner in Concentration Camp

== Production ==
Due to its controversial nature as a Nazi satire, the film was in development for seven years, throughout which the script went through a number of substantial changes (18 different scripts were written). Even though the film was in fact finished in 2000, it was widely tested on international film festivals for two years to see how foreign and especially Jewish audiences would react to it, before it was eventually broadcast on ARD in 2002 after the broadcast had been announced and rescheduled several times.

== Reception ==
German reviewers praised especially the performance of Mühe in his double role. The German Lexikon des internationalen Films praised the cleverly written satire script and its "enlightening wit".
