= Dieter Pfaff =

German actor (1947–2013)

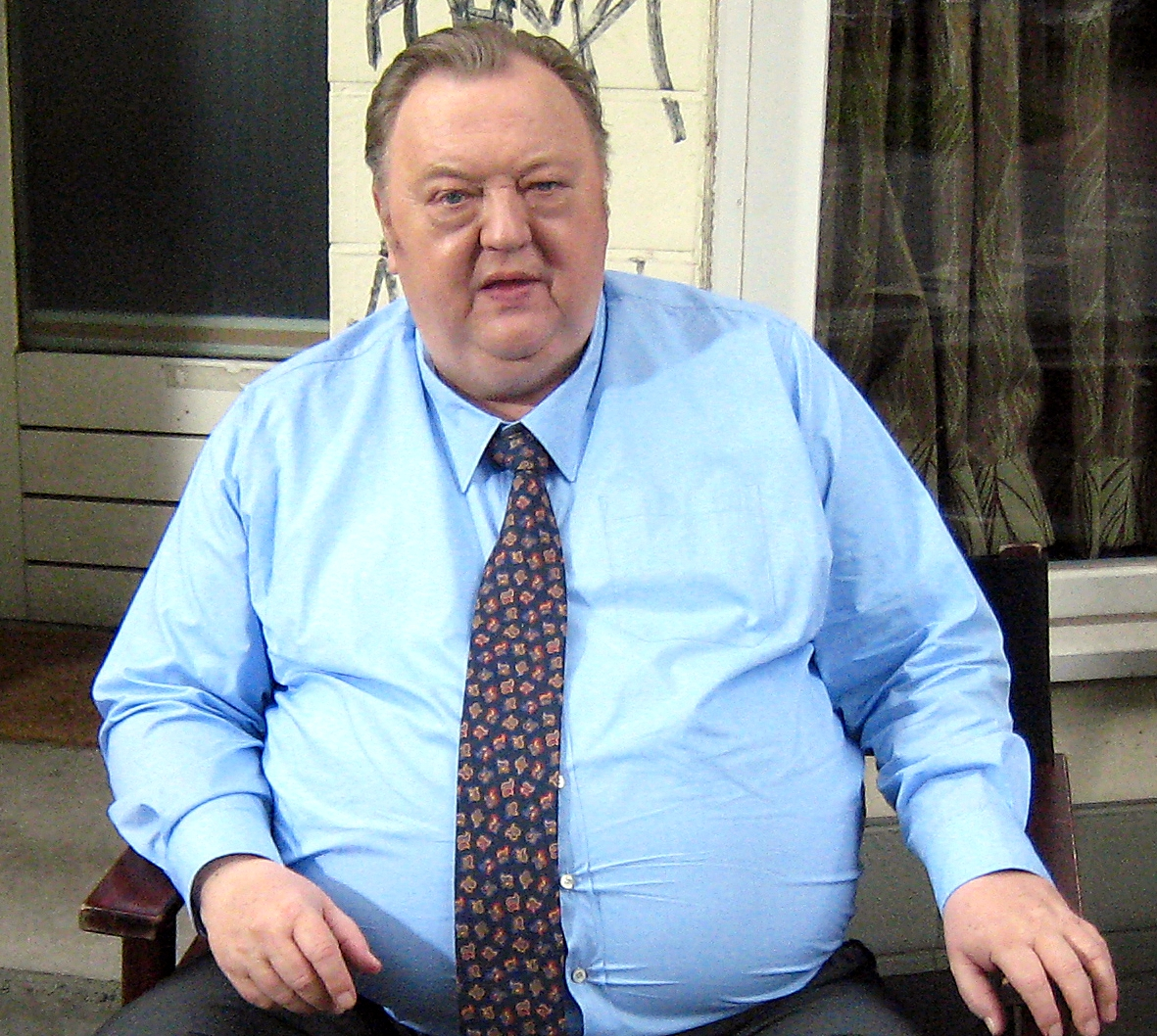
- Pfaff in 2010
- Born: 2 August 1947; Dortmund, Germany
- Died: 5 March 2013 (aged 65); Hamburg, Germany
- Occupations: Actor; director
- Years active: 1977—2012
- Known for: Sperling; Der Dicke

Dieter Pfaff (2 October 1947 – 5 March 2013) was a German actor and director.

The son of a police officer, Pfaff was best known as police officer Hans Sperling in the series Sperling. Sperling also appeared in two films about Swedish policeman Martin Beck, namely Flickan i jordkällaren and Den japanska shungamålningen. In 2002, he starred in Goebbels und Geduldig. Between 1984 and 1996, he played Otto Schatzschneider in the German krimi series Der Fahnder.

Pfaff and his wife Eva Maria Emminger had two children, twins Johanna and Maximilian. Pfaff was professor for acting at the Graz University of Music and Performing Arts from 1983 until 1990.

== Death ==
Pfaff was diagnosed with lung cancer in 2012, and died on 5 March 2013, aged 65.

== Selected filmography ==
- Der Fahnder (1984–1996, TV series, 109 episodes), as Otto Schatzschneider
- Das Phantom – Die Jagd nach Dagobert (1994, TV film), as Hauptkommissar Paule Pietsch
- Balko (1995–1997, TV series, 22 episodes), as Kriminaloberrat Vollmer
- Sperling (1996–2007, TV series, 18 episodes), as Kommissar Hans Sperling
- Bruder Esel (1996, TV series, 14 episodes), as Ludger Spengler
- Late Show (1999), as Mick Meyer
- Goebbels und Geduldig (2001), as Eugen Haase
- Die Affäre Semmeling (2002, TV miniseries), as Hermann Schomberg
- Bloch (2002–2013, TV series, 24 episodes), as Dr. Maximilian Bloch
- In the Shadow of Power (2003, TV film), as Hans-Dietrich Genscher
- Der Dicke (2005–2012, TV series, 52 episodes), as Gregor Ehrenberg
- Beck – Flickan i jordkällaren (2006, TV), as Kommissar Hans Sperling
- Beck – Den japanska shungamålningen (2007, TV), as Kommissar Hans Sperling
