= Schweizersbild =

Paleolithic rock shelter in Switzerland

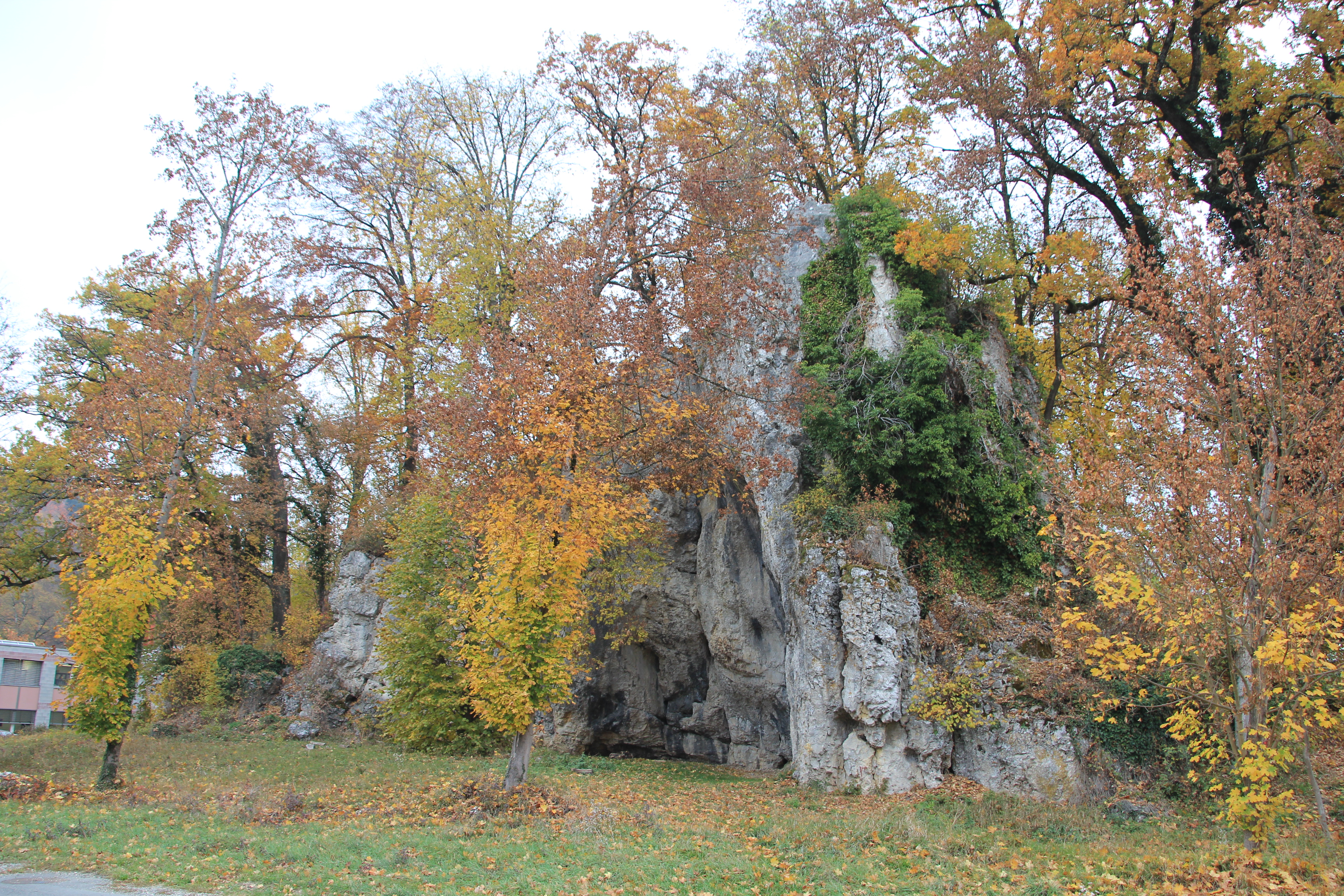

- Location in Switzerland Location in the canton of Schaffhausen
- 47°43′25.95″N 8°38′23.67″E
- Type: Rock shelter
- Periods: Upper Paleolithic (Magdalenian)
- Location: Schaffhausen, Switzerland

Site notes
- Excavation dates: 1891–1893
- Archaeologists: Jakob Nüesch

Schweizersbild is a rock shelter from the Paleolithic period, located in the municipality of Schaffhausen in Switzerland, at the foot of a southeast-facing cliff near a spring. Beneath the natural rock overhang, remains of a significant Upper Paleolithic (Magdalenian) habitation (camp) dating to approximately 15,000–12,700 BC were discovered.

== Discovery and excavations ==
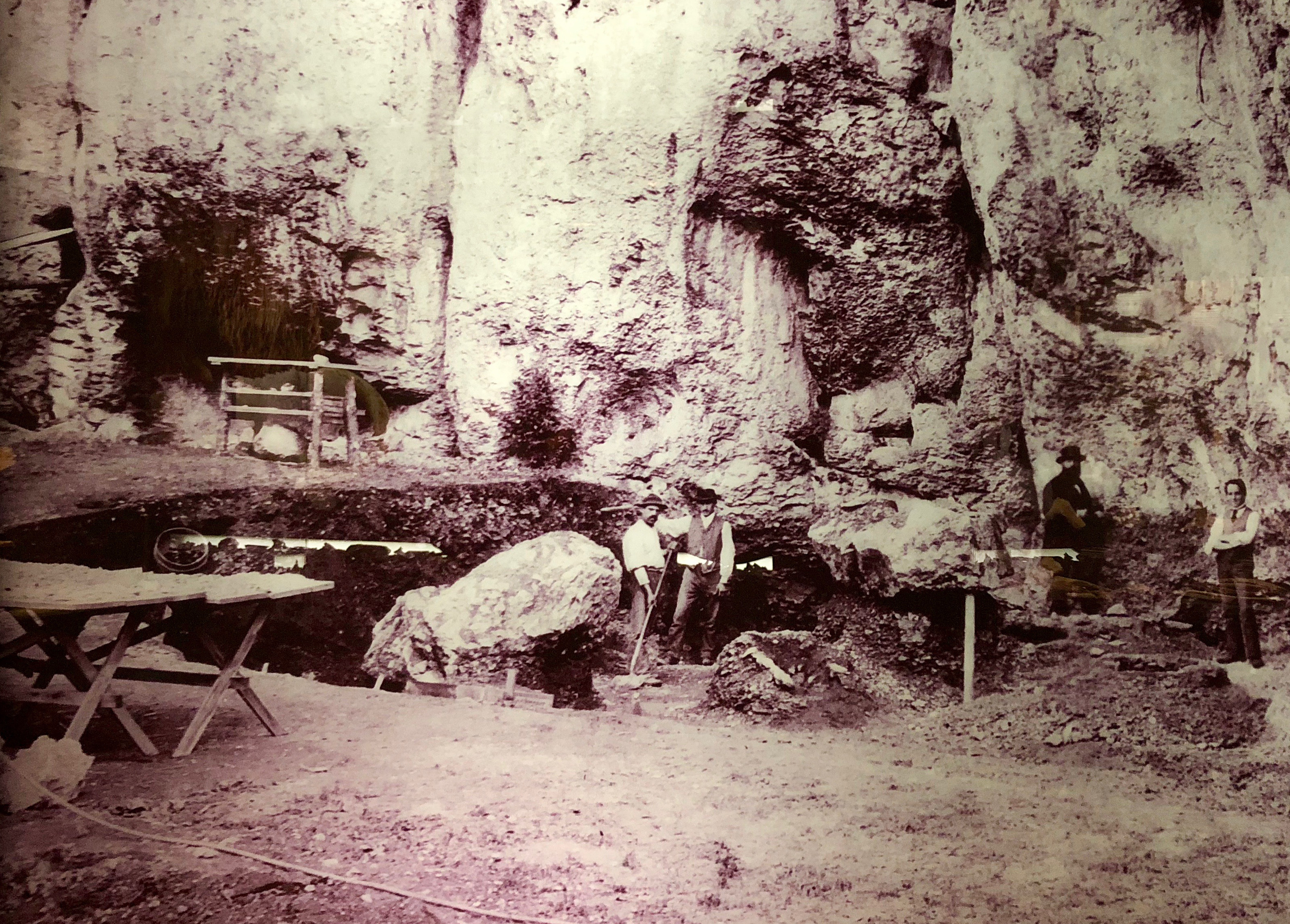
Excavations in 1892

The site was discovered in 1891 by Jakob Nüesch, who conducted archaeological excavations there from 1891 to 1893. Beneath a gray archaeological layer containing remains from post-Paleolithic periods (including Neolithic tombs) were the habitation levels from the Upper Paleolithic. Below this, a layer containing rodent remains but practically no artifacts covered a bed of Ice Age pebbles. Some of the smaller skeletons have initially been interpreted as the remains of pygmies, but they may rather represent shorter individuals.

== Stratigraphy ==
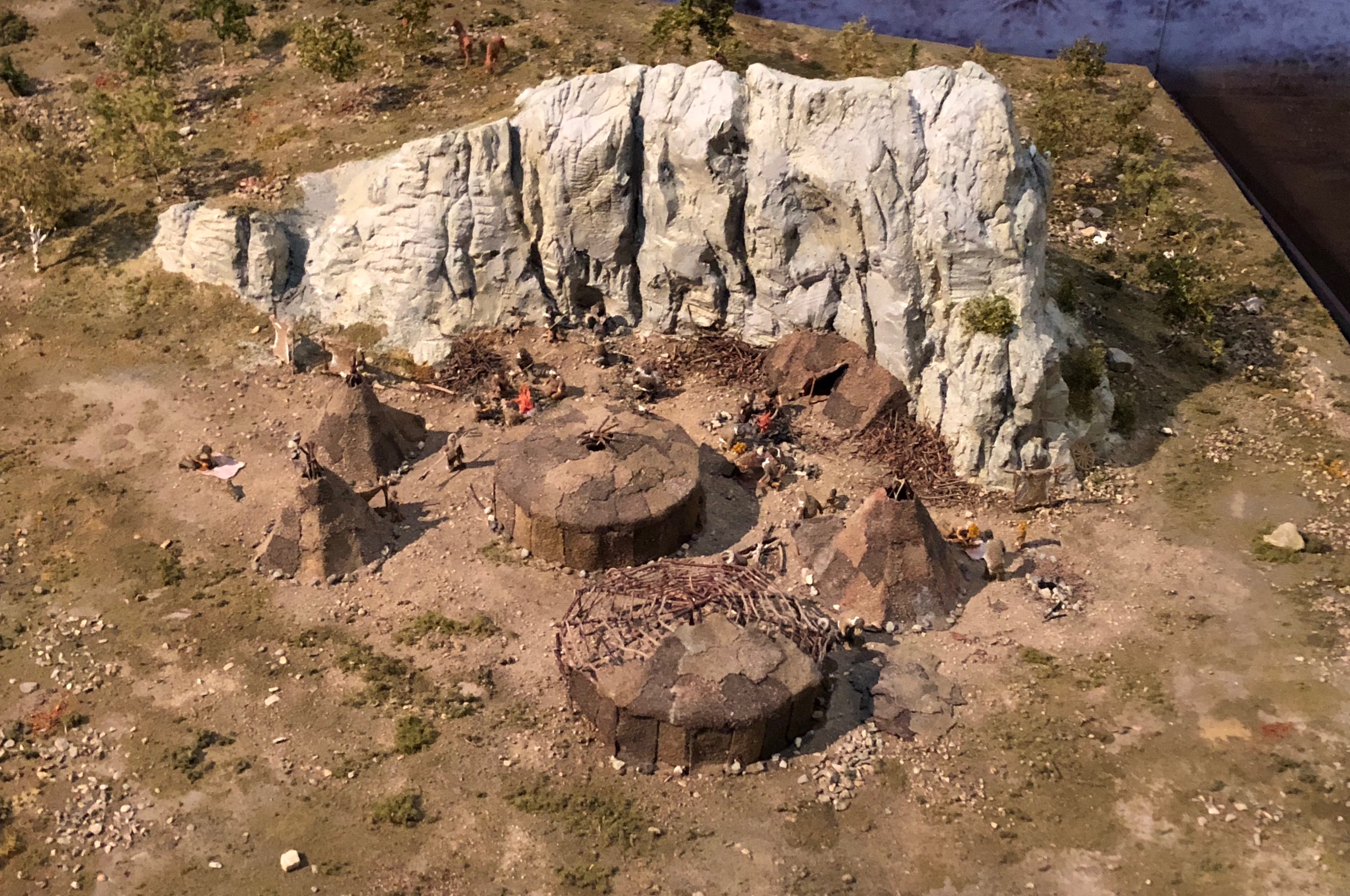
Model of the habitation at the Allerheiligen Museum

The stratigraphy cannot be reconstructed with certainty. Lower down, a second layer of rodent debris also contained remains of collared lemming, Arctic fox, reindeer, wild horse, mountain hare, as well as a rib fragment from a woolly rhinoceros. Above this, a yellow archaeological layer yielded primarily bones of reindeer, wild horse, mountain hare, and red deer. In this layer, a hearth and a flint knapping workshop were also observed.

== Artifacts ==
The artifacts uncovered by the excavators include several hundred tools made of flint (including shouldered points), bone, and antler (notably double-beveled spear points, harpoons, awls, perforated batons, needles, and ornaments).

== Paleolithic art ==
The Schweizersbild site is especially known for the pieces of Paleolithic mobiliary art discovered there, notably a slate plaquette engraved on both sides with animal figures and a perforated baton made of reindeer antler depicting two wild horses in a line. The engravings are more stylized than those from objects found at Kesslerloch, and executed with a more fluid line. A small jet statuette representing a woman, found in 1954 in the spoil from Nüesch's excavation, is less well known. The original is exhibited at the Museum of Cultures (Basel).

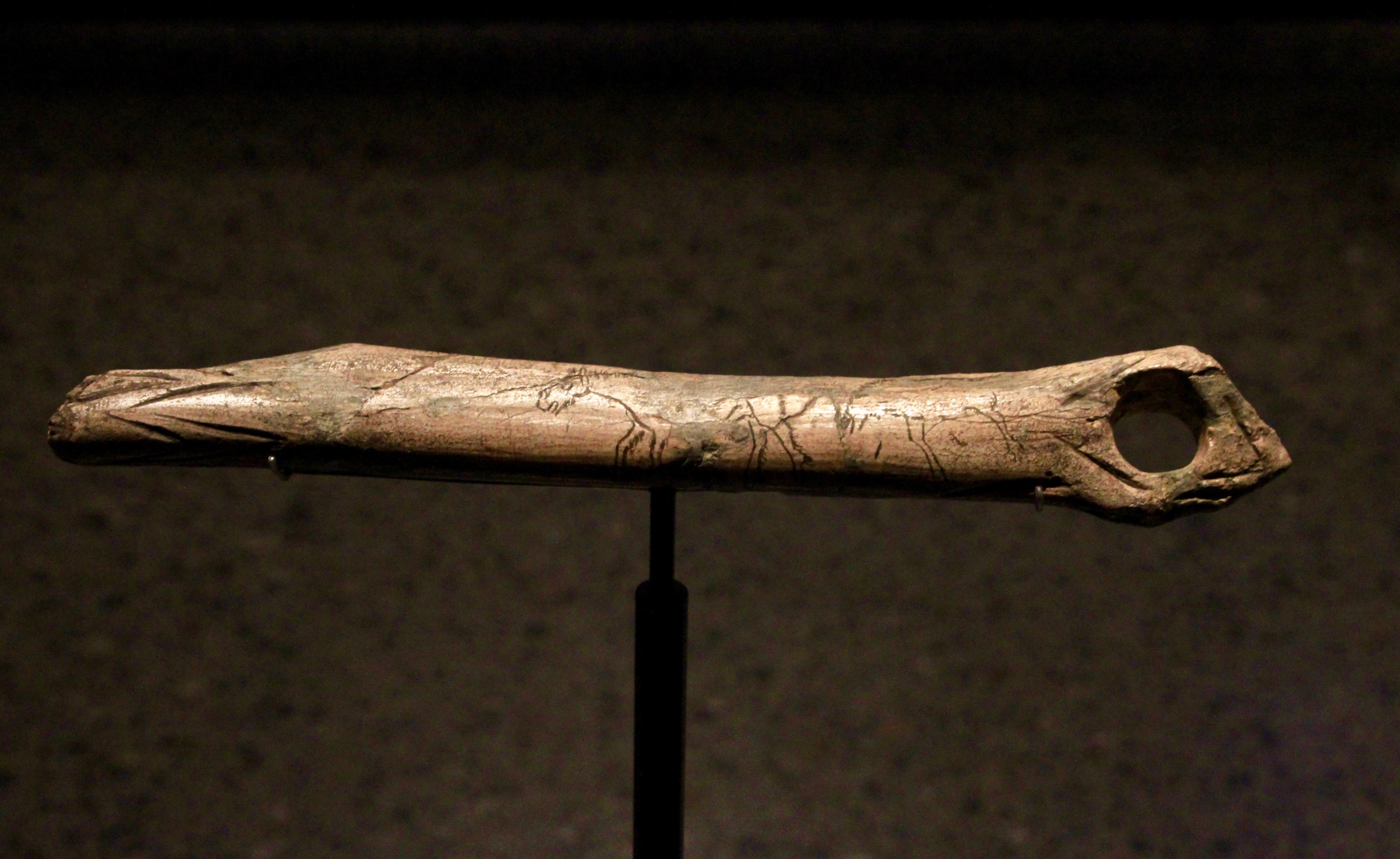
Perforated baton with two wild horses (Swiss National Museum)

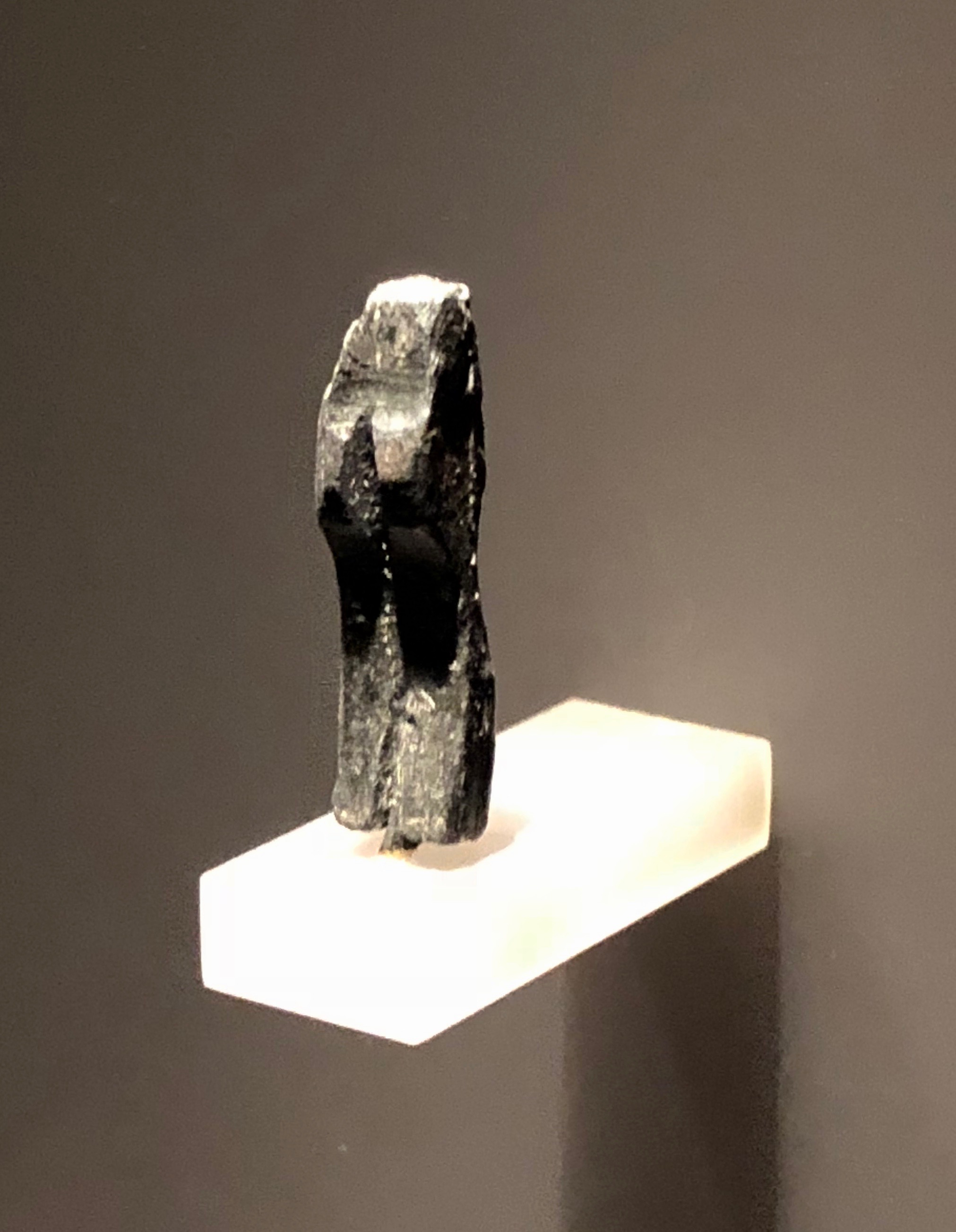
Copy of the woman statuette

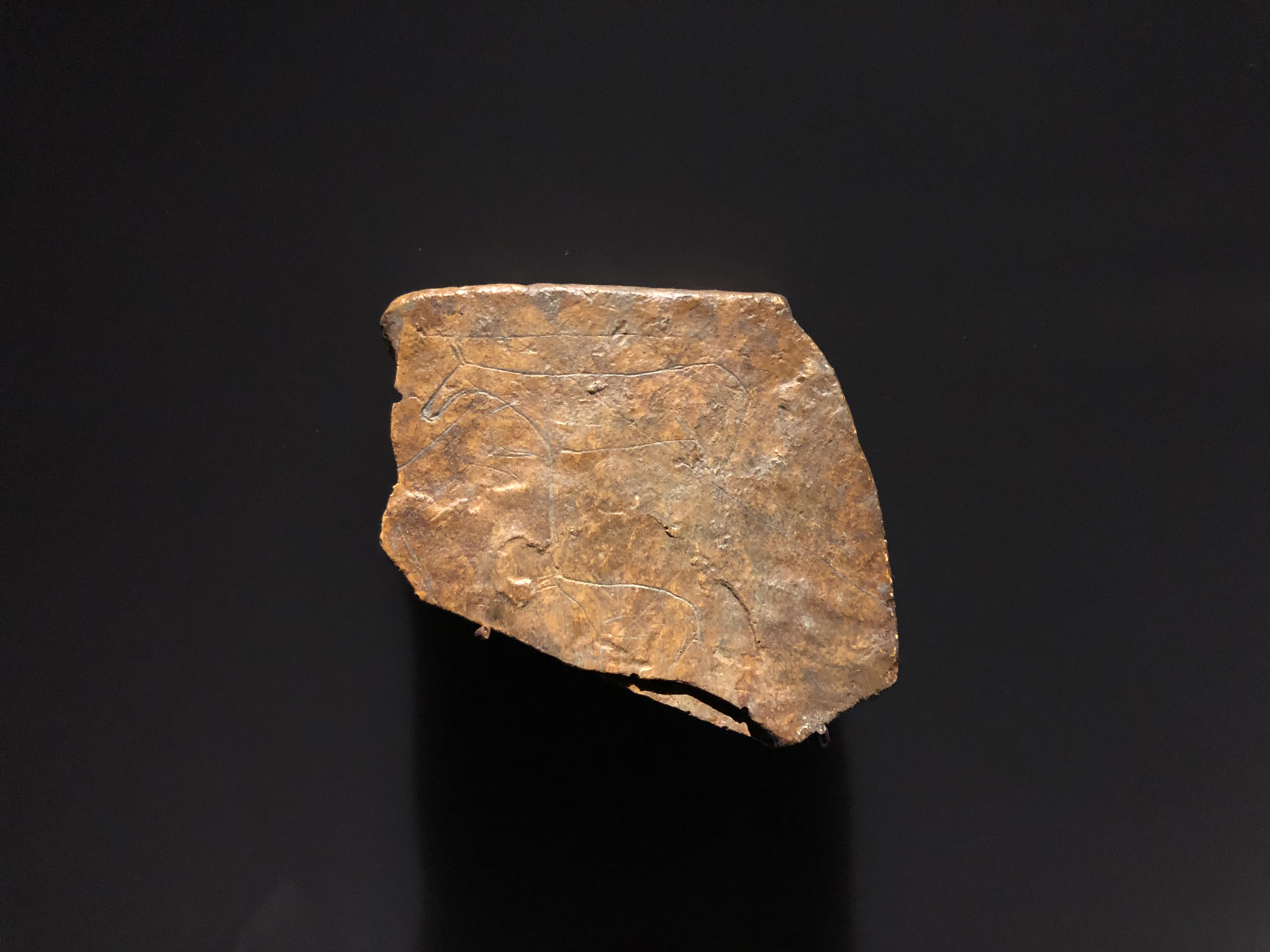
Engraved slate plaquette

== See also ==
- List of caves in Switzerland
- Paleolithic in Switzerland
