= Rosgartenmuseum =

Museum/arts centre in Konstanz, Germany

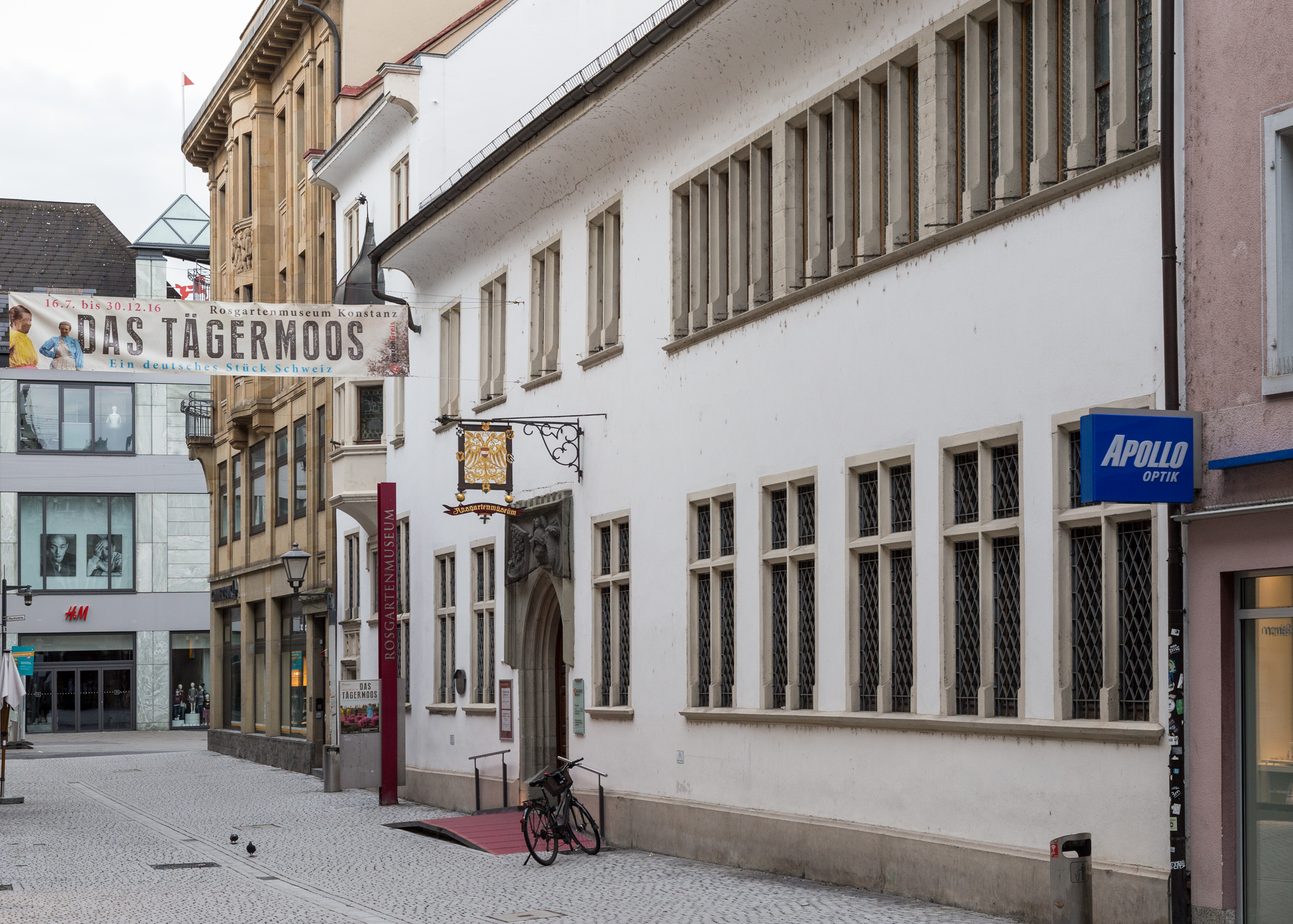
- The Rosgartenmuseum in Konstanz
- Established: 1870
- Location: Konstanz, Germany
- Coordinates: 47°39′35.6″N 9°10′29.3″E

The Rosgartenmuseum (lit. 'rose-garden museum') is an art gallery and cultural centre at 3–5 Rosgartenstraße in Konstanz, Germany. It is also a local history museum for the city and the surrounding Bodensee region. In 2014 had 100,028 visitors. It holds annual exhibitions on the region's art history and cultural history..

It is one of the oldest museums of its kind in the region. It was founded by the city councillor and pharmacist Ludwig Leiner in 1870. The museum was managed by Leiner and then by his sons Otto and Bruno.

It is housed in a house called "Zum Rosgarten" which was built in 1324 and served as the guildhall for butchers, grocers, pharmacists, potters and ropemakers in the medieval era. In 1454 one of its walls was knocked through to join that house to the next-door house called "Zum Schwarzen Widder" and the present guildhall room was created.

== Collections ==
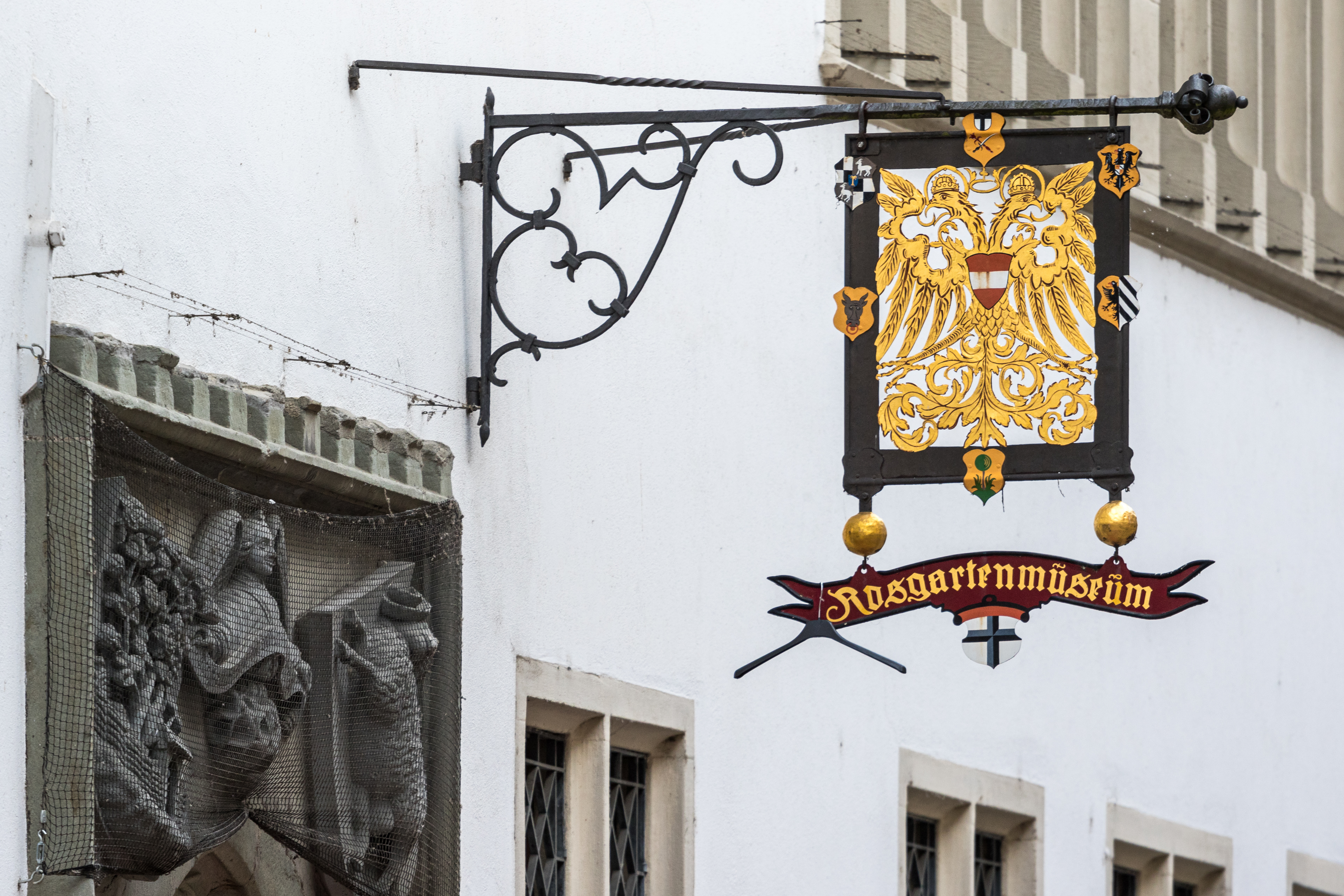
Coat of arms for the two medieval houses which now form the museum.

It houses documents, artworks and around 50,000 objects on the history of the city and region. The core of the collection was originally collected by Leiner and other private collectors. They range from Neolithic archaeological objects to medieval altarpieces, wood carvings from churches, paintings by artists born and active in Konstanz, 19th and 20th century everyday objects, and private letters and photographs by historical figures.

== Bibliography (in German) ==
- Verena Nübling: Die Pfahlbausammlung Ludwig Leiner im Rosgartenmuseum Konstanz – ein Kulturdenkmal von besonderer Bedeutung. In: Denkmalpflege in Baden-Württemberg. Band 29, 2000, S. 207–209.
- Tatiana Sfedu: Museumsgründung und bürgerliches Selbstverständnis. Die Familie Leiner und das Rosgartenmuseum in Konstanz. Dissertation, Universität Konstanz 2006 (Volltext).
- Tatiana Sfedu: Ein Konstanzer Bürgerwerk. Das Rosgartenmuseum seit Ludwig Leiner. Universitätsverlag Konstanz, Konstanz 2007, ISBN 978-3-89669-640-3.

== External links (in German) ==
- Official website
- Friends Association
