= Plenarium =

Compilation book in Catholicism

In the Roman Catholic Church, plenarium or plenarius (liber) (plural, plenaria) refers to any complete book of formulas and texts that contains all matters pertaining to one subject, which might otherwise be scattered in several books. The word is from the Latin, complete. Thus, the word appears in a work about the life of Robert Aldrich, Bishop of Carlisle, in reference to what seems to be a book of church rents.

== Examples ==
The entire office, or series of prayers and psalms said (or chanted) in the Roman Catholic Church — Vespers, Matins, Lauds and Mass — is called plenarium.

A complete copy of the four Gospel Books was called an evangeliarium plenarium (as distinct from an evangeliary or evangeliarium, a kind of Lectionary, which contains only pericopes or selections). Under this heading is classed the Book of Gospels at Lichfield Cathedral and the Book of Gospels given by Athelstan to Christ Church in Canterbury, now in the library of Lambeth Palace.

Some plenaria included all the writings of the New Testament, others those parts of the scriptures that were commonly read in the Mass and bore the name Lectionarium Plenarium.

In monasteries, the use of several books for each service created no great problem; but priests who did not make the Benedictine religious profession of "stability, conversion of manners and obedience" and who travelled from place to place on their missionary duties, found it best to carry a single book with them, and the complete missal or Missale Plenarium came into use among them, especially after the foundation of the mendicant orders. Early vestiges of that missal date to the ninth century, and by the eleventh or twelfth century the Missale Plenarium was widespread. It contained all necessary prayers for the celebration of the Mass, which until then had to be taken from different books — the Sacramentary, Lectionary, Evangelistary, Antiphonary, and Gradual.

In Germany, plenarium denoted a popular book that gave the German translation of the Epistles and Gospels for the Sundays and festivals of the entire liturgical year, together with a short exposition and instruction. Later editions added the Introit, Gradual, and other parts of the Mass.

The last book of the kind bearing the title plenarium was printed in 1522 at Basel.
