= Rotwelsch =

German-based thieves' argot

Rotwelsch (German: [ˈʁoːtvɛlʃ], "beggar's foreign (language)") or Gaunersprache (German: [ˈɡaʊnɐʃpʁaːxə] "crook's language") also Khokhmer Loshn (from Yiddish "חוכמער לשון", "tongue of the wise") is a secret language, a cant or thieves' argot, spoken by groups (primarily marginalized groups) in Germany, Switzerland, Austria, and Bohemia. The language is based on a mix including Low German, Yiddish, Hebrew, Romani, Latin, and Czech with a High German substrate.

== Name ==
Rotwelsch was first named by Martin Luther in the preface to his edition of Liber Vagatorum in the 16th century. Rot means "beggar" while welsch means "incomprehensible" (cf *Walhaz): thus, rotwelsch signifies the incomprehensible cant of beggars.

== History ==
Rotwelsch was formerly common among travelling craftspeople and vagrants. The language is built on a strong substratum of German, but contains numerous words from other languages, notably from various German dialects, and other Germanic languages like Yiddish, as well as from Romany languages. Rotwelsch has also played a great role in the development of the Yeniche language. In form and development it closely parallels the commercial speech ("shopkeeper language") of German-speaking regions.

During the 19th and 20th century, Rotwelsch was the object of linguistic repression, with systematic investigation by the German police.

== Examples ==
- Schokelmei = Kaffee (coffee)
- schenigeln = arbeiten (to work)
- Krauter = Chef eines Handwerkbetriebes (master artisan)
- Kreuzspanne = Weste (waistcoat)
- Wolkenschieber = Frisör, Barbier (barber)
- Stenz = Wanderstock des Handwerksburschen (walking stick)
- fechten = betteln (to beg)
- Platte machen = Unterkunft suchen (to seek lodging)
- Puhler = Polizist (policeman)

=== From Feraru's Muskel-Adolf & Co. ===
From:

Peter Feraru: Muskel-Adolf & Co.: Die ›Ringvereine‹ und das organisierte Verbrechen in Berlin [Muscle-Adolf & Co.: The ›Ring-Clubs‹ and Organised Crime in Berlin]. Argon, Berlin 1995.

- abfaßen = to arrest (literally 'touch off', secondary: 'to write out')
- acheln = to eat (from Hebrew)
- ackern = to go acquire; to go off the line (literally 'to till or cultivate')
- den Affen kaufen = to get drunk (literally 'to buy the ape')
- alle gehn = to be arrested; to vanish into thin air
- assern = to testify against someone, to 'betray' them
- aufmucken = to revolt against orders
- auftalgen = to hang (literally 'to grease up')
- der Getalgente = the hanged man
- balldowern = to spy out; to make inquiries about (perhaps from Hebrew Ba'al Davar = one who brings an accusation)
- ballmischpet = examining magistrate (from Hebrew Ba'al Mishpat = Master of Law)
- der Bau = the prison or penitentiary (literally 'the lodge')
- Bauer = a stupid simple-minded person (literally 'peasant' or 'farmer')
- begraben sein = to be hunted for a long time (literally 'to be buried')
- bei jom = by day (Hebrew yom = day)
- bei leile = by night (Hebrew laila = night)
- der Bello = the prison toilet
- beramschen = to swindle
- berappen = to pay up or fork over money (literally 'to plaster a wall'); also possibly from Malayan through Dutch: berapa means 'how much?' (what does it cost), now integrated in Dutch as berappen: to pay.
- betuke = discreet or imperceptible (perhaps from Hebrew betokh = within)
- die Bim = the tramway
- bleffen (or anbleffen) = to threaten. Possibly from Dutch: blaffen: to bark (like a dog).
- der Bock, from Romani bokh = hunger, coll. Bock haben = to be up for something.
- Bombe = coffee glass (literally 'bombshell')
- brennen (literally 'to burn') = Extortion, but also to collect the "thieves' portion" with companions. The analogy between distilling spirits (Branntweinbrennen) and taking a good gulp of the portion (Anteil) is obvious.

== Current status ==
Variants of Rotwelsch, sometimes toned down, can still be heard among travelling craftspeople and funfair showpeople as well as among vagrants and beggars. Also, in some southwestern and western locales in Germany, where travelling peoples were settled, many Rotwelsch terms have entered the vocabulary of the vernacular, for instance in the municipalities of Schillingsfürst and Schopfloch. Some Rotwelsch- and Yenish-speaking vagrant communities also exist in Switzerland due the country's neutral status during World War Two.

A few Rotwelsch words have entered the colloquial language, for example, aufmucken, Bau, and berappen. Baldowern or ausbaldowern is very common in the Berlin dialect; Bombe is still used in German prison jargon. Bock haben is also still used all around Germany. The Manisch dialect of the German city of Gießen is still used, although it was only spoken fluently by approximately 700-750 people in 1976.

== Code ==
Josef Ludwig Blum from Lützenhardt (Black Forest) wrote from war prison:

"[E]s grüßt Dich nun recht herzlich Dein Mann, viele Grüße an Schofel und Bock. Also nochmals viel Glück auf ein baldiges Wiedersehen in der schönen Heimat. Viele Grüße an Mutter u. Geschwister sowie an die Deinen.", which roughly translates to - "Your husband sends you his warmest regards. Greetings to Schofel and Bock. Wishing you every happiness and hoping to see you again in our beautiful homeland. Many greetings to your family."

The censors allowed the passage to remain, apparently believing that Bock and Schofel were people. They were instead code words, Schofel ("bad") and Bock ("hunger"), which hid the message that the prisoners weren't doing well, and that they were starving.

== In arts ==
A variant of Rotwelsch was spoken by some American criminal groups in the 1930s and the 1940s, and harpist Zeena Parkins' 1996 album Mouth=Maul=Betrayer made use of spoken Rotwelsch texts.

An example of Rotwelsch is found in Gustav Meyrink's Der Golem and reads as follows:

An Beindel von Eisen recht alt.
An Stranzen net gar a so kalt.
Messinung, a' Räucherl und Rohn,
und immerrr nurr putzen.
Und stoken sich Aufzug und Pfiff,
und schmallern an eisernes G'süff.
Juch,
Und Handschuhkren, Harom net san.

— Gustav Meyrink

== See also ==
- Germanía
- Grypsera
- Lotegorisch
- Polari
- Yenish

== Notes and references ==
=== Further reading ===
- Puchner, Martin (13 October 2020). The Language of Thieves: My Family's Obsession with a Secret Code the Nazis Tried to Eliminate (First ed.). New York. ISBN 978-1-324-00591-9. OCLC 1137818284.
- Sobota, Heinz. 1978. Der Minus-Mann, Verlag Kiepenheuer und Witsch.
- Wolf, S.A.: Wörterbuch des Rotwelschen. Deutsche Gaunersprache, 1985/1993, 431 pp., ISBN 3-87118-736-4
