= Kai Wessel (director) =

German film director (born 1961)

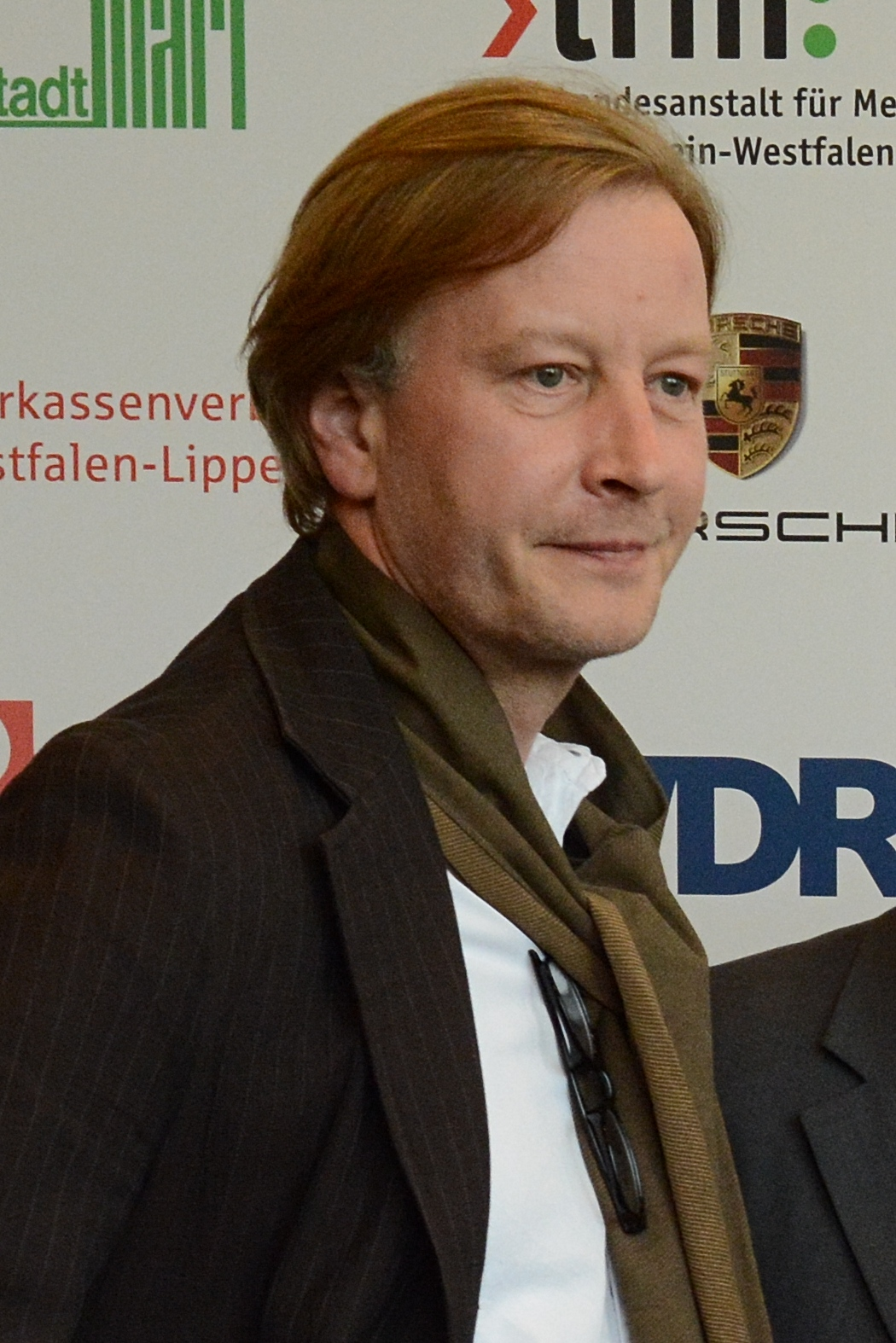
- Kai Wessel in 2014
- Born: 19 September 1961 (age 64); Hamburg, West Germany
- Occupation: Film director
- Years active: 1988–present

Kai Wessel (born 19 September 1961) is a German film director. He has directed more than thirty films since 1988.

== Selected filmography ==
- Martha Jellneck (1988)
- Klemperer – Ein Leben in Deutschland (1999, TV series)
- Goebbels und Geduldig (2001)
- The Year of the First Kiss (2002)
- March of Millions (2007, TV film)
- Hilde (2009)
- Zeit der Helden (2013, TV miniseries)
- Fog in August (2016)
