= Yenish language =

German variety spoken by Yenish people

Yenish
- Native to: Germany, Switzerland, Austria, France, Netherlands, and elsewhere
- Ethnicity: Yenish
- Native speakers: 16,000 (2006)
- Language family: Indo-European: Germanic; West Germanic; High German; Yenish
- Writing system: Latin (German alphabet)

Official status
- Recognised minority language in: Switzerland

Language codes
- ISO 639-3: yec
- Glottolog: yeni1236

Yenish (French: Yeniche, German: Jenisch, Luxembourgish: Jéinesch) is a variety of German spoken by the Yenish people, former nomads living mostly in Germany, Austria, Switzerland, Alsace, Luxembourg, and other parts of France.

== Components ==
Yenish has been documented since the 18th century. Yenish speakers generally speak their local German dialect, enriched by the Yenish vocabulary, which is derived in part from Rotwelsch, with influences from Yiddish, Romani, and other minority languages of their region.

The Yenish vocabulary contains many words of Romani and Yiddish (and through the latter route, Hebrew) origin; it also has many unusual metaphors and metonyms that replace the standard German words. Some original Yenish words have become parts of standard German.

The Yenish were originally travelers, they were people with professions outside of mainstream society that required them to move from town to town, such as showpeople, tinkers, and door-to-door salesmen. Today, the Yenish jargon is only used in certain isolated locations, such as certain poor districts of Berlin, Münster, some Eifel villages, and Luxembourg.

Individual variants of the Yenish language can be quite distinct, and have names of their own, such as Masematte, Lepper Talp, Heenese Vlek, and others.

Yenish has a grammatical syntax borrowed from the German language and its vocabulary is a mixture of Yiddish, Hebrew and German with some French and Romani terms.

The origin of Yenish peoples is unclear but it would be linked to a gradual interbreeding over the centuries between itinerant German and Ashkenazi Jewish populations, then the integration of certain members of the Roma communities: according to Yaron Matras of the University of Manchester, the Yenish community has, over the centuries, integrated members of minority communities such as Roma and Jews who, for one reason or another, left their own communities. This hypothesis is shared by Rémy Welschinger, who specifies that, due to the various wars and numerous food shortages, Jews and Yenish were forced to live marginally by exercising professions which required great mobility and that the two peoples were able to settle and their languages to mix. In this hypothesis, the Yenish language would mainly come from the mixture of Rotwelsch, the language of the marginalized of Germanic origin, and Yiddish and Hebrew, the languages of the Ashkenazi Jews, when the poor and marginalized itinerant German populations absorbed, notably via mixed unions, the Jews rejected on the road, following the persecutions carried out against them at the time. According to Sandrine Szwarc also raises the hypothesis that the Yenishes are, at least for certain families, descendants of Ashkenazi crypto-Jews.

According to the Encyclopedia of Hebrew Language and Linguistics, Yenish "words of Hebrew origin, such as laf 'no' (= לאו lav) and Schuck 'market' (= שוק šuq), entered Yenish with the Ashkenazi pronunciation employed when Hebrew words were integrated in the Judeo-German speech of German Jews", that is to say before its modification in contact with Slavic languages.

== See also ==
- Lotegorisch
