= Yenish people =

Semi-nomadic people in Western Europe

Yenish

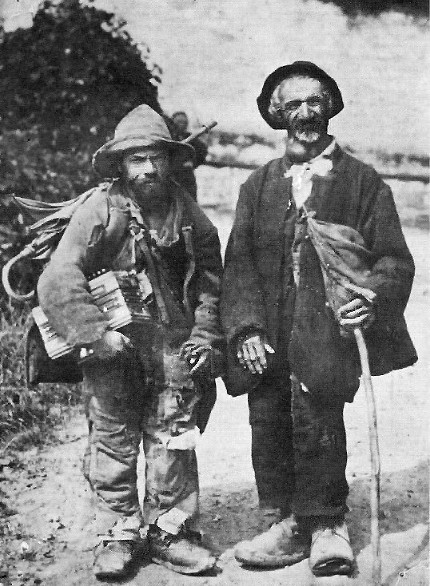
- Two Yenish in Muotathal, Switzerland, c. 1890

Total population
- c. 700,000

Regions with significant populations
- Germany, Switzerland, Austria, France, Netherlands
- Germany: 200,000
- Switzerland: 30,000

Languages
- Yenish, German (Swiss German, Bavarian), French, DGS, DSGS, ÖGS, LSF

Religion
- Christianity, Judaism, Islam

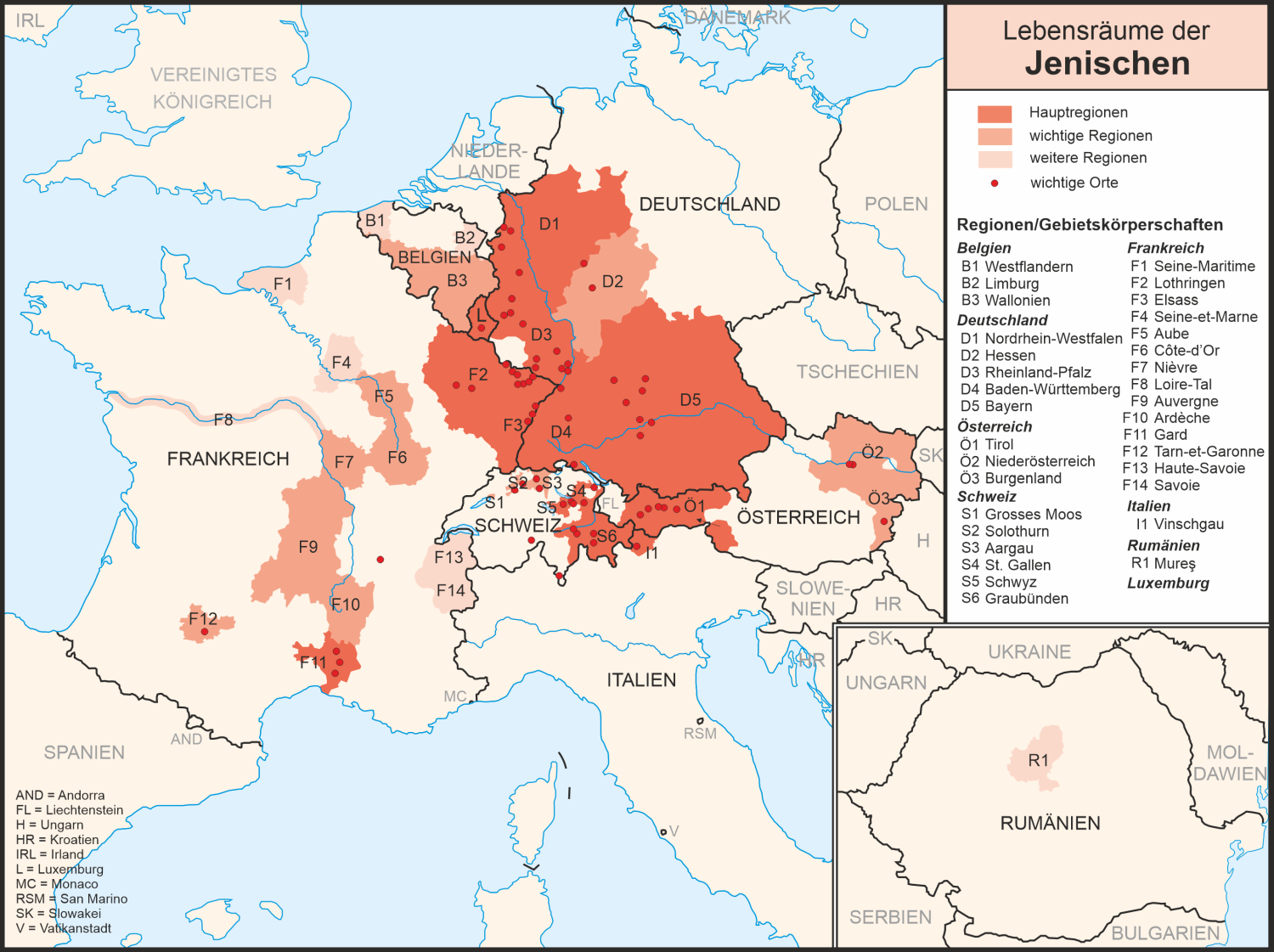
Geographic distribution of the Yenish (2007 upload, unreferenced)

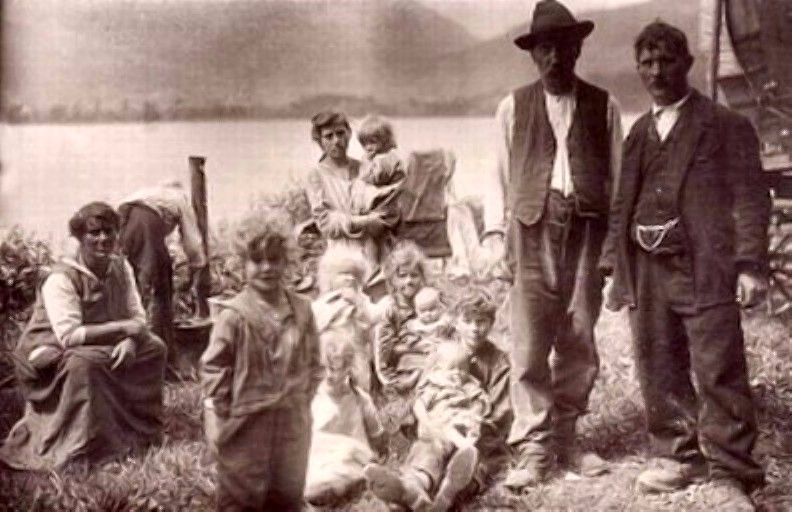
Yenish at Lake Lauerz, Schwyz, Switzerland, 1928

The Yenish (German: Jenische; French: Yéniche, Taïtch, Luxembourgish: Jënesch) are an itinerant group in Western and Central Europe who live mostly in Germany, Austria, Switzerland, Luxembourg, Belgium, and parts of France, roughly centered on the Rhineland. The origins of the Yenish are unknown, though a number of theories for the group's origins have been proposed, including that the Yenish descended from members of the marginalised and vagrant poor classes of society of the early modern period, before emerging as a distinct group by the early 19th century. Most of the Yenish became sedentary in the course of the mid-19th to 20th centuries.

== Name ==
The Yenish people as a distinct group, as opposed to the generic class of vagrants of the early modern period, emerged towards the end of the 18th century. The adjective jenisch is first recorded in the early 18th century in the sense of "cant, argot". (Note: The 1714 reference refers to the Rotwelsch cant, not its speakers, with no implication of an itinerant lifestyle.) A self-designation Jauner is recorded in 1793. (Note: Jauner is reported as a Rotwelsch term for vagrants in Swabia. Johann Ulrich Schöll, Abriß des Jauner- und Bettelwesens in Schwaben nach Akten und andern sichern Quellen von dem Verfasser des Konstanzer Hans. Stuttgart 1793. The author of the 1793 work identifies the vagrant populations of criminals as a recent phenomenon, originally due to vagrant soldiers in the Thirty Years' War and reinforced by later wars.) Jenisch remained strictly an adjective that refers to the language, not the people, until the first half of the 19th century. Jean Paul (1801) glosses jänische Sprache ("Yenish language") with "so nennt man in Schwaben die aus fast allen Sprachen zusammengeschleppte Spitzbubensprache" ("this is the term used in Swabia for an argot used by rogues which has been cobbled together from all sorts of languages"). An anonymous author in 1810 argues that Jauner is a deprecating term, equivalent to card sharp, and that the proper designation for the people should be "jenische Gasche", "Gasche" being a slang word derived from the Romani term for "non-Romani".

== History ==
The origins of the Yenish are unknown, though a number of theories for the group's origins have been proposed, including that the Yenish descended from members of the marginalised and vagrant poor classes of society of the early modern period, before emerging as a distinct group by the early 19th century.

Linguist Yaron Matras and anthropologist Rémy Welschinger have identified a history where Yenish communities absorbed members of other itinerant and marginalised communities who left those communities for various reasons over the centuries, including Romani and Jewish individuals.

=== Germany ===
Many Yenish people in Germany became sedentary in the second half of the 19th century. The Kingdom of Prussia in 1842 introduced a law forcing municipalities to provide social welfare to permanent residents without citizenship. As a consequence, there were attempts to prevent Yenish people from taking permanent residence. Recently established settlements of Yenish, Sinti, and Roma, dubbed "gypsy colonies" (Zigeunerkolonien), were discouraged and attempts were made to incite the settlers to move away, in the form of various forms of harassment, and in some cases physical attacks. By the late 19th century, many recently sedentary Yenish were nevertheless integrated into local populations, gradually moving away from their tradition of endogamy thus being absorbed into the general German population. Those Yenish who did not become sedentary by the late 19th century took to living in trailers.

The persecution of Romani people under Nazi Germany beginning in 1933 was directed not exclusively against the Romani people but also targeted "vagrants who travel around after the manner of the gypsies" ("nach Zigeunerart umherziehende Landfahrer"), which included the Yenish and people without permanent residence in general. Travellers were scheduled for internment in Buchenwald, Dachau, Sachsenhausen and Neuengamme. Yenish families began to be registered in a Landfahrersippenarchiv ('archive of travelling families'), but this effort was incomplete by the end of World War II. It appears that only very limited numbers of Yenish (compared with the number of Romani victims) were actually deported: five Yenish individuals are on record as having been deported from Cologne, and a total of 279 woonwagenbewoners ('caravan dwellers') are known to have been deported from the Netherlands in 1944. Lewy (2001) has discovered one case of the deportation of a Yenish woman in 1939. The Yenish people are mentioned as a persecuted group in the text of the 2012 Memorial to the Sinti and Roma Victims of National Socialism in Berlin.

=== Switzerland ===
In 2001, Swiss National Councillor Remo Galli, as speaker of the foundation Zukunft für Schweizer Fahrende, reported an estimate of 35,000 "travellers" (Fahrende, a term combining Sinti, Roma and Yenish), both sedentary and non-sedentary, in Switzerland, among them an estimated 20,000 Yenish people. Mariella Mehr had already claimed in 1979 that there were "about 20,000 Yenish", among whom only "a handful of families who are still travelling".

From the 1920s until the 1970s, the Swiss government had a semi-official policy of institutionalizing Yenish parents as mentally ill and having their children adopted by members of the sedentary Swiss population. The name of this program was Kinder der Landstrasse ('Children of the Road'). The separation of children was justified as the Yenish being a 'criminal milieu' of 'homelessness and vagrancy' was later criticized as a violation of the fundamental rights of the Yenishe to family life, with children separated from parents by force without due criminal procedure, and resulting in many of the children suffering an ordeal of successive foster homes and orphanages. In all, 590 children were taken from their parents and institutionalized in orphanages, mental institutions, and even prisons. Child removals peaked in the 1930s to 1940s, in the years leading up to and during World War II. After public criticism in 1972, the program was discontinued in 1973. In February 2025, the Swiss government formally acknowledged that the forced removals and assimilation efforts targeting the Yenish, Manouche, and Sinti people under the Kinder der Landstrasse program constitute a crime against humanity under international law.

An organisation for the political representation of travellers (Yenish as well as Sinti and Roma) was founded in 1975, named Wheel Cooperative of the Road (Radgenossenschaft der Landstrasse). The Swiss federal authorities have officially recognized the "Swiss Yenish and Sinti" as a "national minority". (Note: Since autumn 2016, the Swiss federal authorities officially declare: "With the ratification of the Framework Convention of the Council of Europe of 1 February 1995 on the Protection of National Minorities, Switzerland has recognized the Swiss Yenish and Sinti as a national minority—regardless of whether they live travelling or sedentary.") With the ratification of the European language charter in 1997, Switzerland has given the status of a "territorial non-tied language" to the Yenish language.

=== Austria ===
Around 1800, a group of Yenish settled in Loosdorf near Melk, and since then a language island of Yenish has existed there. In November 2021, on the initiative of linguist Heidi Schleich and now chairman Marco Buckovez, the association Jenische in Österreich (Yenish in Austria) was founded with headquarters in Innsbruck. As part of a meeting with the ethnic group spokespersons of the parliamentary parties, the association submitted a request for recognition in accordance with the Ethnic Groups Act on 23 March 2022.

=== France ===
While there are references to Yenish people in France, there are no reported figures. Alain Reyniers wrote in a 1991 article in the journal Études Tsiganes that the Yenish "probably form the largest group of travellers in France today".

== Yenish organisations ==
- Radgenossenschaft der Landstrasse (Switzerland)
- Jenischer Kulturverband (Austria)
- Jenischer Bund in Deutschland und Europa (Germany)
- Woonwagenbelangen Nederland (Netherlands)
- FC Grünweiss Ichenhausen, based in Ichenhausen, Germany, formed in 1980 as a Yenish football club

== Film and television ==
- 1957: Es geschah am hellichten Tag
- 1979: Das gefrorene Herz
- 1992: Kinder der Landstrasse
- 2008: Hunkeler macht Sachen
- 2016: Fog in August based on the 2008 book of the same name
- 2017: Dove cadono le ombre
- 2023: Ruäch — eine Reise ins jenische Europa
- 2023: Lubo

== Notable people ==
- Mariella Mehr (1947–2022), notable for documenting the plight she suffered under the Kinder der Landstrasse project in the 1970s, contributing to its discontinuation
- François Remetter (1928–2022), French footballer
- Stephan Eicher (b. 1960), Swiss musician, Yenish on his father's side
- Oliver Kayser, Luxembourgish musician and variété performer
- Rafael van der Vaart (b. 1983), Dutch footballer
- Pierre Bodein (b. 1947), French spree killer

== See also ==
- Gens du voyage (France)
