= Lotegorisch =

Variant of the secret language Rotwelsch

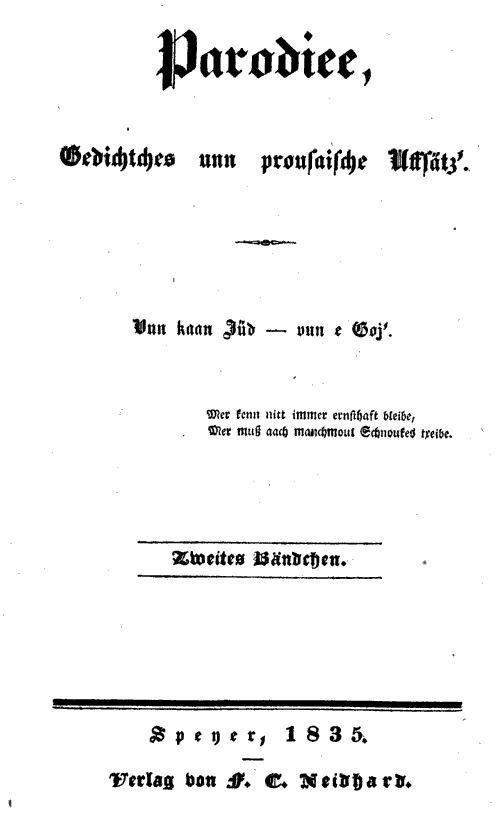
Title page of Christian Heinrich Gilardone's Lotegorisch book, Parodiee, Gedichtches unn prousaische Uffsätz'. Vun kaan Jüd – vun e Goj', 2. Bändchen, Speyer, 1835

Lotegorisch or Lottegorisch or Lekoudesch (older own description: lochne kodesch, from the Hebrew: laschon = "tongue, language", and kodesch = "holy") is a trading language and Palatine variant of the secret language, Rotwelsch, spoken in the Leiningerland (especially in Carlsberg), where in the late 18th century many vagrants, including many Jews, were settled and where many of them worked as cattle traders, itinerant craftsmen, and peddlers.

== Literature ==
- Anton Meißner: Die pfälzische Handelssprache Lotegorisch. Wörterbuch mit Leseproben. Meißner Verlag, Wattenheim, 1999 (printed as a manuscript)
