= Mesolithic in Switzerland =

Archaeological period in Switzerland from c. 9500 to 5500 BCE

- Geographical range: Switzerland
- Period: Mesolithic
- Dates: c. 9500–5500 BCE
- Preceded by: Epipaleolithic
- Followed by: Neolithic

The Mesolithic in Switzerland represents a crucial transitional period in Swiss prehistory, spanning from approximately 9500 to 5500 BCE. This archaeological period is characterized by the appearance and proliferation of very small arrow points called microliths, marking a significant shift from the preceding Epipaleolithic traditions to the emerging Neolithic agricultural societies.

The Mesolithic period in Switzerland is broadly divided into two chronological phases: the Early and Middle Mesolithic (9500–7000 BCE) and the Late and Final Mesolithic (7000–5500 BCE). During this time, hunter-gatherer societies adapted to the changing post-glacial environment of the Holocene, developing sophisticated technologies and complex territorial systems across the diverse Swiss landscape.

== History of research ==
The Mesolithic period was long considered a cultural regression between the prestigious Magdalenian civilization of the late Paleolithic and the revolutionary changes brought by the Neolithic. In Western Europe, and Switzerland in particular, this period remained poorly understood and was neglected by archaeological research for decades.

The first significant discovery occurred between 1926–1928 at Col-des-Roches (Le Locle), where a level was identified as "Azilo-Tardenoisian." However, systematic research only began in the 1950s–1960s with the pioneering work of René Wyss, who conducted excavations at Liesbergmühle (Liesberg), Robenhausen (Wetzikon), and in the Wauwil region. The publication of excavations at Birsmatten (Nenzlingen) by Hans-Georg Bandi in 1964 provided the foundation for a synthesis of Swiss Mesolithic culture.

In Western Switzerland, Michel Egloff's excavations at Ogens and Baulmes between 1964 and 1975 marked the beginning of Mesolithic research in the region. This was followed by the work of Gervaise Pignat and Pierre Crotti at Collombey-Muraz and Col du Mollendruz (Mont-la-Ville) between 1980 and 1991. By the early 21st century, renewed interest in the Mesolithic led to a reevaluation of the economic and social complexity of these post-glacial hunter-gatherer societies, with their role in the establishment of the Neolithic increasingly recognized as predominant.

== Chronology and regional subdivisions ==
Despite increased research activity, data remains very fragmentary regarding both chronology and the characterization of cultural and regional assemblages, which relies largely on typological analysis of microlithic armatures. Like these highly mobile hunter-gatherer groups, it appears increasingly evident that the boundaries between cultural groups were permeable and subject to fluctuations in space and time.

Recent research in the French Jura, near Lons-le-Saunier, demonstrates this complexity. At a single open-air site, two occupations with distinct typological assemblages succeeded each other within a relatively short time span: the first showing northern affinities (Beuronien), the second of southern origin (Sauveterrien). This example highlights the need for caution in defining cultural groups and their geographical boundaries based primarily on material culture aspects.

The transition from the Late Glacial to the Holocene, occurring around 9700 BCE, cannot be strictly considered the lower limit of the Mesolithic, as some assemblages with clearly Epipaleolithic typological characteristics date to the beginning of the Preboreal period (9700–9500 BCE). The Swiss Mesolithic, spanning the Preboreal, Boreal, and early Atlantic period, can be globally subdivided into two chronological phases.

=== Early and Middle Mesolithic (9500–7000 BCE) ===
The first phase of the Mesolithic is characterized by a wide range of arrow armatures, including geometric microliths (segments, triangles) accompanied by different types of micropoints. The Swiss Plateau, like the Saône-Rhône corridor, was at the crossroads of different cultural currents of distinct origin, following Rhenish or Rhodanian axes, with the Beuronien and Sauveterrien traditions overlapping local traditions inherited from the Epipaleolithic. The south of the Alps, from what little is known, fits within the cultural sphere of northern Italian Sauveterrien.

During the Early Mesolithic (9500–8000 BCE), in the northern Jura, central and eastern Switzerland, the development of Mesolithic groups followed a northern tradition, expressed in lithic industries by microlithic arrow armature spectra dominated by truncated points. In Western Switzerland, a Mesolithic facies developed with predominant southern, Sauveterrien influences, though Beuronien cultural elements were also present, as illustrated by occupation levels at the Col du Mollendruz shelter.

The Middle Mesolithic (8000–7000 BCE) provides more numerous evidence and better-defined cultural assemblages. Northern Switzerland, along with Franche-Comté and southern Germany, clearly belongs to the Beuronien current. Microlithic assemblages are characterized by the predominance of scalene triangles associated with retouched-base points, as seen at sites like Les Gripons (Clos du Doubs) and Ritzigrund (Roggenburg). Western Switzerland fits within the Sauveterrien complex, like Savoy and the southern Jura, with scalene triangles clearly dominating, accompanied by bilateral retouched points with rough bases.

=== Late and Final Mesolithic (7000–5500 BCE) ===
The Late Mesolithic is characterized, as in much of Europe, by the adoption of a new type of arrow armature: the trapeze. The debitage of siliceous rocks was modified, and blade tools became predominant, particularly the use of notched blades with irregular retouch, called Montbani blades. In the northern Jura and central Switzerland, the production of antler harpoons represents the most original factor in the bone industry.

The final phase of the Mesolithic is distinguished by the appearance of evolved armatures, particularly asymmetrical triangular "arrows" with concave bases, within a cultural context that remains poorly defined and chronologically uncertain in Switzerland. This phase, called the Final Mesolithic, could indicate the first interactions with Neolithic populations.

== Settlement and habitation ==
Knowledge of settlement organization remains very limited. It generally concerns rock shelters, which provide numerous chronological insights through their stratigraphy but often remain difficult to analyze spatially. Repeated prehistoric occupations make it difficult to individualize homogeneous, undisturbed living floors. However, at the Col du Mollendruz rock shelter, spatial analysis revealed several hearths for the Early and Middle Mesolithic, serving culinary or techno-economic functions, associated with different distinct activity zones dedicated to microlith manufacturing, flint knapping, fur working, or bone working. At the same site, several post holes attributed to the Late Mesolithic delimit a 7 m² area, remains of a tent or hut.

Open-air sites, less subject to repeated reoccupations, are better suited to provide information about habitation. However, natural phenomena such as erosion or poor preservation of certain remains, particularly bones, limit analysis and interpretation possibilities. For Switzerland, except for the Schötz 7 campsite in Lucerne, specialized in deer hunting and carcass processing without real habitat structures, no open-air site with favorable taphonomic conditions and recently excavated has yet been analyzed.

Regarding the geographical distribution of sites, all territory north of the Alps was occupied from the Early Mesolithic onward. This presence is characterized on the Plateau by a marked concentration of open-air camps along small lakes or on fluvial terraces, and in the Jura by assiduous use of rock shelters, even at altitude like near Col du Mollendruz (1100 m). In the Alpine sector, the heart of the massif, particularly in the high valleys of the Rhône and Rhine, occupations remain limited to the most external zones.

On the northern slope of the Alps, middle mountain sectors were utilized up to about 1500 m, as demonstrated by recent discoveries in the western Pre-Alps, in Gruyère (Charmey, Bellegarde/Jaun), in Pays-d'Enhaut (Château-d'Œx, Rougemont) and in the Bernese communes of Saanen and Boltigen. South of the Alps, seasonal occupations of high mountain zones up to over 2000 m can be supposed, as suggested by site presence on the southern slope of the Splügen Pass, and residential camps in valley bottoms, as at Tec Nev (Mesocco). In 2003, several open-air sites were discovered at Simplon Pass (municipality of Simplon).

== Economy and way of life ==
To understand the functioning and economic organization of hunter-gatherer societies, two intimately linked concepts are fundamental: mobility and territory. Groups moved regularly throughout the year according to their economic needs, making archaeological sites only one element of the annually traveled territory, a simple marker offering only a partial vision of prehistoric reality. Sites could fulfill various functions or be occupied in different seasons.

Mesolithic hunter-gatherers exploited multiple and diversified supply sources from varied sectors of their natural environment to reduce risks of shortage or famine by avoiding overexploitation of particular territorial resources. Site positioning often characterizes this diversification strategy. The Collombey-Muraz shelter perfectly illustrates this: placed at the junction of two biotopes, it allowed joint exploitation of aquatic resources from the Rhône plain (trout, duck, beaver, turtle, mollusks) and those of the forested hinterland for hunting large mammals (deer, wild boar, roe deer, bear) or small fur game (wildcat, fox, badger, marten).

Resource diversity is expressed in archaeological excavations through the wide range of bones preserved in occupation layers. However, this strategy did not imply exclusive or even priority consumption of meat products. Ethnological studies demonstrate the crucial importance of plant products in hunter-gatherer economies, primarily for food but also for medical or craft purposes (wood, fibers, resins). These products are almost never preserved in prehistoric sites. The abundance of carbonized hazelnut shells in all contemporary Boreal layers is one of the rare tangible witnesses to Mesolithic exploitation of the plant world.

Determining the provenance of siliceous raw materials used for manufacturing stone tools and weapons provides insight into Mesolithic group economic territories. Most of these materials were likely collected during other subsistence activities and necessary movements. On this basis, territory dimensions can be roughly estimated at 2000 to 4000 km².

Groups of probably quite restricted size, moving within well-defined territories, did not live in isolation. They maintained various types of relationships with neighbors, expressed through exchanges of different natures, few of which left traces. Ornament object circulation provides one rare illustration. This practice is attested from the Upper Paleolithic. During the Mesolithic, the diffusion of Columbella rustica pendants from Mediterranean coasts along the Rhodanian axis reveals these long-distance exchanges. The discovery at Ritzigrund of perforated fossil Bayana shells from the Paris Basin reveals another diffusion network.

== Funerary practices ==
The only known Mesolithic burial in Switzerland is that of Birsmatten (Nenzlingen). According to conclusions from a data reexamination, the burial could be attributed to stratigraphic ensemble H3, dated between 7500 and 7000 BCE. Anthropological analysis identifies the deceased as a woman of about forty years, of average height (160 cm).

Analysis of cremation evidence from excavations at the Collombey-Muraz rock shelter demonstrates that cremation did not take place on site and that burned bones were carefully gathered before being deposited in a basin, arranged in a level dated to the first half of the 8th millennium. This was an adult whose sex and age could not be determined.

More broadly, even though evidence remains scarce, Mesolithic funerary practices show great diversity. Other examples in Western Europe indicate, in addition to cremation, new ways of treating the dead, with the appearance of collective burials and secondary burials, where bones are deposited after the corpse spent time elsewhere. These practices all involve manipulation and movement of corpses or bones during complex funerary rituals.

== End of the Mesolithic ==
In Switzerland, rare chronological data on the transition from the Final Mesolithic to the Early Neolithic allow it to be placed, conventionally and certainly provisionally, around the middle of the 6th millennium BCE. Since late 20th-century research, the hypothesis of brutal disappearance of Mesolithic hunter-gatherer societies before the inexorable advance of new agricultural-pastoral populations progressively colonizing the European continent has been refuted by archaeological data, including in Switzerland. It appears that indigenous populations actively participated in this slow process of social and economic change, and that certain traits of their cultural identity persisted beyond this transformation.

== See also ==
- Paleolithic in Switzerland
- Neolithic in Switzerland

== Bibliography ==
- La Suisse du Paléolithique à l'aube du Moyen-Age, 1, 1993, 203–243
- G. Pignat, A. Winiger, Les occupations mésolithiques de l'abri du Mollendruz, 1998
- Ph. Della Casa, Mesolcina praehistorica, 2000
- Premiers hommes dans les Alpes, catalogue d'exposition Sion, 2002
- L. Braillard et al., «Préalpes et chasseurs-cueilleurs en terres fribourgeoises», in Cahiers d'archéologie fribourgeoise, 5, 2003, 42–71
- R. Huber, «Oberschan-Moos, eine frühmesolithische Fundstelle in der Gemeinde Wartau», in Wartau, dir. M. Primas et al., 2, 2004, 159–195
- J. Bullinger et al., «Les chasseurs-cueilleurs du Paléolithique et du Mésolithique», in Des Alpes au Léman, dir. A. Gallay, 2006, 49–97 E.H. Nielsen, Paläolithikum und Mesolithikum in der Zentralschweiz. Mensch und Umwelt zwischen 17'000 und 5500 v.Chr., 2009
