= Grotte du Bichon =

Cave and archaeological site in Switzerland

Coordinates: 47.15032484174889°N 6.850009727850308°E

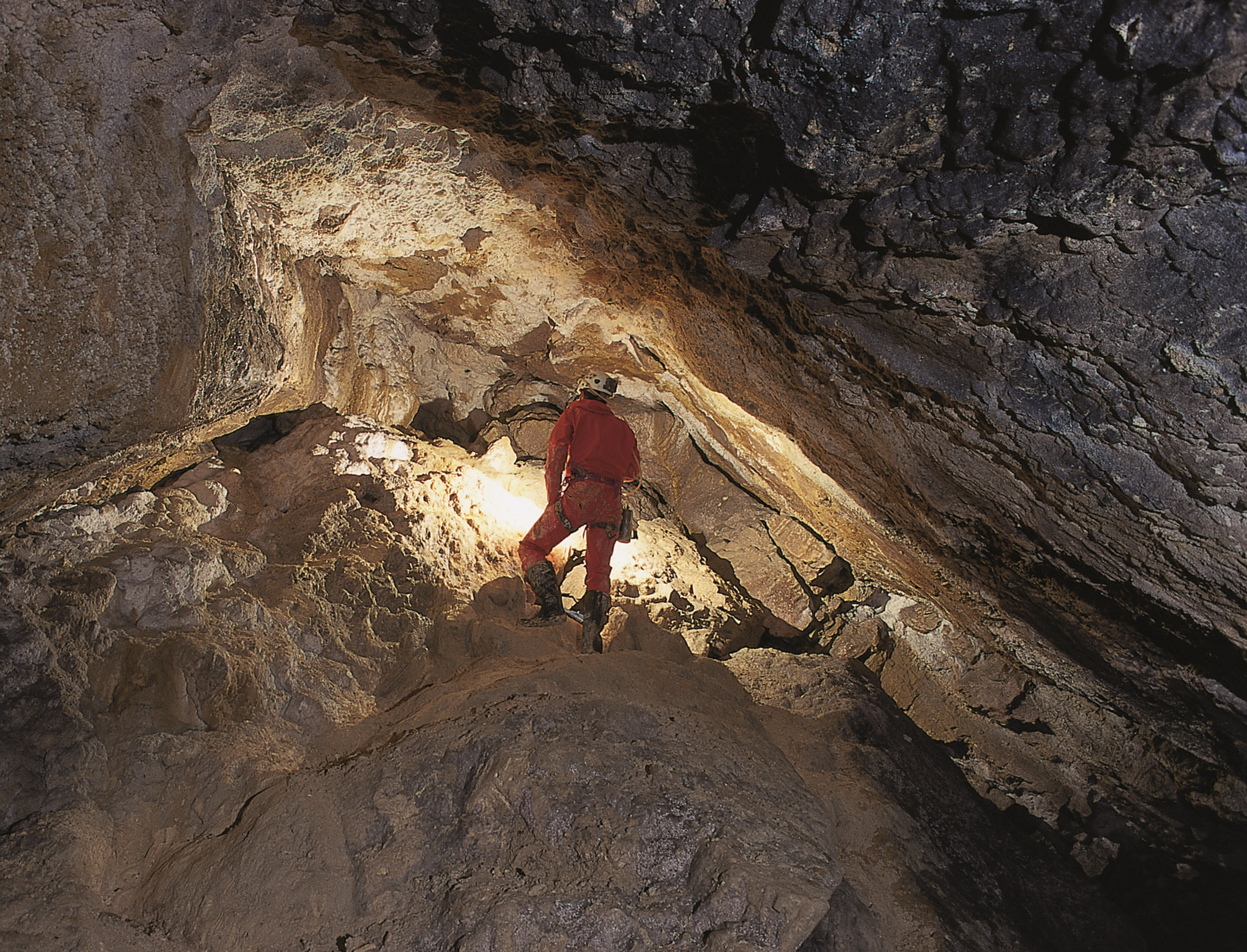

- Location within Switzerland Location within Canton of Neuchâtel
- Location: La Chaux-de-Fonds; Canton of Neuchâtel; Switzerland
- Elevation: 846 m (2,776 ft)
- Geology: Karst cave

Grotte du Bichon is a karstic cave in the Swiss Jura, overlooking the river Doubs at an elevation of 846 m (2,776 ft), some 5 km (3 mi) north of La Chaux-de-Fonds. It is the site of the discovery of the skeleton of a hunter-gatherer of the Azilian (late Upper Paleolithic to early Mesolithic), dubbed "Bichon man" (homme de Bichon).

== Prehistoric remains ==
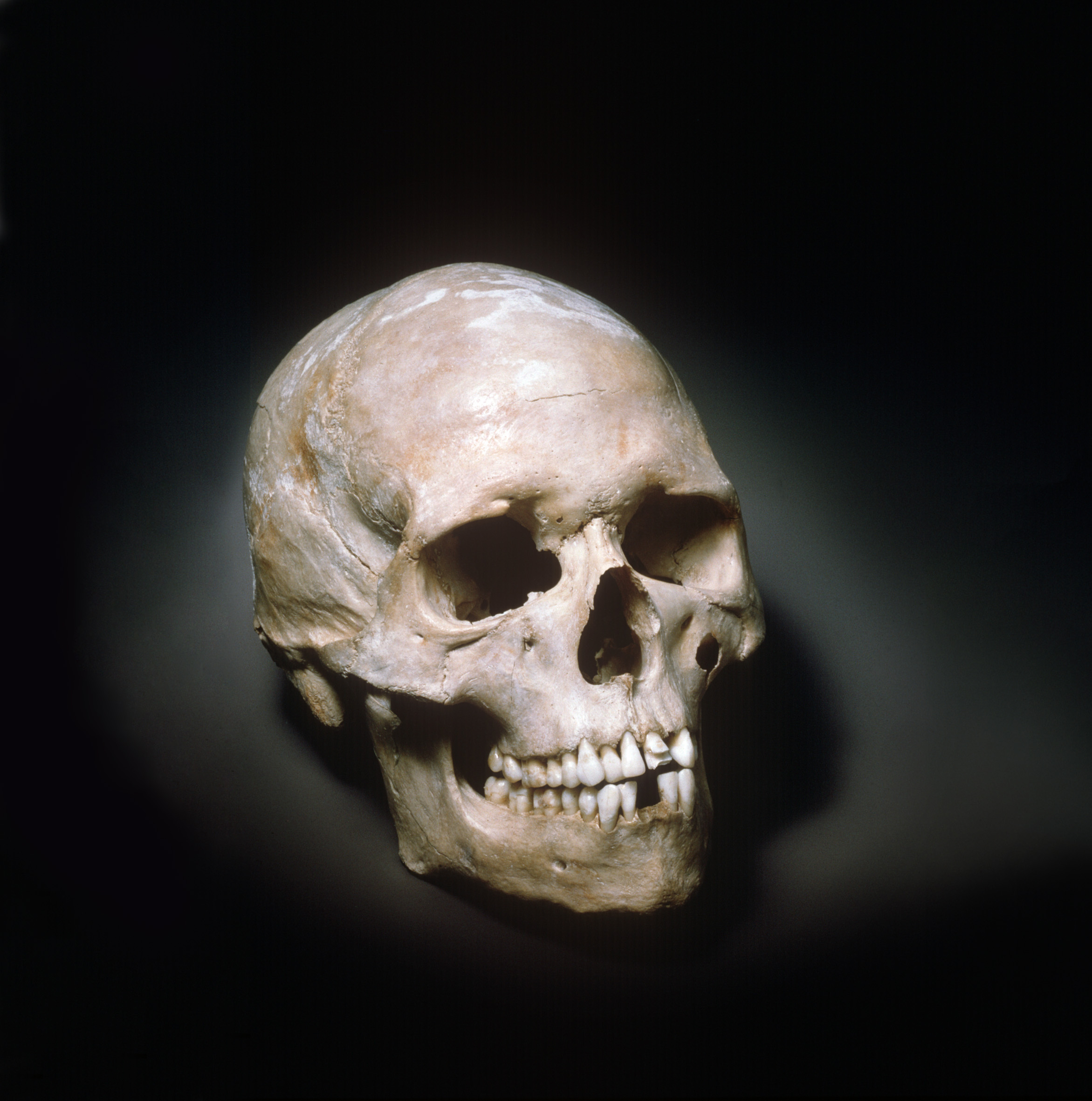
Skull of the "Bichon man", discovered in Grotte du Bichon (exhibited at Laténium)

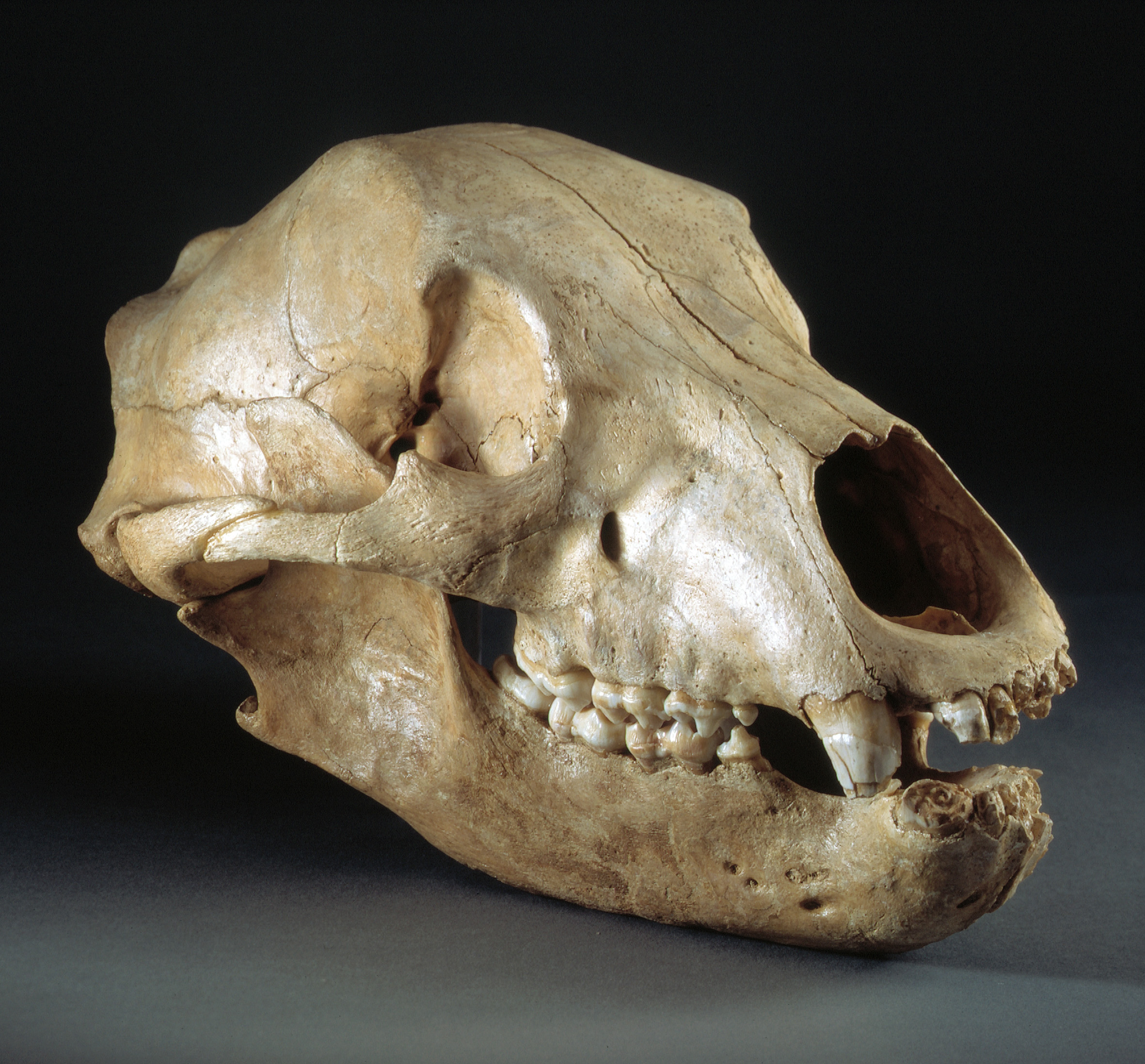
Bear skull found in Grotte du Bichon (Laténium)

The "Bichon man" (French: homme de Bichon) was a young male about 20 to 23 years old, carbon dated to 13,770–13,560 years ago (95% CI). The skeleton was discovered in 1956, about 15 m (49 ft) from the cave entrance, intermingled with the bones of a female brown bear, nine flint arrowheads and traces of charcoal. In 1991, flint chips were found embedded in the bear's third vertebra, without indication of healing, suggesting the interpretation that the bear was wounded by arrows, retreated into the cave, and was pursued by the hunter, who made a fire to fumigate the bear from the cave, but was killed by the dying animal.

A genetic analysis on the remains of the man showed he belonged to the "West European Hunter-Gatherer" lineage (WHG), known from younger fossils of the European Mesolithic. He was a bearer of Y-DNA haplogroup I2a and of mt-DNA haplogroup U5b1h. Y-DNA haplogroup I2a probably arose in Europe prior to the Last Glacial Maximum. Morphologically, his skull was described as relatively long, with a low face and subrectangular eye-sockets. He would have weighed just above 60 kg (130 lb) at a height of 1.64 m (5 ft 5 in). He was relatively slender, but muscular (based on muscle attachments visible on the skeleton), with a pronounced lateral asymmetry suggesting right-handedness. A study on carbon and nitrogen fractionations suggests a largely meat-based diet.

== See also ==
- List of caves in Switzerland
- Mesolithic in Switzerland
- Paleolithic in Switzerland
