= Sieben Hengste =

Mountain in Switzerland

- Chibe
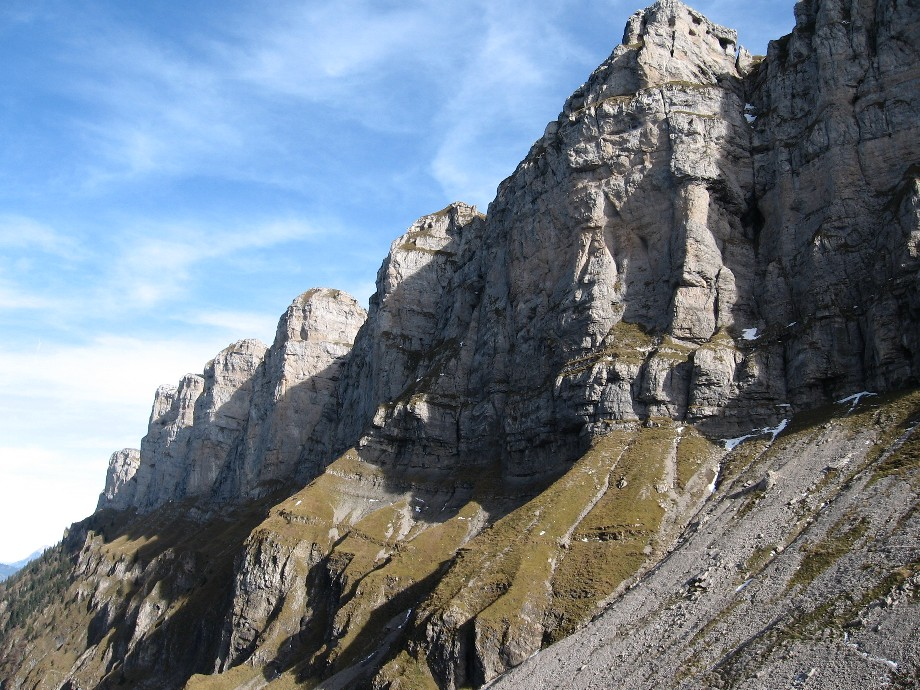
- The west side

Highest point
- Elevation: 1,955 m (6,414 ft)
- Prominence: 184 m (604 ft)
- Parent peak: Burgfeldstand
- Coordinates: 46°44′58″N 7°48′28″E

Geography
- Location within Switzerland
- Location: Bern, Switzerland
- Parent range: Emmental Alps

The Sieben Hengste is a mountain of the Emmental Alps, located north of Habkern, in the canton of Bern. It is composed of several summits of which the highest (1,955 metres) is named Chibe.

== See also ==
- Siebenhengste-Hohgant-Höhle
- List of mountains of Switzerland
