= Hohgant =

Mountain of the Swiss Alps

- Furggengütsch
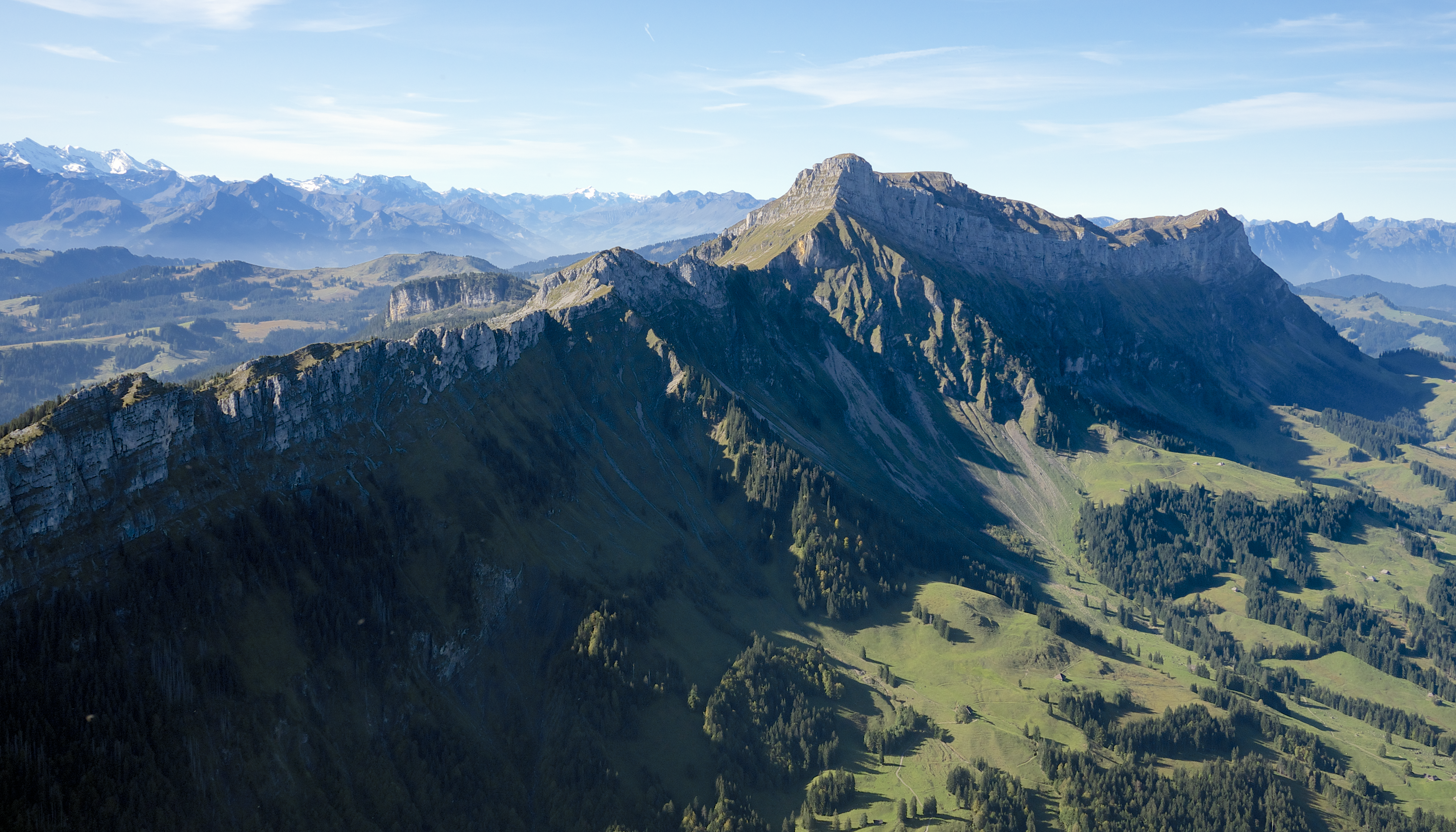
- The north side of the Hohgant

Highest point
- Elevation: 2,197 m (7,208 ft)
- Prominence: 638 m (2,093 ft)
- Parent peak: Brienzer Rothorn
- Coordinates: 46°47′17.4″N 7°54′06.6″E

Geography
- Location within Switzerland
- Location: Bern, Switzerland
- Parent range: Emmental Alps

The Hohgant is a mountain of the Emmental Alps, located south of the Emmental in the canton of Bern. The main summit has an elevation of 2,197 metres above sea level and is distinguished by the name Furggengütsch.

Several caves (F1 and K2 networks) developing in the Urgonian limestone formation (Aptian) have their entrances on the Hohgant mountain. The F1 cave is connected to the Siebenhengste cave network.

== Gallery ==
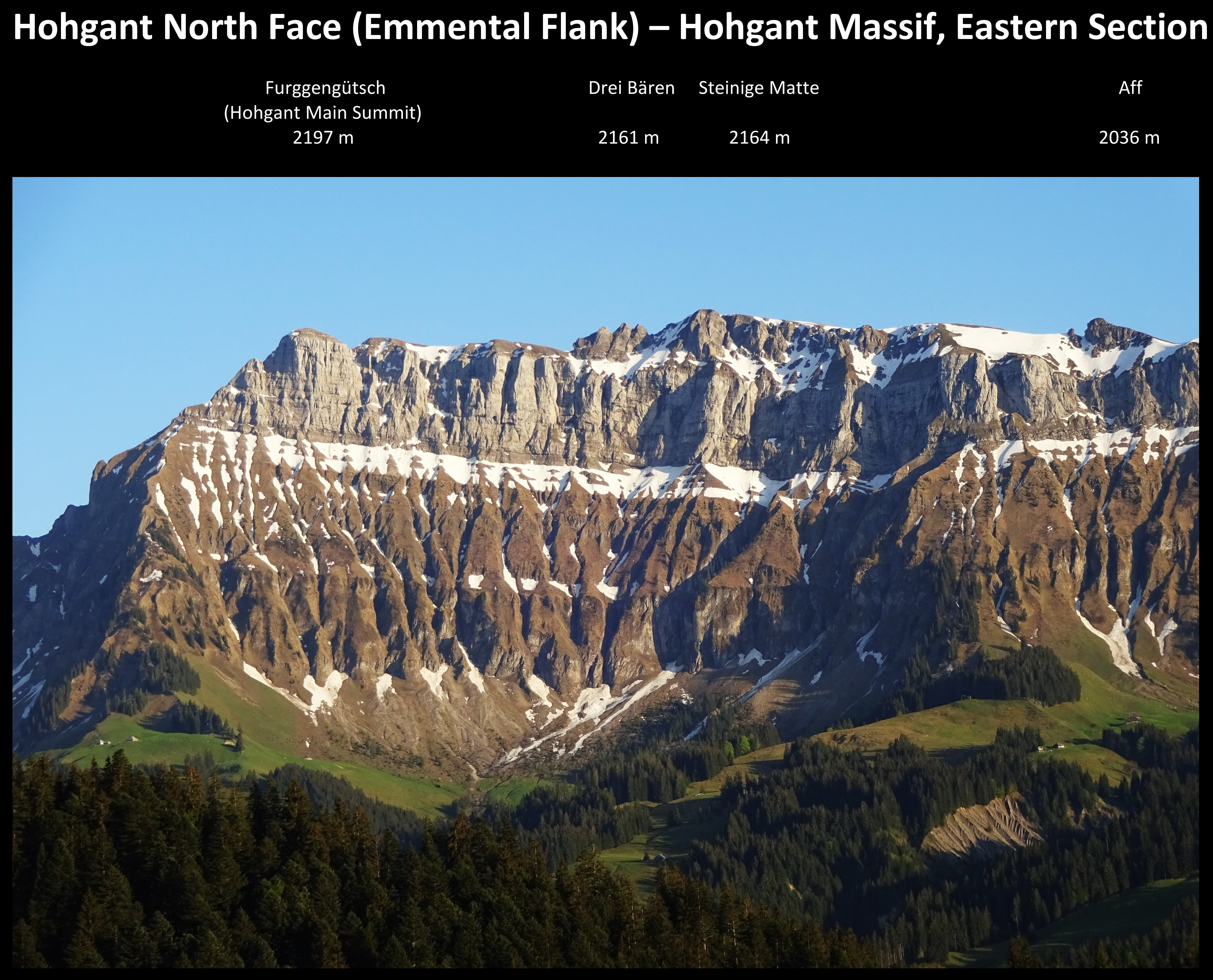
Eastern section with main summit Furggengütsch (to the left)

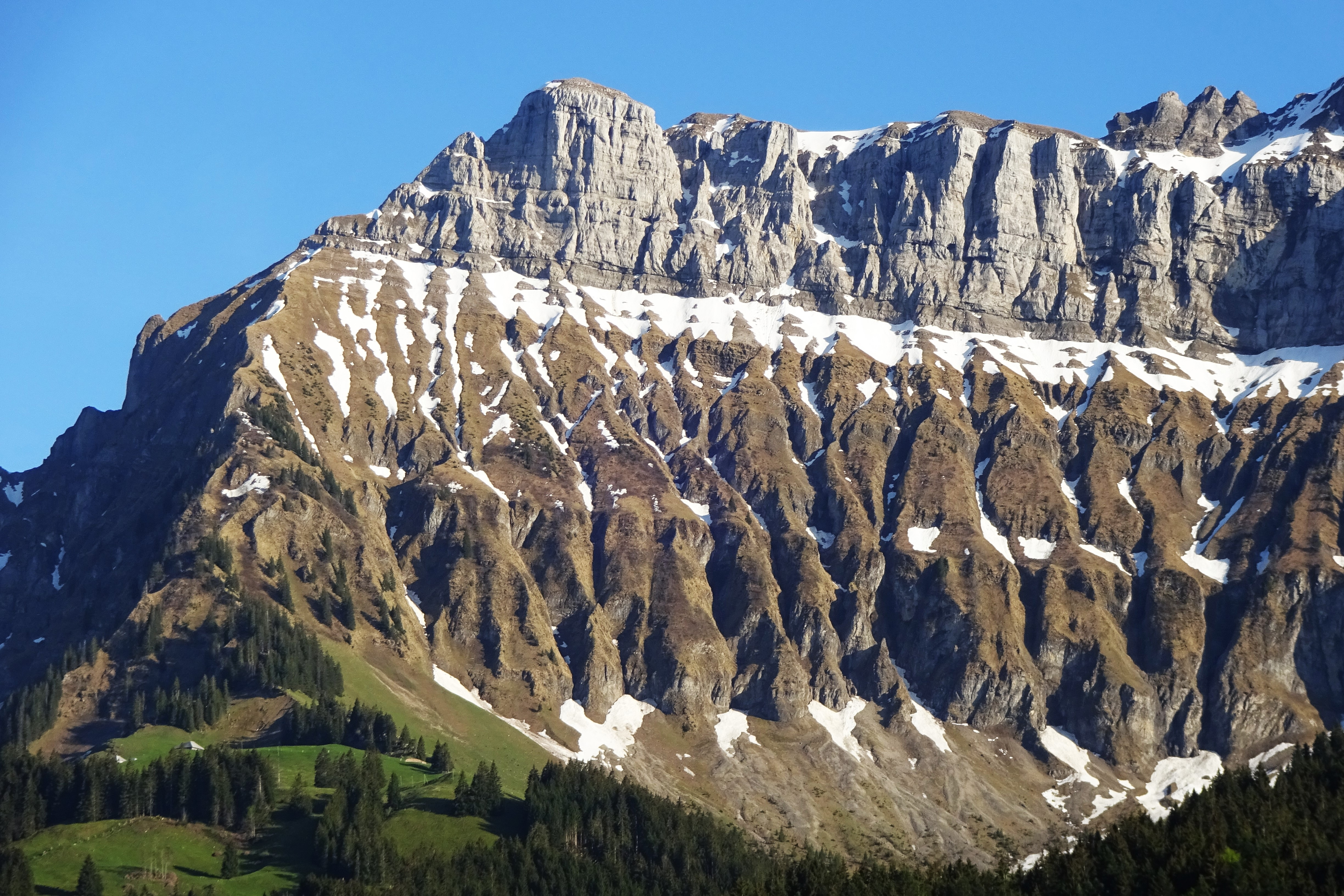
Eastern end with main summit Furggengütsch (left of centre) & "Drei Bären / The Three Bears" (to the right)

== See also ==
- Siebenhengste-Hohgant-Höhle
