= Paleolithic Switzerland =

Prehistoric period in Switzerland from earliest human occupation to c. 12,000 years ago

Paleolithic in Switzerland
- Locations of major Paleolithic sites in Switzerland
- Geographical range: Switzerland and neighboring regions
- Period: Paleolithic
- Dates: c. 1,500,000 – 12,000 years ago
- Major sites: Bichon, Cotencher, Kesslerloch, Schweizersbild, Wildkirchli
- Followed by: Mesolithic

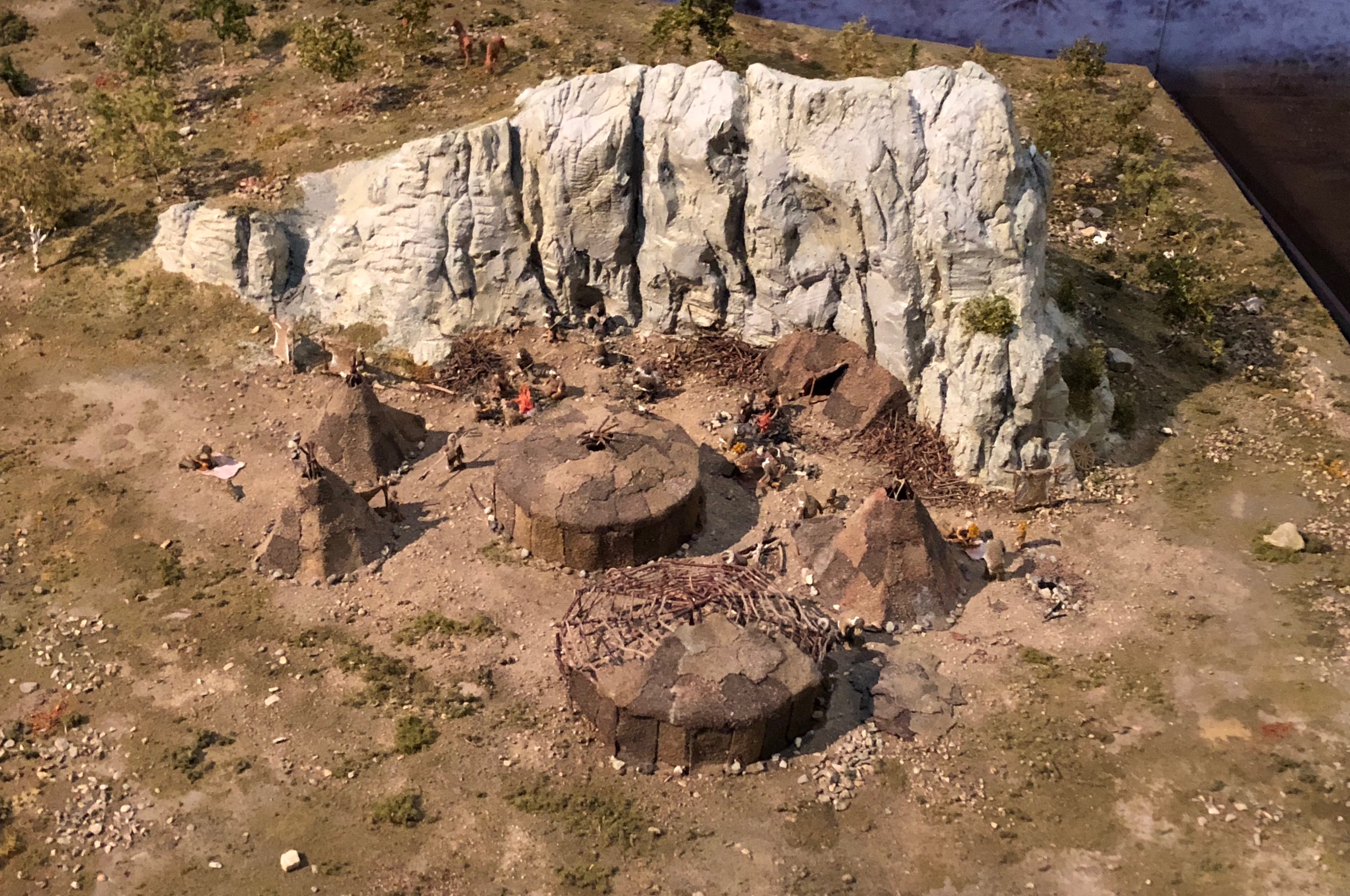
Model of the Upper Paleolithic (Magdalenian) habitation ("camp site") Schweizersbild

The Paleolithic in Switzerland encompasses the longest prehistoric period in the region, spanning from the earliest human occupation around 1.5 million years ago until approximately 12,000 years ago (Pleistocene epoch).

The term "Paleolithic," coined in 1865 by British naturalist John Lubbock, originally distinguished the "Old Stone Age" of chipped stone tools from the "New Stone Age" (Neolithic) of polished stone implements. In modern understanding, these periods represent fundamentally different ways of life: Paleolithic peoples were mobile predators who subsisted through hunting, fishing, and gathering, while Neolithic populations adopted sedentary lifestyles based on agriculture and animal husbandry.

The Swiss Paleolithic record is particularly challenging to study due to the region's geological instability during the Quaternary period. The alternation of more than twenty major glacial and interglacial stages caused cyclical accumulation and erosion patterns, especially in mountainous regions, leading to the destruction of most early Paleolithic remains. This climatic conditioning makes Swiss prehistory more fragmentary than in other European regions.

== Chronological framework ==
The Paleolithic period in Switzerland and neighboring regions is divided into four main phases: Archaic, Lower (or Ancient), Middle, and Upper Paleolithic.

- The Archaic Paleolithic began with the first human arrival in the Rhine and Rhône basins, likely before 1.5 million years ago. This period is characterized by cultures using roughly retouched stone flakes or pebbles worked on one or two faces, often termed "Pebble Culture." It corresponds to the Early Pleistocene and conventionally ends with a major paleomagnetic reversal dated to approximately 780,000 years ago. The earliest human remains discovered in Europe belong to the end of this period and represent an archaic form of Homo erectus known as Homo antecessor.
- The Lower Paleolithic (c. 800,000–300,000 years ago) saw the persistence of archaic industries alongside the emergence of the first Acheulean biface cultures. This period corresponds geologically to the Middle Pleistocene and the development of early pre-Neanderthals, grouped under the general type of Heidelberg Man or Homo heidelbergensis.
- The Middle Paleolithic (c. 300,000–35,000 years ago) corresponds to the development of new stone-knapping technology, known as the Levallois technique. This method allowed for the predetermination of flake shapes, providing lighter and more rapidly manufactured tools. The period is subdivided into Early Middle Paleolithic (pre-Neanderthals) and Late Middle Paleolithic (classic Neanderthals), beginning with the penultimate interglacial period around 130,000 years ago. Only this second part, encompassing cultures generally termed Mousterian, is well-attested in Switzerland.
- The Upper Paleolithic (c. 35,000–12,000 years ago) represents the era of modern humans (Homo sapiens) in Europe, represented by the Cro-Magnon type. This period ended with the last glacial epoch and is often called the "Reindeer Age" due to the predominance of reindeer hunting. In Switzerland, early Upper Paleolithic cultures are unknown due to erosion caused by the last major glacial advance (22,000–18,000 years ago). The Magdalenian culture (18,000–12,000 years ago) is therefore the only well-attested Upper Paleolithic complex in Switzerland.

== Lower Paleolithic ==
=== Archaic cultures without handaxes ===
Although traces of the earliest cultures have disappeared, several indicators suggest human presence in Switzerland before 500,000 years ago. The oldest well-dated human traces in nearby regions are located in France (Saône-Rhône corridor, Auvergne, Provence) and Italy (Po Plain), with the earliest occupations dating back over one million years. These typically consist of open-air stations near water sources. North of the Alsace plain, at Achenheim (Bas-Rhin), worked pebbles dated to over 500,000 years ago have been found through geological observations. In the Alsatian Sundgau, isolated finds attest to human passage at the foot of the Jura at a very early period. Numerous worked pebbles have also been found in northwestern Switzerland and the Berthoud region, though their dating remains uncertain.

=== Acheulean handaxe cultures ===
In Switzerland, the Acheulean is represented only by a few typical specimens discovered fortuitously without controlled excavations. The Pratteln handaxe, discovered in 1974 on the south slope of the Rhine valley, is particularly thick and morphologically comparable to French Early Acheulean handaxes. Based on its stratigraphic position and morphology, this object can be dated to at least 400,000 years ago. The Schlieren handaxe, found in 1954 without recorded observations, is a large specimen with a pointed tip, concave edges, and unfinished base. Its state of preservation suggests minimal displacement and that its discovery location corresponds to an Acheulean station.

The Homo antecessor and its pre-Neanderthal descendants evolved slowly during the Lower Paleolithic. These skilled hunters, capable of killing large animals, lived in small groups and settled either in open air on dominant positions allowing good territorial observation, or in cave entrances and cavities near water sources. Around 400,000 years ago, the discovery of fire use constituted an essential step. From this period, habitat organization is observed, with humans constructing rudimentary dwellings including hearths, knapping workshop areas, and clear separation between interior and exterior spaces. These nomadic hunters spent little time at these sites, explaining the small quantity of recovered objects.

== Middle Paleolithic ==
=== The Neanderthal period (130,000–35,000 years ago) ===
In Switzerland, the Middle Paleolithic corresponds to the first well-attested period of generalized prehistoric occupation. The transition from Lower to Middle Paleolithic is poorly known, though some open-air stations that are difficult to date may belong to this period. These include isolated discoveries of Micoquian bifaces in the Fricktal region (Möhlin, Zeiningen, Magden). Late Middle Paleolithic sites are characterized by the predominant use of flakes as tool blanks. By convention, all these industries are designated as Mousterian. This complex is usually subdivided into facies defined by knapping techniques and tool group proportions.

Sites become relatively numerous in France's lower Rhône valley from around 80,000 years ago. Maximum expansion of Mousterian groups occurred shortly before their extinction between 50,000 and 35,000 years ago, when most Swiss sites likely date. However, some open-air stations with typological characteristics recalling older Rhône valley groups are difficult to date precisely.

Mousterian deposits are distributed in three main groups: open-air stations in the northwest, cave and rock shelter habitats in the Jura, and high-elevation sites in Alpine regions. Open-air stations are rare and limited to the Jura arc. In the Basel region, they are situated on the edges of middle and high Rhine and Birs terraces at altitudes between 300 and 350 metres (980 and 1,150 ft). These represent brief hunter stops along rivers, particularly at tributary valley mouths. In the Löwenbourg region, limestone outcrops provide very high-quality flint, conditioning tool and weapon manufacture for hunting and prey processing. The Löwenbourg area likely served multiple functions, occupying a particular site at 570 metres (1,870 ft) elevation on a spur dominating the Lucelle valley and forming a small, south-facing plateau with gentle slopes. This suggests establishment of fairly durable habitats, at least during favorable seasons, due to favorable topographic conditions and the presence of raw materials, water, and game.

Cave and rock shelter deposits are distributed at medium altitudes between 350 and 700 metres (1,150 and 2,300 ft), except for some high-altitude caves like Les Plaints (Couvet). Less numerous than in Franche-Comté, where the reference site for Jura Mousterian culture is found at Baume de Gigny, sites are concentrated in the Birs region and lower areas on foothills south of Neuchâtel. The Cotencher cave remains the major site of Swiss Mousterian culture more than a century after its discovery. Its rich fauna consists of an association of very different animals that could not coexist in any known natural environment today, suggesting great landscape variety and a mosaic of relatively contrasted ecosystems where frozen steppe could border forest refuges.

=== Alpine Mousterian question ===
Until the early 20th century, the Alpine massif was unanimously thought to have been colonized very late. The 1904 discovery by Emil Bächler of a high-altitude Paleolithic deposit in the Säntis massif (Alpstein) generated considerable interest. Excavations at Wildkirchli cave and Drachenloch led Bächler to develop theories about Paleolithic bear hunters who practiced hunting and sacrifice cults. Most of these hypotheses have now been abandoned, as these high-altitude caves primarily served as refuges for cave bears (Ursus spelaeus). Around the Alpine arc perimeter, numerous caves at varying altitudes from 600 to 2,000 metres (2,000 to 6,600 ft) or higher experienced Middle Paleolithic occupation.

Four main site groups can be distinguished: the Säntis region (Wildkirchli 1,477 m /4,846 ft, Wildenmannlisloch 1,628 m /5,341 ft, and Drachenloch 2,445 m /8,022 ft); the Bernese Oberland (Schnurenloch 1,230 m /4,040 ft, Chilchlihöhle 1,810 m /5,940 ft, and Ranggiloch 1,845 m /6,053 ft); Haute-Savoie and the Onnion region (several caves around 1,200 m /3,900 ft altitude); and the Orta region near Como, south of Ticino (Monfenera 670 m /2,200 ft, Buco del Piombo 695 m /2,280 ft). Due to altitude and intense frost action in sedimentary layers, artifacts have been completely disfigured by natural pressures. This particular morphology, caused by natural actions, gives all these industries an identical appearance that led many prehistorians to consider the existence of a culture particular to Alpine regions, termed "Alpine Paleolithic" or "Alpine Mousterian."

All Alpine deposits share poverty of toolkits. Humans generally used local hard rocks; at Wildkirchli, flakes were knapped from fairly good quality quartzites. Among recognizable pieces are Levallois flakes, scrapers, notched pieces, and denticulates. This represents genuine Mousterian culture, though insufficient material prevents group definition. In Switzerland, Neanderthal remains, though limited, allow interesting conclusions. In such a small region, at least two Neanderthal types are represented and likely succeeded each other: one Mediterranean type dated around 40,000 years ago (Grotte de Cotencher), the other much more robust classic type dated around 30,000 years ago (Saint-Brais). These Neanderthals were close to definitive extinction and may represent residual populations in territories that Cro-Magnon bearers of new Upper Paleolithic cultures had not yet discovered or deemed necessary to exploit.

== Upper Paleolithic: The Magdalenian ==
=== Early development ===
In regions near Switzerland, in France and southern Germany, the Upper Paleolithic began around 35,000 years ago. Except for the Châtelperronian, limited to France and seemingly the last Neanderthal culture, all subsequent civilizations were created by Cro-Magnon humans (Homo sapiens sapiens). Swiss Upper Paleolithic reduces to only the Magdalenian (18,000–12,000 years ago). The Rhine valley likely constituted a privileged passage zone between Danubian Central Europe and Atlantic Europe during early Upper Paleolithic. Aurignacian and Gravettian cultures are well-attested near northern borders in the Swabian Jura.

Most Swiss Magdalenian sites are located on the Jura Mountains arc between Geneva and Schaffhausen. Some stations, including very important ones like Moosseedorf-Moosbühl, indicate Plateau penetration, while others reach the Prealps up to altitudes near 1,000 metres (3,300 ft). Colonization of territories freed by glacial retreat occurred from more temperate regions where humans had taken refuge. Overall, migration came from the west, from Magdalenian centers in eastern France. Due to barriers created by the gigantic Rhône glacier in the Geneva basin, the first Magdalenians began conquering these new spaces through ice-free northwestern Switzerland, then followed the High Rhine to Lake Constance and Jura edges into Neuchâtel territory.

=== Early Dryas I (18,000–14,000 years ago) ===
Study of major current lake formation and fluctuations shows glacial melting was well underway 18,000 years ago. Magdalenian occupation is first attested in the Birs valley at Kastelhöhe. The middle layer of this deposit, dated around 18,000 years ago, yielded Early Magdalenian industry characterized by toolkits still frequently made on flakes. This period's end corresponds to Middle Magdalenian with triangles and undecorated half-round rods, possibly represented at Birseck-Ermitage. Fauna found at this level is distinctly glacial with steppe landscapes.

=== Late Dryas I (Pre-Bölling, 14,000–13,000 years ago) ===
This represents the first major stage of Swiss Magdalenian settlement. From Schaffhausen and Birs valley centers, deposits multiply and diversify. Humans occupy smaller valleys and begin establishing settlements up to approximately 500 metres (1,600 ft) altitude. Hunting is varied, with sites specialized in small game (snow partridge, variable hare, arctic fox), mountain species (ibex), or large herd hunting (reindeer, horse). This first colonization phase is certainly linked to Bölling climatic improvement, though cold fauna had not yet disappeared. Cultures from this period correspond to classic Upper Magdalenian.

The famous Kesslerloch cave presents complex stratigraphy extending across the entire Upper Magdalenian. Numerous short spear points with long bevels still evoke French Magdalenian III, while single-barbed harpoons link to Magdalenian V. Associated fauna, including mammoth, woolly rhinoceros, and musk ox, disappeared from Switzerland before the Bölling oscillation around 13,000 BCE. The second part of this period corresponds to rapid Upper Magdalenian expansion from 13,500 BCE, characterized by abundant backed bladelets. While lithic toolkits show much analogy with Kesslerloch, bone toolkits are much poorer.

=== Bölling and Allerød (13,000–12,000 years ago) ===
The following climatic improvement phase led to important vegetation changes from steppe to rapidly arborescent. The Bölling interstadial is well marked by rapid development of juniper and arboreal birches. Human expansion continues, particularly at altitude. Middle Country colonization begins with settlement between Alps and Jura in the Bernese region. Magdalenians from Savoie penetrate the Geneva region and reach Lake Geneva's extremity. During this period, classic Upper Magdalenians persist while new groups appear with lithic assemblages characterized by angular-backed points and Hamburgian notched points.

Around 12,500 BCE, Scots pine, previously discrete, developed rapidly, marking the beginning of the Allerød. Reindeer disappeared while forest species developed (deer, roe deer, wild boar). This period appears mainly as a phase of landscape conquest by forest, during which other hunters, less numerous than Magdalenians, occupied Jura borders. These included Azilian groups or related cultures. The remains of an Azilian man were described in 2014 from Grotte du Bichon, near La Chaux-de-Fonds.

== Paleolithic art ==
Figurative or ornamental artistic manifestations testify to prehistoric humans' symbolic thought evolution. Upper Magdalenian art is limited to mobile objects. Despite active speleological research, no caves decorated with paintings or engravings have been reported in Switzerland. Currently, adding the Petersfels (Baden-Württemberg) and Veyrier (Haute-Savoie) stations to Swiss territory, only eight Magdalenian deposits have yielded art objects beyond simple usual adornment or weakly decorated utilitarian objects. Two sites certainly belong to the earliest Upper Magdalenian epoch: Kesslerloch and Freudenthal caves; others correspond to middle or final Upper Magdalenian.

The classic Kesslerloch deposit yielded about forty remarkably decorated mobile art pieces plus numerous bones bearing non-figurative traces. Most figurations appear on utilitarian objects (nine spear-throwers, seven rods, four perforated sticks). Remaining objects include engraved reindeer antler or bone fragments, elongated spindle-shaped sculptures, two engraved lignite plaques, and an enigmatic sculpture (possibly an insect) in jet. Beyond the musk ox head, probably a spear-thrower element, Kesslerloch's most famous piece remains the perforated stick decorated with a reindeer published by Konrad Merk in 1874.

The neighboring Petersfels and Schweizersbild deposits yielded most late Upper Magdalenian art works. Other figurations come from Rislisberghöhle, Neuchâtel-Monruz, and Veyrier. Late Magdalenian art differs from the previous phase through greater representation stylization. Multiple subjects on the same support become more numerous and may be figured in superposition, as on the Schweizersbild limestone plaque engraved with three horses and five cervids. Most importantly, late Upper Magdalenian art in Switzerland is characterized by jet female figurines of the Petersfels-Monruz type. Reduced to extreme schematization, these very small statuettes are usually perforated where the head should be located but is never figured. They must have possessed very important symbolic significance.

== See also ==
- Early history of Switzerland
- Mesolithic in Switzerland
- Neolithic in Switzerland

== Bibliography ==
- Bosinski, Gerhard (1982). Die Kunst der Eiszeit in Deutschland und in der Schweiz (in German). R. Habelt. p. 92. ISBN 978-3774918320.
- Müller-Beck, Hansjürgen; Albrecht, Gerd, eds. (1987). Die Anfänge der Kunst vor 30000 Jahren (in German). Theiss in Herder. p. 124. ISBN 978-3806205084.
- Burga, Conradin A.; Perret, Roger, eds. (1998). Vegetation und Klima der Schweiz seit dem jüngeren Eiszeitalter (in German). Ott. p. 832. ISBN 978-3722567907.
- Le Tensorer, Jean-Marie (1998). Mollon, Jérôme (ed.). Le Paléolithique en Suisse. Homme Des Origines (in French). Vol. 5. p. 504. ISBN 2841370631.
- Monbaron, Michel; Gobat, Jean-Michel; Le Tensorer, Jean-Marie (1998). "Paysage calcaire de l'arc jurassien". Cahiers du Musée d'histoire naturelle de La Chaux-de-Fonds (in French). 7: 109. ISBN 978-2-88423-033-9.
- Müller, Werner; Cattin, Marie-Isabelle; Leesch, Denise (2004). Hauterive-Champréveyres et Neuchâtel-Monruz. Témoins d'implantations magdaléniennes et aziliennes sur la rive nord du lac de Neuchâtel (in French). p. 237. ISBN 2-940347-27-1.
