= List of caves in Switzerland =

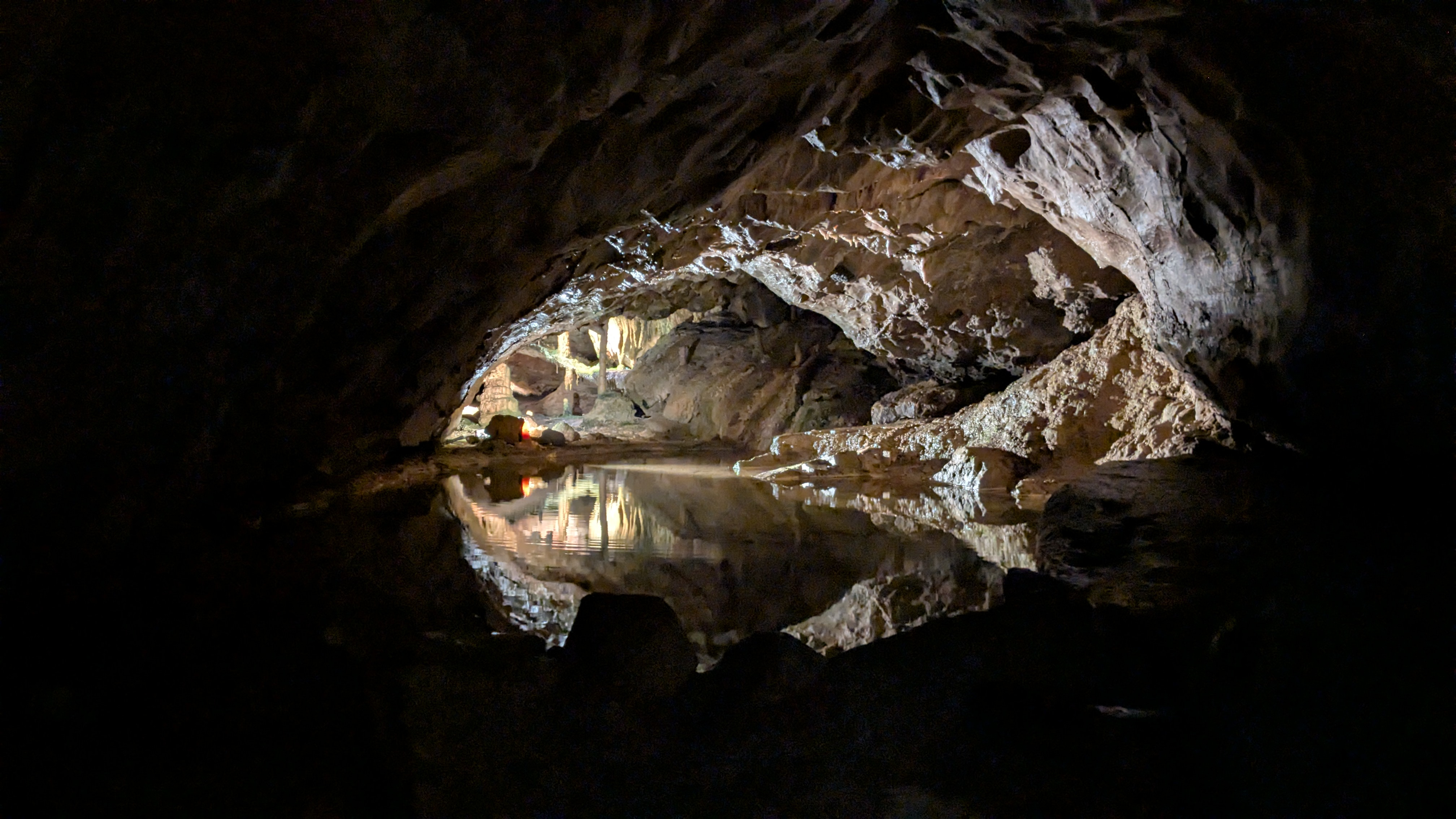
St. Beatus caves

This is a sortable list of caves, grottos and rock shelters in Switzerland. Many are accessible, including some show caves.

| Name | Location | Canton | Notes |
|---|---|---|---|
| Col des Roches Caves | Le Locle | Neuchâtel | Show cave with subterranean watermills at Col des Roches, close to the France–Switzerland border |
| Grotte aux Fées | Saint-Maurice | Valais | Show cave, contains an underground waterfall |
| Grotte de Cotencher | Rochefort | Neuchâtel | Contained Neanderthal skeletal remains, artifacts |
| Grotte du Bichon | La Chaux-de-Fonds | Neuchâtel | Contained Cro-Magnon skeletal remains |
| Höllgrotten | Baar | Zug | Grotto at Lorzentobel (ravine of the river Lorze), a show cave |
| Hölloch | Muotathal | Schwyz | Show cave, second longest cave in Europe |
| Kesslerloch | Thayngen | Schaffhausen | Contained Paleolithic artifacts |
| Kristallhöhle Kobelwald | Oberriet | St. Gallen | Show cave |
| Lamberta Caves | Môtier | Fribourg | 200 metres [660 ft] long tunnel built during World War I |
| Réclère Grottos | Réclère | Jura | Accessible grotto, part of the Prehisto-Park, with life-sized dinosaur figures |
| Saint Beatus Caves | Beatenberg | Bern | Show cave, named after Irish/Scottish-born monk and hermit Beatus of Lungern |
| Saint-Léonard underground lake | Saint-Léonard | Valais | Show cave, contains Europe's largest subterranean lake |
| Schweizersbild | Schaffhausen | Schaffhausen | Rock shelter, contained paleolithic art and skeletal remains |
| Siebenhengste-Hohgant-Höhle | Eriz, Beatenberg, Habkern | Bern | Not accessible to the public |
| Wildenmannlisloch | Wildhaus-Alt St. Johann | St. Gallen | Accessible, contained prehistoric remains |
| Wildkirchli | Schwende-Rüte | Appenzell Innerrhoden | Accessible, located at Ebenalp. Contained prehistoric remains |

== See also ==
- Geography of Switzerland
- List of caves
