= Siebenhengste-Hohgant-Höhle =

World's 13th longest cave (164.5 km) located in Switzerland

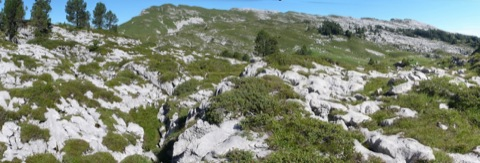
- Lapiaz (eroded calcareous rock) still partially covered by vegetation on the Sieben Hengste massif.

- Location within Switzerland
- Location: Canton of Bern
- Coordinates: 46.7838235°N 7.9012299°E
- Depth: 1,340 m (4,400 ft)
- Length: 164.5 km (102.2 mi)
- Discovery: 1966
- Geology: Limestone
- Entrances: 42

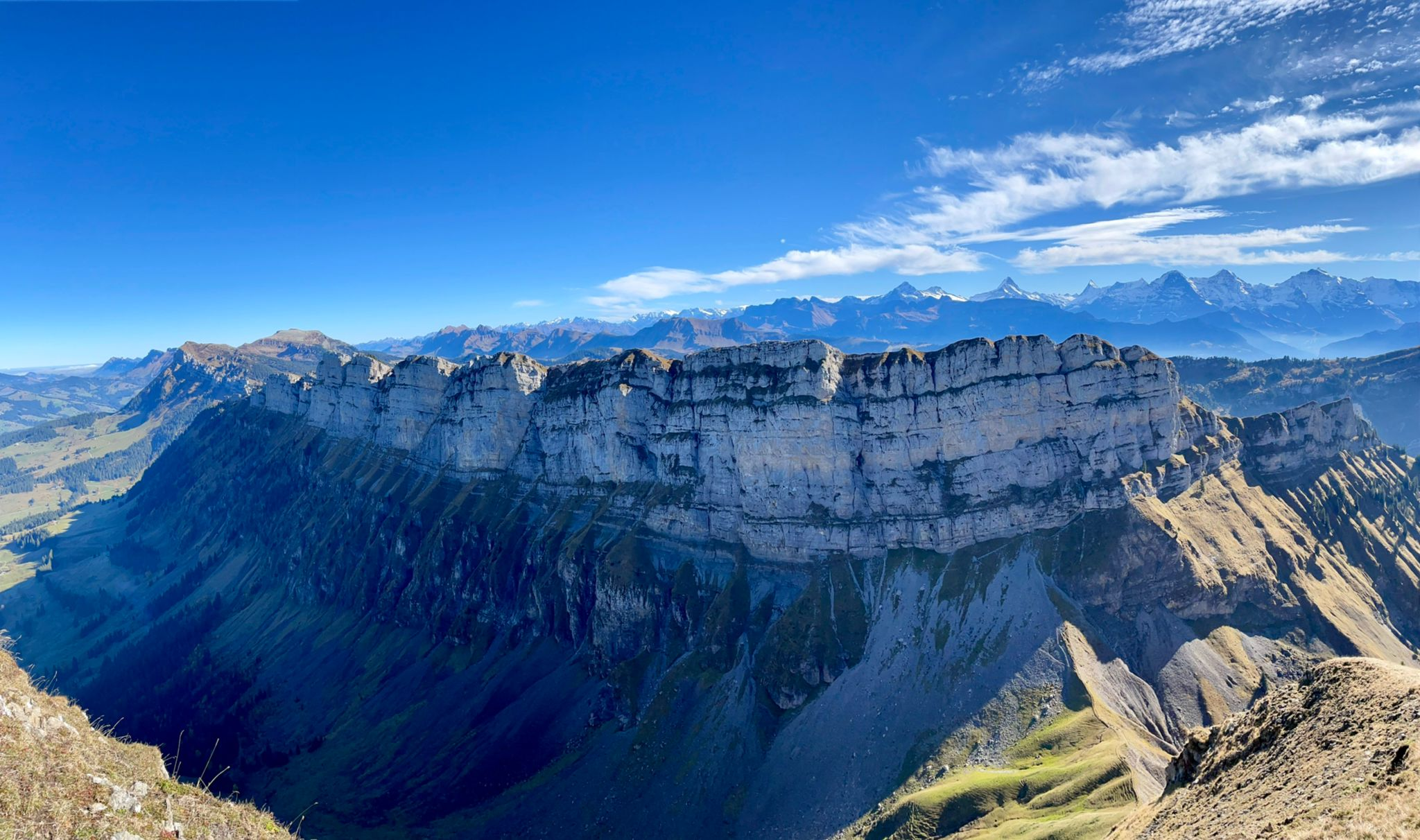
View of the Sieben Hengste from the Sigriswilergrat

Siebenhengste-Hohgant-Höhle is a cave located in Switzerland, near Interlaken in the Canton of Bern north of Lake Thun, between the villages of Eriz and Habkern. The cave network formed in the Schrattenkalk Formation (Aptian age).

The cave was first explored in 1966 by the Club Jurassien, a speleology club from La Chaux-de-Fonds in the canton of Neuchâtel, Switzerland, under the leadership of Jean-Jacques Miserez, a hydrogeochemist who had the intuition that a cave network might be located in the limestone formation of Siebenhengste. In its early explorations, the Club Jurassien discovered the first three of its 42 entrances. Explorations were later undertaken by many different regional caving clubs: G.S Lausanne, S.S Wallonie, Centre Routier Spéléo de Bruxelles, S.C des Montagnes de Neuchâtel, S.S.S Lausanne, S.G.H. Bern, S.G.H Interlaken, S.G.H. Basel, G.I.P.S, until 1979 when the HRH (Association of Speleologists of the Hohgant Region) was created, which brought together all the people working on the network.

Cavers are looking for, among other things, a link to the "Bärenschacht" well located below. If successful, the cave system would expand by more than 84 km in one fell swoop, making it the longest cave in Switzerland in front of the cave Hölloch.

In 2023, it was the world's 13th longest cave, with a 164.5 km development. It is also the world's 26th deepest cave at 1,340 m deep.

== See also ==
- Hohgant (F1 and K2 caves)
- Sieben Hengste
- List of caves in Switzerland
- List of longest caves
- List of deepest caves

== Bibliography ==
- Häuselmann, Philipp (2018). "Le réseau Siebenhengste - Hohgant (Suisse)". Karstologia (in French). 71: 33–44.
- Häuselmann, Philipp (2002). Cave Genesis and Surface Processes in Siebenhengste (in English, German, and French).
- Courbon, P.; Chabert C.; Bosted P.; Lindsley K. (1989). Atlas of the great caves of the world. Cave Books: St. Louis, Missouri.
- Miserez, J.-J. (1966–1973). Explorations du Club Jurassien aux Sieben Hengste. Dédales, Cavernes, Le Rameau de Sapin, La Chaux-de-Fonds, Switzerland.
