= Michel Egloff =

Swiss prehistorian (1941–2021)

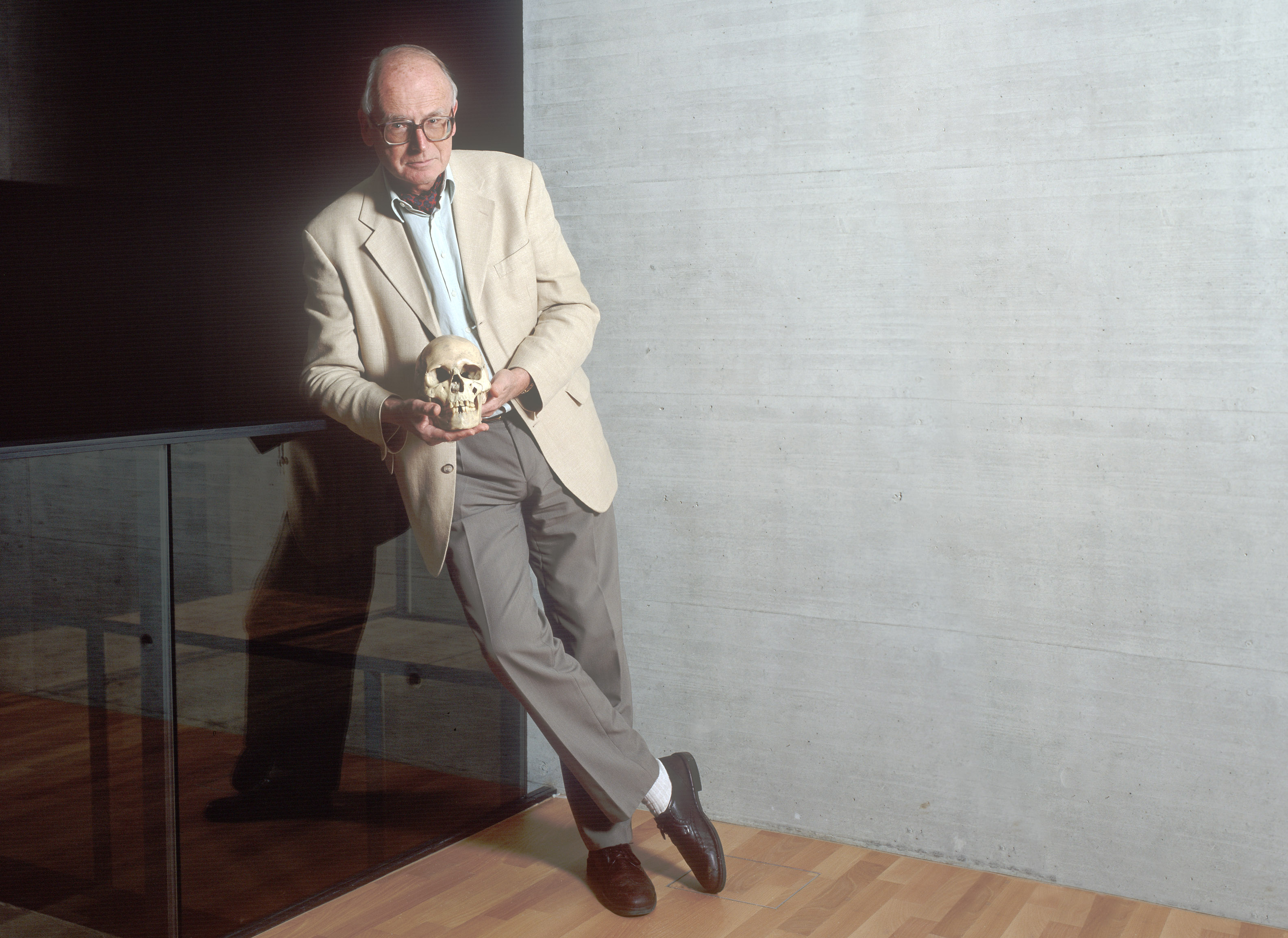
- Born: 29 January 1941
- Died: 29 July 2021 (aged 80)
- Occupation: Prehistorian

Michel Egloff (29 January 1941 – 29 July 2021) was a Swiss prehistorian. He founded the Musée d'archéologie de Neuchâtel, which houses the archeological service of the Canton of Neuchâtel. He was chair of prehistoric archeology at the University of Neuchâtel, where he retired from in 2006 and became an honorary professor. He also founded the archeology museum Laténium in Hauterive.

== Biography ==
Egloff was born to parents who were teachers in Vevey. He studied literature at the University of Lausanne and subsequently worked as an archeologist for the Canton of Vaud. He carried out his first excavations in Avenches, followed by six months of leave in order to graduate from university. As a student, he was a professors' assistant and helped discovery vestiges of ceramic industry in Avenches. His doctoral thesis was supervised by Professor André Leroi-Gourhan, participated in the excavation of the Grotte du Lion. He assisted André Glory in the discovery of cave paintings in Lascaux. He became passionate with the mix of mythology and religion in prehistoric works.

Egloff helped discover a rock shelter near Baulmes in 1966. Shortly thereafter, he defended his thesis at the Sorbonne under Professor Leroi-Gourhan. After his education, he became a history teacher in Yverdon-les-Bains and was curator of the Musée d'Yverdon. In April 1969, he became a professor at the University of Neuchâtel. He soon undertook multiple responsibilities, working as a professor, curator of the Musée d'archéologie de Neuchâtel, and an archeologist for the Canton of Vaud. In 1986, he was elected President of the Swiss-Liechtenstein Foundation for Archaeological Research Abroad, a position he held for 12 years. He carried out several research missions alongside some of his former students.

In 1999, Egloff received the Prix de l'Institut neuchatélois. He retired from the University of Neuchâtel in 2006 and was named an honorary professor afterwards. That year, he was also named Officer of the Ordre des Palmes académiques. In 2018, he received the Médaille de la médiation archéologique de l'Union internationale des sciences préhistoriques et protohistoriques.

Egloff died on 29 July 2021 at the age of 80.

== Publications ==
- Kellia : la poterie copte : quatre siècles d'artisanat et d'échanges en Basse-Egypte (1977)
- Des premiers chasseurs au début du christianisme (1989)
- Laténium pour l'archéologie : le nouveau Parc et Musée d’archéologie de Neuchâtel (2001)
- Laténium - Guide de visite (2010)
