= Col du Mollendruz =

Mountain pass in Switzerland

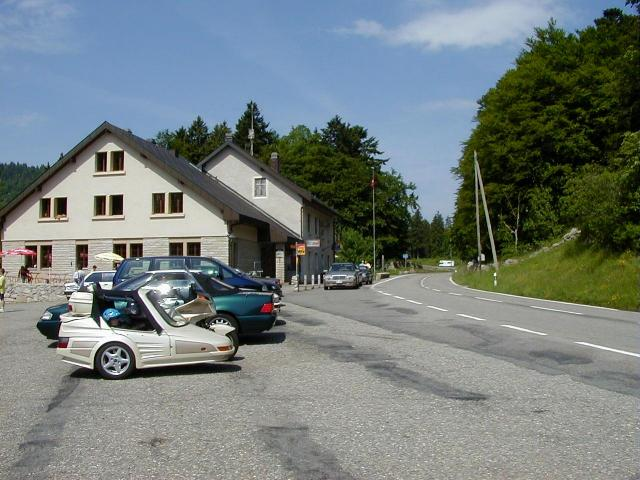
- Col du Mollendruz

- Location within Alps
- Elevation: 1,180 m (3,870 ft)
- Traversed by: Road

Third Approach
- Location: Switzerland
- Range: Jura Mountains
- Coordinates: 46°39′1.85″N 06°21′52.43″E

Col du Mollendruz (el. 1180 m.) is a high mountain pass in the Jura Mountains in the canton of Vaud in Switzerland.

It connects L'Isle and Les Charbonnières.

== See also ==
- List of highest paved roads in Europe
- List of mountain passes
- List of the highest Swiss passes
