= Barony of Prangins =

Lordship in the Canton of Vaud

The Barony of Prangins (French: baronnie de Prangins), originally the Lordship of Prangins, was a lordship in Vaud centred on Prangins Castle in Prangins, on the northern shore of Lake Geneva. First attested in the 12th century, it belonged to the lords of Cossonay-Prangins, was conquered by the House of Savoy at the end of the 13th century and, after several changes of ownership, was bought in 1723 by the banker Louis Guiguer, whose family held it until the end of the ancien régime.

== History ==
=== The lords of Prangins ===
Prangins Castle is mentioned from 1154 and belonged to the lords of Cossonay, a family of the Vaudois high nobility who sometimes took its name. After the death of Jean de Cossonay, around 1230, the family split into several branches, and the younger son Guillaume began to style himself lord of Prangins. In the 13th century the de Prangins also held the town of Nyon, the castles of Mont-le-Vieux and Bioley, and the lordships of Grandcour and Bellerive in the Vully region, which were pledged in 1276 to Count Philip I of Savoy. They regarded their possessions as allodial, with the exception of Nyon, which they declared they held in fief from the archbishop of Besançon.

=== The Savoyard conquest ===
The de Prangins opposed Savoyard expansion north of the lake more resolutely than their cousins of the senior branch. Aymon, who succeeded his brother Jean around 1284, sided with Beatrice, daughter of Peter II of Savoy, in the succession war against Amadeus V and Louis I of Vaud. In 1293–1294 the Savoyards besieged Nyon and seized the family's castles. The House of Savoy obtained the rights of lordship over Prangins in 1297; Aymon formally renounced his claims only in 1306, in exchange for a life annuity. Having lost every tie to the lordship, the family fragmented into cadet and illegitimate branches, from which came two bishops of Lausanne, Guy and Jean de Prangins.

=== From the Savoyard period to 1723 ===
Under Savoy and then under Bern, the lordship passed to a series of holders, among them the de Compois family, Georges de Rive and the Diesbach. Georges de Diesbach (c. 1535 – 1582), from Fribourg, a colonel in French service and governor of Neuchâtel, bore the title of baron of Grandcour and Prangins.

With the Bernese conquest of the Pays de Vaud in 1536, the barony was annexed to the bailiwick of Nyon. The community of Prangins was administered by a Council of Ten. In 1657 the lordship was bought by Friedrich von Dohna, governor of the Principality of Orange and, from that year, a citizen of Bern, who sold it again in 1660.

=== The Guiguer family ===
On 4 September 1723 the barony was bought by Louis Guiguer (1675–1747), a financier from a Huguenot family originally from Bürglen and a former partner in the Paris bank Tourton & Guiguer, who purchased it from Jean Rieux. The deed granted him, together with a large estate with buildings and farmland, the title of baron, which carried rights such as the collection of taxes and dues and certain judicial prerogatives. Guiguer had a new castle built in place of the old one, with works in 1732 and again in 1738 and 1739. In 1743 he commissioned the commissary Abraham Le Coultre to renew the terriers: seigneurial rights and dues were inventoried, fiefs were unified and plans of the barony were drawn up.

Having no children, Louis Guiguer left the barony to his nephew Jean-Georges, who settled in Prangins in the 1750s and hosted Voltaire there in 1754–1755. At his death, on 4 February 1770, his will valued the barony at 300,000 French livres. He was succeeded by his son Louis-François (1741–1786), who took up residence in the castle on 31 March 1771. For about fifteen years Louis-François kept a Journal of over a thousand pages on the daily life of the barony, which his wife Matilda Cleveland continued until her husband's death on 18 December 1786.

=== End of the barony ===
The seigneurial regime ended with the Vaudois revolution of 1798, followed by the redemption of feudal rights. The last holder was Charles-Jules Guiguer de Prangins (1780–1840), son of Louis-François, who in 1798 enlisted in the Vaudois troops against Bern and later became a general in the federal army. In 1814 he sold the property to Joseph Bonaparte, brother of Napoleon.

== Territory and rights ==
From the 11th century Prangins was the seat of a lordship that extended from the Côte to the Pays de Gex; by the time of the Bernese conquest in 1536 the barony comprised only Prangins, Gland and Vich. In the 18th century it also included two thirds of the land rights of Genolier, fishing rights on the Promenthouse and on the lake between Versoix and Rolle, and a monopoly on the use of watercourses; the baron's personal landholding was about 153 hectares. At the end of the 18th century it was one of the three largest lordships of the Pays de Vaud.

The castle was the seat of the lord's judicial and administrative functions and housed a courtroom and a prison; the baron also held the patronage of the churches of Prangins and Vich. The lord of Prangins was answerable to the bailiff of Nyon, a Bernese magistrate.

== Legacy ==
Prangins Castle is now the French-speaking Swiss seat of the Swiss National Museum, inaugurated in 1998. A historical trail of about 12 kilometres, Sur les terres du Baron Guiguer, created by the municipality of Gland together with the museum and the municipality of Prangins, links the castle to La Lignière, the baron's former steward's house, crossing the territory of Gland.

== Bibliography ==
- Rapp, Georges (1942). La seigneurie de Prangins du XIIIe siècle à la chute de l'ancien régime. Étude d'histoire économique et sociale. Bibliothèque historique vaudoise (in French). Vol. 4. Lausanne.
- Guiguer, Louis-François (2007–2009). Viani, Rinantonio (ed.). Journal 1771–1786 (in French). 3 volumes. Prangins: Association des Amis du Château de Prangins.
- Bieri Thomson, Helen (2015). Le château de Prangins. Guides d'art et d'histoire de la Suisse (in French). Bern: Société d'histoire de l'art en Suisse.
- de Schoulepnikoff, Chantal (1991). Le château de Prangins (in French).
- Christe, François; Grand, Colette (1997). Prangins. De la forteresse au château de plaisance. Cahiers d'archéologie romande (in French). Vol. 71.
- Michon, Solange (1994). "Louis Guiguer et le château de Prangins". Genava (in French). 42: 151–180.
- Martignier, David; de Crousaz, Aymon (1867). Dictionnaire historique, géographique et statistique du canton de Vaud (in French). Lausanne: Corbaz. pp. 759–762.

== See also ==
- Prangins Castle
- Prangins
- Louis Guiguer
- Vaud
