= Collection Center of the Swiss National Museum =

National museum depot and workshop in Zürich, Switzerland

Coordinates: 47.2691°N 8.4459°E

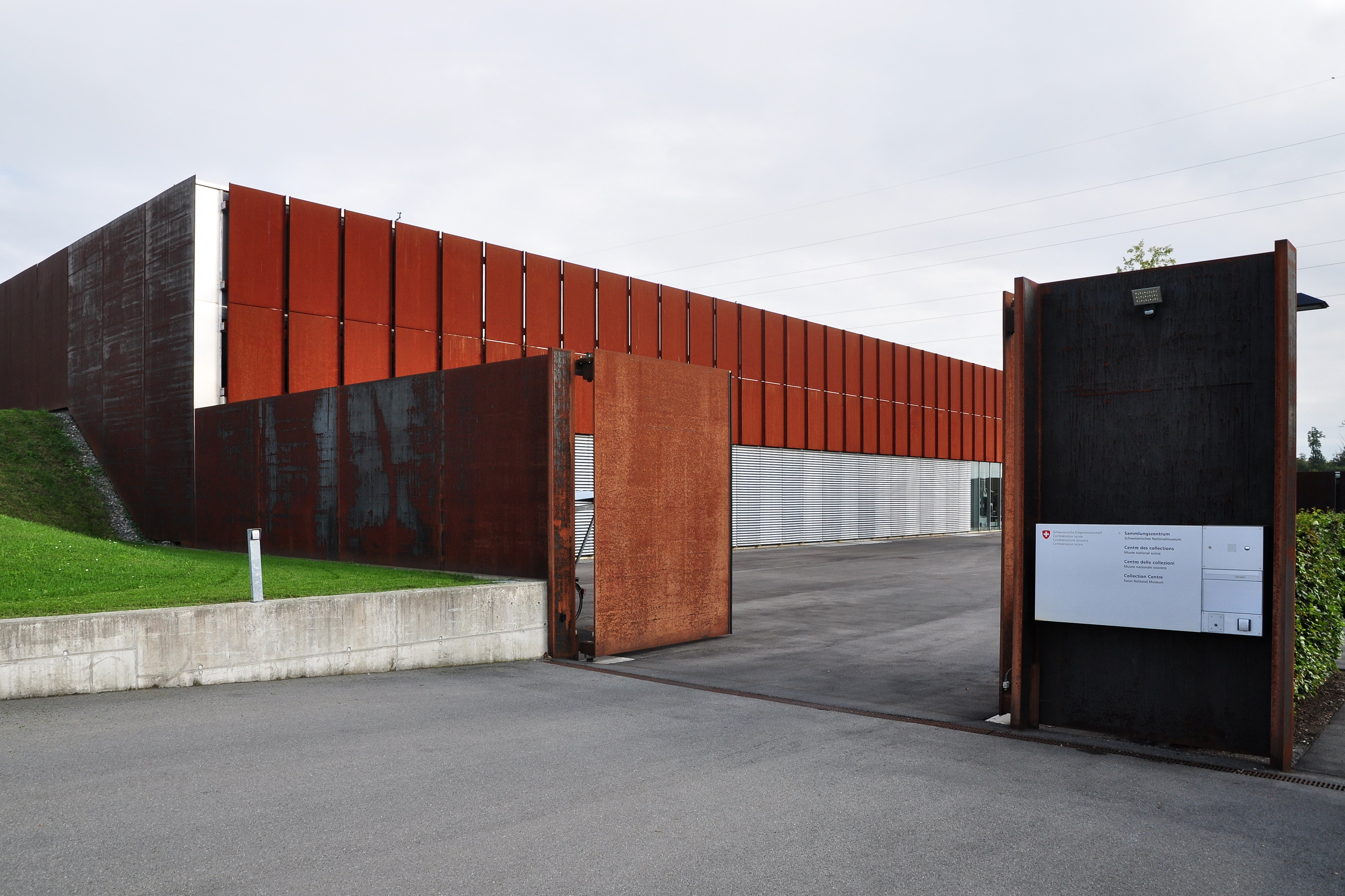
- Entrance to the collection center
- Established: 2007
- Location: Affoltern am Albis, Switzerland
- Type: Museum depot, non-public collection
- Website: www.sammlungszentrum.ch/en

The collection center of the Swiss National Museum is located in Affoltern am Albis, canton of Zurich, and serves as the Swiss National Museum's depot, which also includes the conservators' workshop, handles logistics for packing and shipping cultural objects, and a photographic studio. The center was established by converting an abandoned armory from the 1980s. It is recognized as a national treasure under No. 11777 in the Swiss Inventory of Cultural Objects.

== History ==
The National Museum in Zürich initially served as the exclusive storage location for the museum’s collection. However, the need for more space arose for two reasons. Firstly, fewer objects were being displayed in the exhibition rooms to enhance the educational value of the exhibitions. Secondly, the accumulation of objects over the years required additional storage space. While expansion buildings were considered at the Zürich location, they were not implemented for a long time. As a result, the museum had to move its holdings to external depots. In the 1990s, the National Museum utilized seven external depots at different locations in Zürich. These depots became less suitable for the museum's needs as they became overcrowded, lacked proper cataloging for some holdings, and incurred high rental costs. Additionally, the storage conditions no longer met the standard requirements for preserving cultural objects.

In 1998, an initial collection was relocated to an old armory in Affoltern am Albis, previously owned by the Swiss Army. However, the space quickly proved insufficient for the museum's needs. As the museum sought new premises, an opportunity arose when the Federal Office for Buildings and Logistics discovered the availability of a recently constructed armory, which had opened in 1985 but was no longer required after the end of the Cold War. From 2005 to 2007, the armory was renovated by Stücheli Architects from Zürich to serve its new purpose. The restoration project amounted to 30 million Swiss francs, and the inauguration took place on November 6, 2007, with the participation of Federal Councilor Pascal Couchepin.

Since the establishment of the Swiss National Museum in 2010, the Collection Centre has also served as a depot for Prangins Castle and the Forum of Swiss History Schwyz, which opened in 1995 to complement the Swiss Federal Charter Museum in Schwyz.

== Building ==
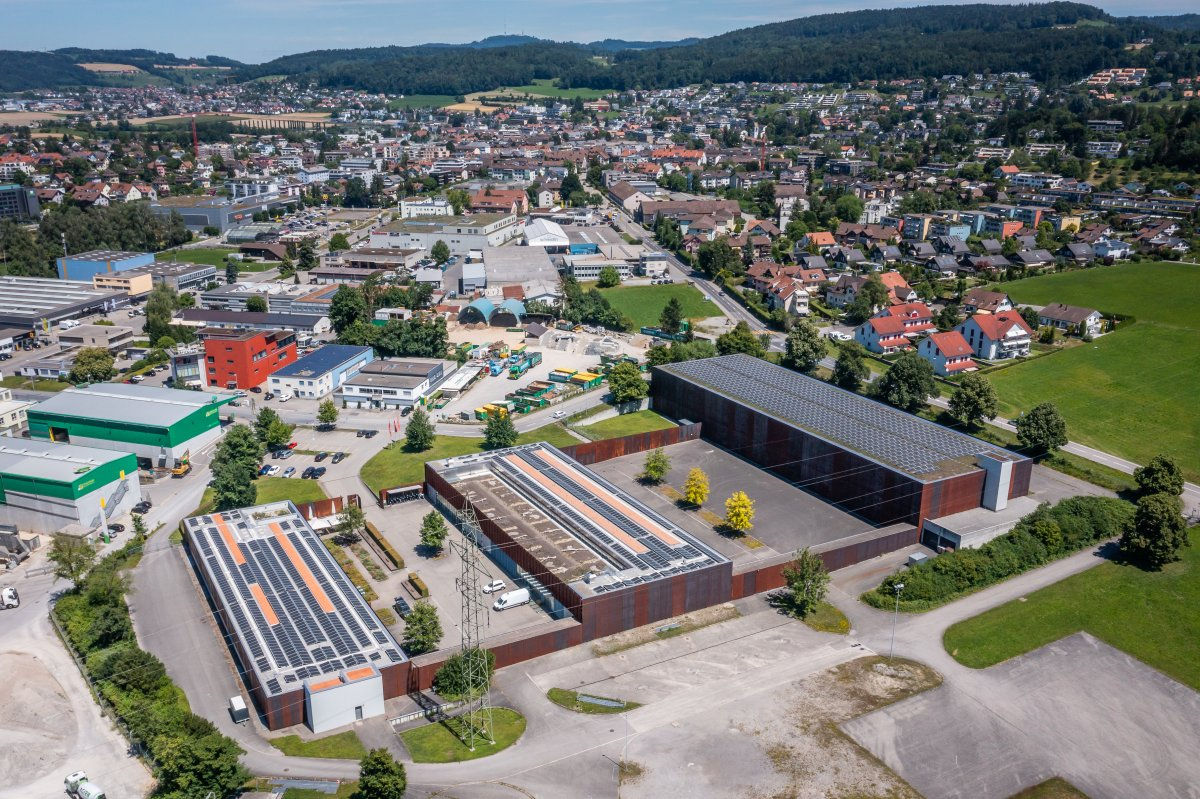
The collection center of the Swiss National Museum seen from a drone (2022)

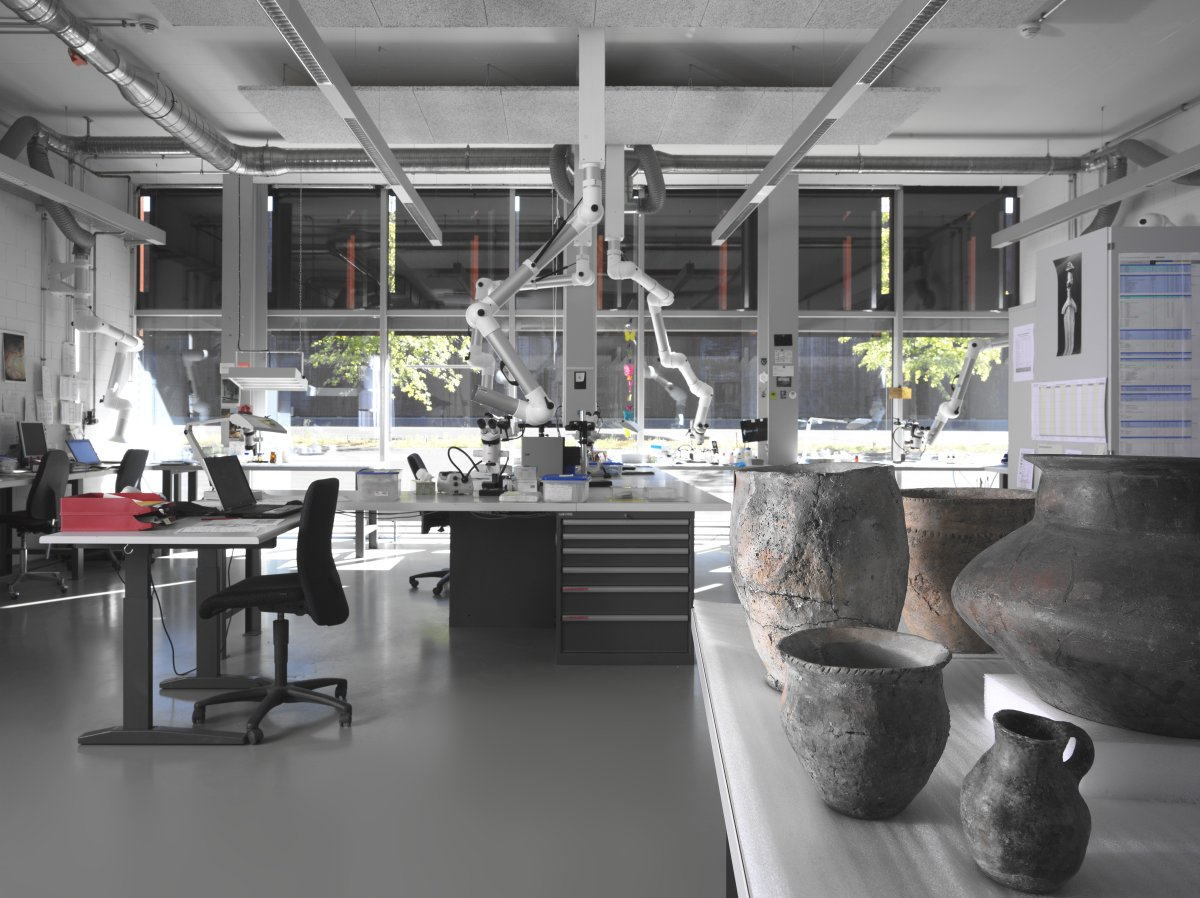
Laboratory

The former arsenal buildings were transformed into a collection center. The center consists of three parallel wings, which are connected by a cross-corridor. There is potential for future expansion, allowing for almost double the current floor space towards the south. The largest building, referred to as building number 1, was originally a three-story vehicle parking garage but has now been transformed into the main depot area, offering approximately 10,000 m2 of space for storing museum objects. Building number 2 accommodates the studios for conservators and restorers, as well as a laboratory dedicated to art object research. Building number 3 serves as the service center, housing the reception area, object registration rooms, a photo studio, and a library.

During the reconstruction, all buildings were adorned with facades made of untreated steel that developed a rust coating over time. The large steel plates are divided horizontally by a joint that encircles the entire building, following the height development along the Swiss border. The collection center's building shell is insulated with a thickness of 30 cm to meet the Minergie-P standard. The facility is heated and cooled using a geothermal probe heat pump.The temperature in the buildings fluctuates between 18 and 22 °C for 90% of the year; good insulation would preserve the temperature between 7 °C in winter and 13 °C in summer even if the heating system failed completely.

== Collections ==
The Collection Center houses approximately 860,000 objects divided into the following 14 collection holdings:

- Archaeology contains soil finds from Switzerland
- Precious and non-ferrous metals, objects from the goldsmith's art
- Graphics, photography, book illumination, and facsimile
- Ceramics and glass
- Carriages, sleighs, and vehicles
- Painting and sculpture
- Furniture and interiors
- Numismatics and seals
- Jewelry and watches
- Special collections, such as collections of toys, musical instruments, or pastry models
- Technology and customs, objects from everyday culture, and industrial working environment
- Textile and fashion
- Weapons and uniforms
- Contemporary witnesses from the time after 1945
