= HBG (time signal) =

Time signal radio station in Switzerland

HBG time code transmitter
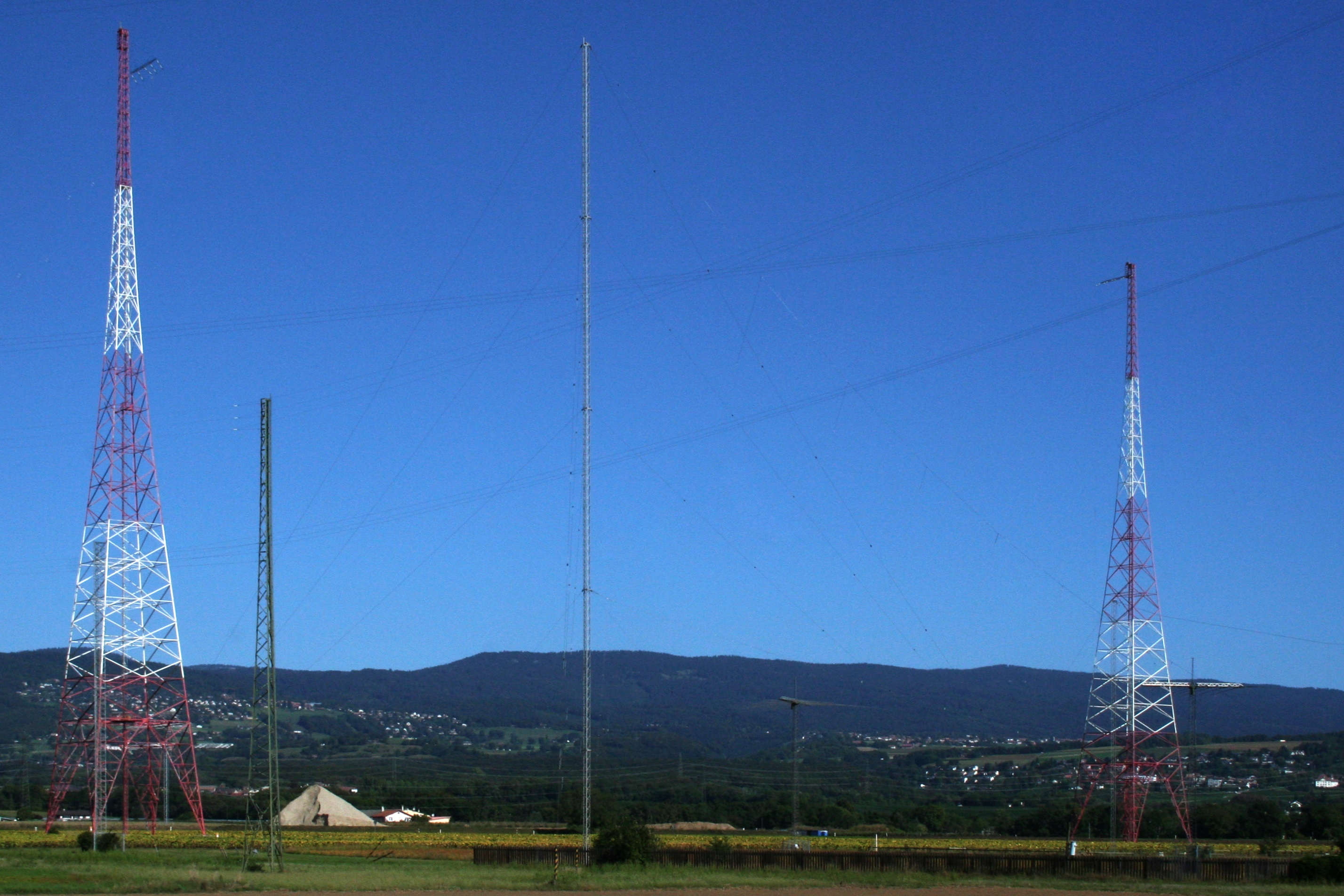
- HBG transmitter in Prangins, Switzerland (now demolished)
- Location: Prangins, Switzerland
- Coordinates: 46.408356°N 6.252769°E
- Operator: Swiss Federal Office of Metrology (METAS)
- Frequency: 75 kHz
- Power: 20 kW
- Began operation: 1966
- Ceased operation: 1 January 2012 07:00:13.2 UTC

HBG was a low frequency time signal transmitter for the Swiss time reference system. It transmitted on 75 kHz with 20 kW power, and was located in Prangins, Switzerland.

Due to the cost of urgently needed renovation for the ageing antennas, and the ease with which all existing users could switch to the DCF77 time signal, the Swiss Federal Government decided to shut down HBG at the end of 2011. HBG transmission ceased on New Year’s Day 2012 at 07:00:13.2 UTC.

On 6 September 2012 at 12:02:00 UTC both antenna towers were demolished by controlled explosives.

The HBG transmission format was very similar to DCF77. At the beginning of each second (with the exception of the 59th), the carrier signal was interrupted for a period of 0.1 s or 0.2 s, which corresponded to a binary "0" or "1". The transmission of the minute, hour, calendar date, day of the week, month and current year was achieved by means of a BCD code identical to that of DCF77.

Like DCF77, the carrier was not interrupted during the last second of each minute.

Differences from the DCF77 time code:

- The carrier frequency.
- Phase modulation was not included.
- Amplitude modulation was done by disabling the transmitter (0% amplitude) rather than reducing it to 15% amplitude as DCF77 does.
- Announcement bits warning of impending time zone changes or leap seconds were sent 12 hours in advance, rather than 1 hour.
- The first pulse of each minute was not a standard 0 bit as DCF77 sends. Instead, it was a double pulse, two 0.1 s interruptions separated by 0.1 s of carrier. A triple pulse signalled the start of a new hour, and a four-pulse signal was transmitted at noon and midnight.

It is understood that this frequency is now available in Europe, as well as any other part of the world, for time signal dissemination.
