= La Côte Airfield =

Private airfield in Switzerland

La Côte Aérodrome La Côte
- IATA: none; ICAO: LSGP

Summary
- Airport type: Private
- Location: Prangins, Switzerland
- Elevation AMSL: 412 m (1,352 ft)
- Coordinates: 46°24′23″N 6°15′29″E
- Website: http://www.lsgp.ch
- Interactive map of La Côte

Runways
Direction	Length		Surface
Direction	ft	m	Surface
04/22		490	Grass
- Source: official website

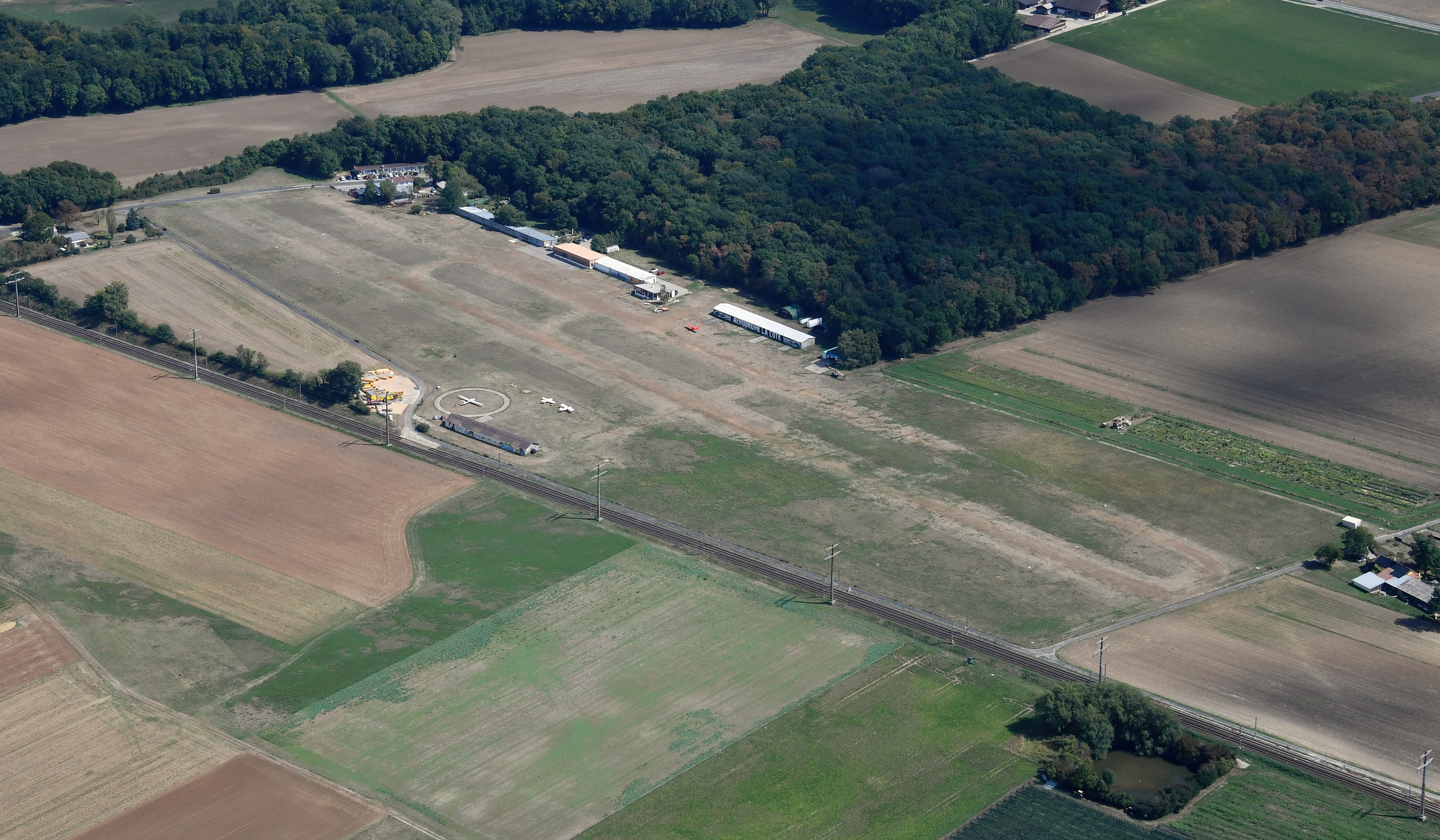
Aerial image of the La Côte airfield

The La Côte Airfield (ICAO code LSGP) is a private airfield in Prangins, Switzerland. It hosted a fly-in in 2009, 2011, 2013, on August 15, 2015 and in 2019.
