= Louis Guiguer =

Swiss-French banker (1675–1747)

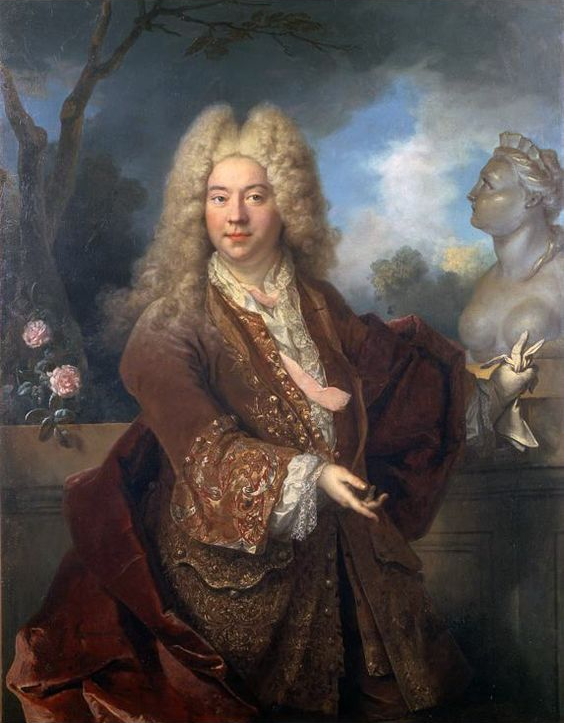
- Born: 9 December 1675; Lyon, France
- Died: 17 December 1747 (aged 72); Paris, France
- Occupations: Merchant, financier
- Known for: Baron of Prangins; partner in the Tourton & Guiguer bank
- Spouse: Judith Van Robais (m. 1713)
- Relatives: Isaac Guiguer (brother); Isaac Thellusson (nephew); Jean-Georges Guiguer (nephew and heir)

Louis Guiguer (9 December 1675 – 17 December 1747) was a Swiss-French Huguenot merchant and financier active in maritime trade and real estate. A partner in the Paris-based Tourton & Guiguer bank, he became baron of Prangins in 1723 and oversaw the reconstruction of the Prangins castle.

== Family background ==
Louis Guiguer was born in Lyon on 9 December 1675, the son of Léonard Guiguer (1632–1710), a textile merchant from a Huguenot family originally from Bürglen in the canton of Thurgau, and of Elisabeth Tourton, from a burgher family of Annonay in Haut-Vivarais allied with the Guiguers since the 17th century. The Guiguer family had been established in Lyon since the arrival of Léonard Guiguer (c. 1593–1643), and together with the Tourtons formed one of the most notable constellations of the "Huguenot international" of Protestant refugees, active in banking and trade between Lyon, Geneva, Paris, London and Amsterdam.

== Banking career ==
After beginning his commercial career in Amsterdam alongside his elder brother Isaac Guiguer, Louis Guiguer settled in Paris, where he is recorded from 1699 in the bank of his cousin, Jean-Claude Tourton. Initially a clerk, he became a partner in 1703. From 1706 the establishment was known as Tourton & Guiguer and operated a branch in London. The bank was among the five largest in Paris and was particularly involved with royal affairs and with various figures at court. In 1715, the two partners transferred the bank to Isaac Thellusson, Guiguer's nephew and the son of his sister Jeanne Guiguer.

== Marriage and investments ==
In 1713, Guiguer married Judith Van Robais, daughter of Josse Van Robais, director of the Royal Manufactory of fine cloth at Abbeville in Picardy. Beyond a dowry of 60,000 livres, the marriage opened new business opportunities, complementing the already extensive network of the Guiguer, Tourton and Thellusson families. Royal manufacturers active in textiles, the Van Robais were also shipowners, connected in particular to the business circles of the port cities of Saint-Malo and Cádiz. Alongside them, Guiguer invested in maritime trade, notably with shipowners in Le Havre and Saint-Malo (in particular the Magon house). The numerous investments of this leading financier are nevertheless difficult to trace, both for lack of sources and because of the nominees he employed. In 1717, Guiguer was the fourth subscriber to the financial system established by John Law (later Controller-General of Finances of the kingdom of France), which included the Mississippi Company. These investments in all likelihood allowed Guiguer to reap considerable profits. He was thus a capitalist inevitably linked to the colonial economy of his time, whose participation in the Atlantic slave trade occurred through shares in Law's system. It is unknown whether Guiguer's investments in maritime trade, in particular through his in-laws the Van Robais, also concerned the slave trade.

== Real estate and barony of Prangins ==
Some beneficiaries of the system, enriched by skillful speculation, managed to repatriate or reinvest their gains in time, before Law's collapse, by acquiring estates and buildings. This was probably also the case for Guiguer, whose final major investment focus was real estate. The first significant acquisition was, in 1717, a large property on the outskirts of Paris. In 1722, he purchased an imposing hôtel particulier in the French capital.

His most celebrated acquisition was finally the barony of Prangins, purchased from Jean Rieux. Signed in 1723, the deed conferred on Guiguer, in addition to a large estate with outbuildings and agricultural land, the title of baron, which beyond its symbolic value carried a series of rights including the collection of taxes and judicial prerogatives. In 1732, and again in 1738 and 1739, Guiguer undertook the reconstruction of the castle of Prangins in place of the one that then stood there. Having remained childless, he bequeathed the barony of Prangins at his death to his nephew Jean-Georges Guiguer, son of his brother George Tobie Guiguer and of Suzanne Leti, daughter of Gregorio Leti.

== Bibliography ==
- Lüthy, Herbert: La banque protestante en France, de la révocation de l'Edit de Nantes à la Révolution, vol. 1, 1959.
- Michon, Solange: "Louis Guiguer et le château de Prangins", in: Genava, 42, 1994, pp. 151–180.

=== Archival sources ===
- Archives d'État de Genève, Geneva, Famille Guiguer.
