= Prangins Castle =

Castle in Prangins, Switzerland

- Château de Prangins
- Prangins in Switzerland
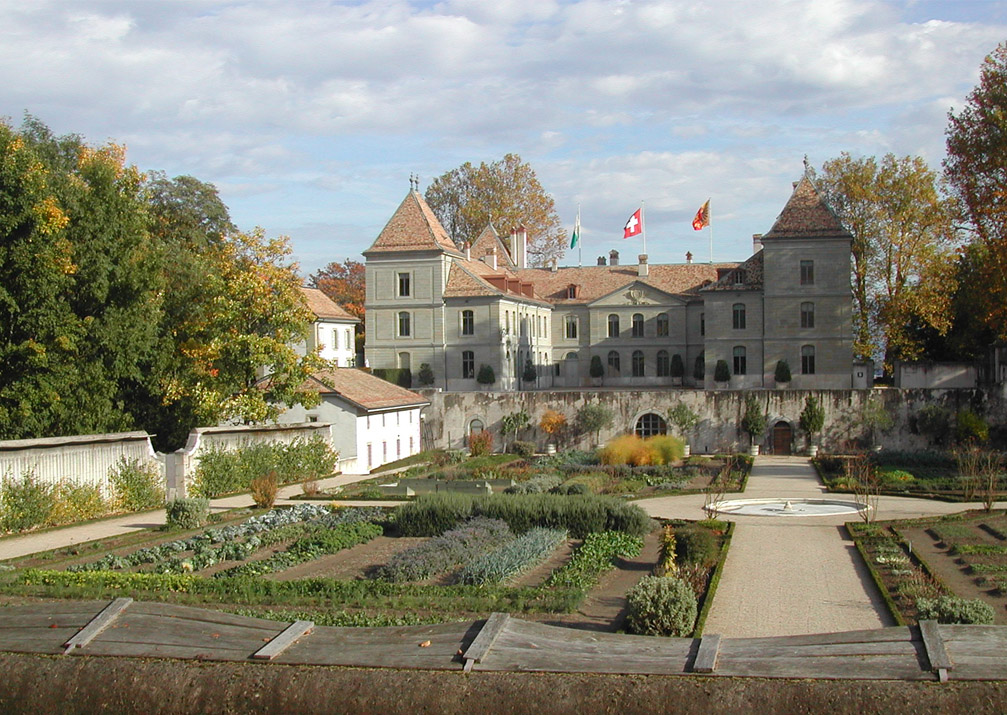
- Prangins Castle with its gardens

Site information
- Owner: Swiss federal government
- Condition: Part of the Swiss National Museum

Location
- Location within Canton of Vaud Location within Switzerland
- Coordinates: 46°23′39″N 6°15′07″E

Swiss Cultural Property of National Significance

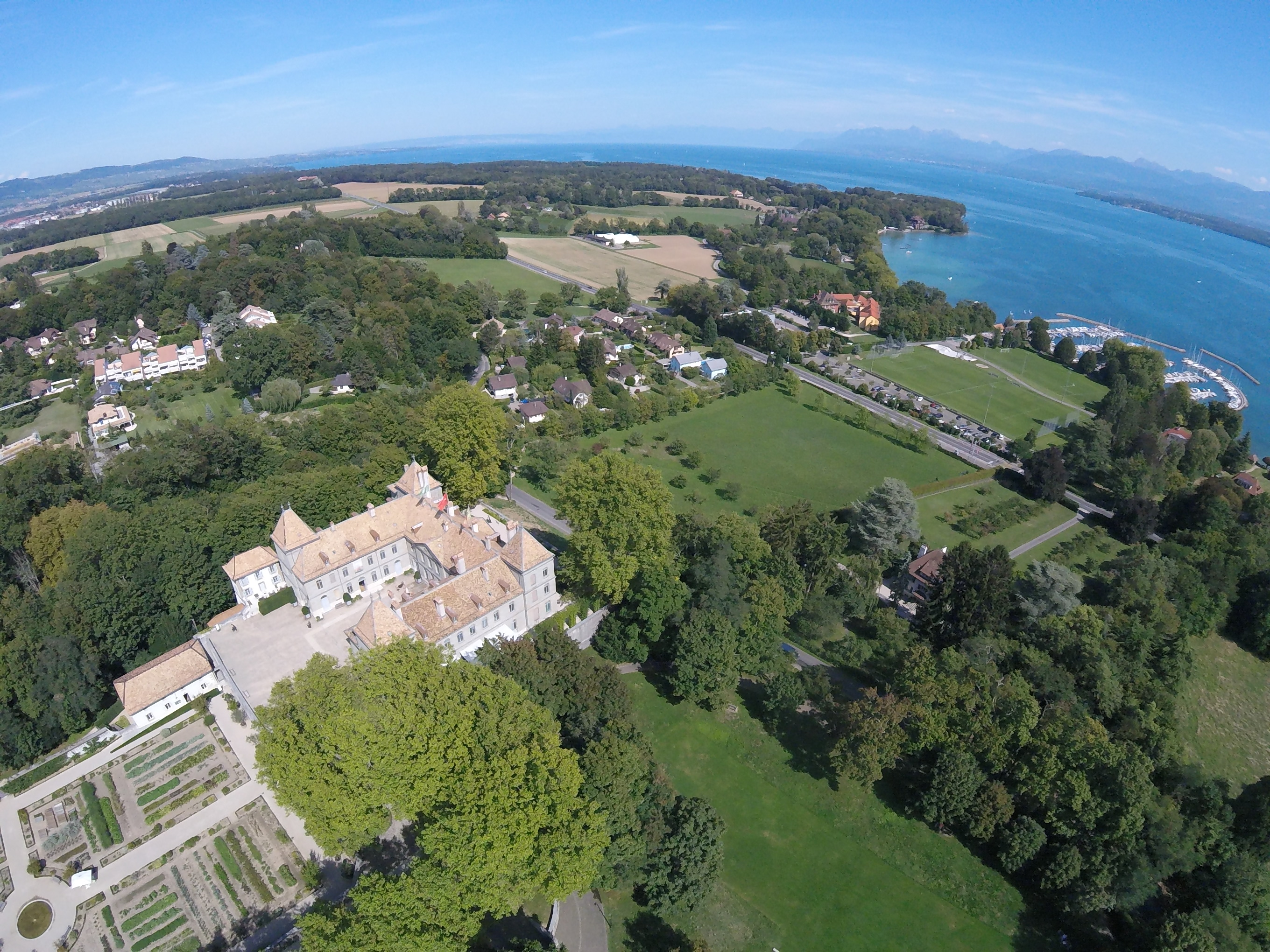
Aerial photo of Prangins Castle

Prangins Castle is a castle in the municipality of Prangins of the Canton of Vaud in Switzerland. It is a Swiss heritage site of national significance.

It is home to one part of the Swiss National Museum. There are other parts are in Zurich and Schwyz. At Prangins, the displays focus mainly on daily life in the castle and the region. There are also displays relating to Swiss history, as well as temporary exhibitions and cultural events. There is a café, serving drinks, snacks and lunch. The terrace has views of Lake Geneva and the Alps.

== History ==
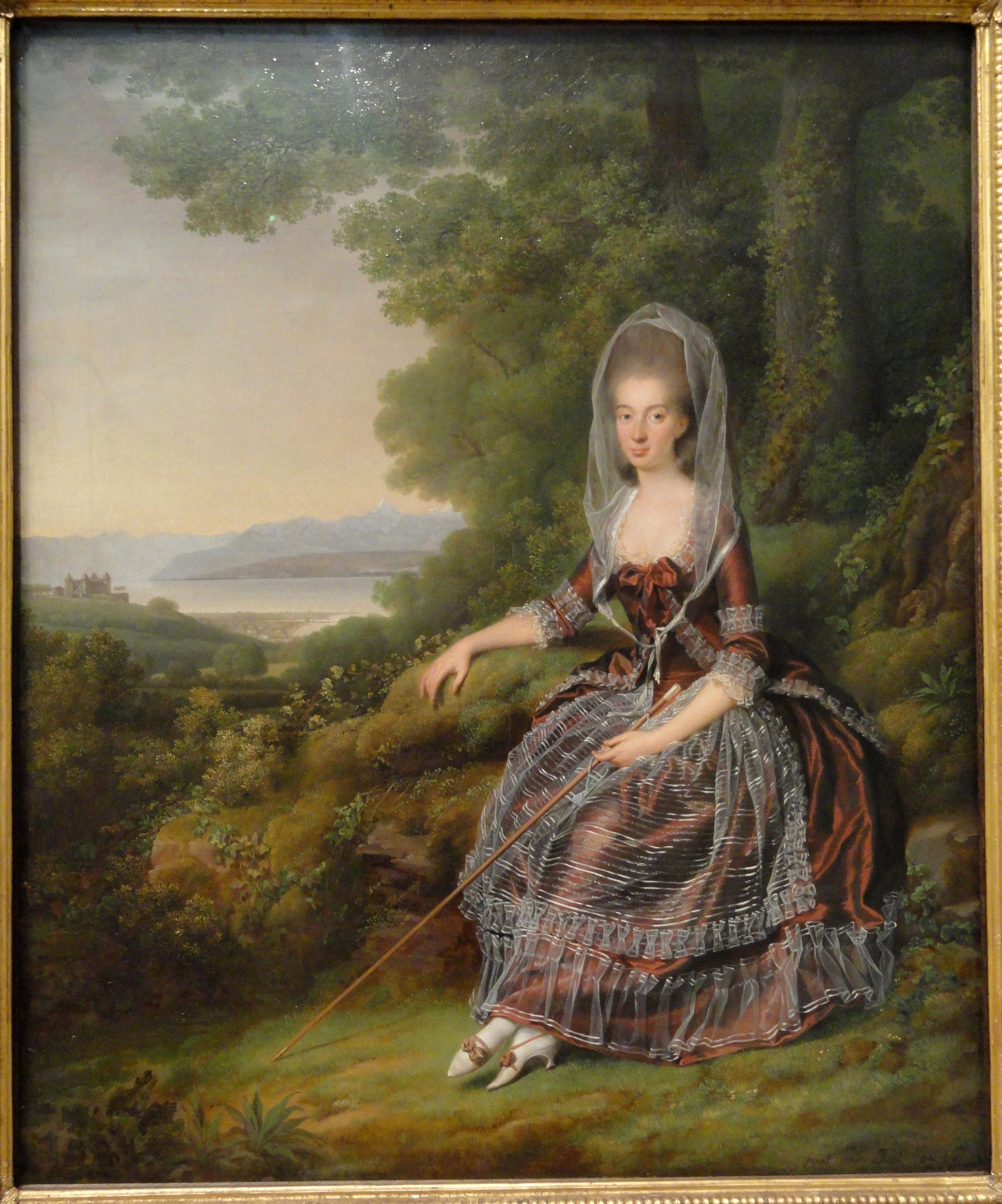
Baroness Matilde Guiguer de Prangins in Her Park at Lake Leman, by Jens Juel, 1779 - Statens Museum for Kunst.

Prangins Castle has been a seat of power for centuries. The first record of the domain is from 1096. The current building dates from 1732, and has been extensively restored and furnished in the original style. The gardens are particularly unusual as they include an extensive sunken kitchen garden which has been replanted to match its original 18th century organisation.

=== Before 1730 ===
An earlier building on the site was destroyed in 1293 by the Dukes of Savoy. It was rebuilt and changed hands repeatedly over the coming centuries. Nicholas de Diesbach enlarged the property in 1613. His family ceded the property to Countess Emilia of Nassau in 1627. The demesne was sold in 1656.

It was sold again in 1719, this time to Jean Rieu, a Genevan citizen and a Paris banker. Four years later, in 1723, he passed it on to another Paris banker, Louis Guiguer. Guiger, who was originally from the canton of St Gallen, built the palace you see today. The building on the site was probably close to a ruin.

=== Voltaire and Napoleon ===
The castle was inherited by Guiger's nephew, Jean-George. He gave Voltaire, who was then exiled from France, the use of the property. In 1755 Jean-George Guiguer came to live at Prangins. He commissioned the temple and improved the gardens. After his death, Prangins passed to his son, Louis-François Guiguer de Prangins. Starting in 1771, Louis-François kept a journal detailing the daily life of the region. Over the following 15 years, he filled 7 volumes. His writings form a key part of the current museum offering.

His son and heir, Charles-Jules, became a general in the Swiss army. In 1814, he sold the castle to Joseph Bonaparte, the elder brother of Napoleon Bonaparte.

From 1873 to 1920, the castle was used as a school by the Frères Moraves, a Protestant monastic order.

=== From home to museum ===
In 1920, Horace de Pourtalès, then working at the League of Nations in Geneva. In 1929, Josephine Dexter bought Prangins for her daughter, Katharine McCormick. In 1962, the castle was passed to the government of the US. It was intended to be the residence of their ambassador to the United Nations. Instead, in 1970, it was sold to Bernard Cornfeld, administrator of IOS (Investment Overseas Services).

At around this time, the Swiss National Museum wanted to transfer part of its collection to a suitable location in the French-speaking region of Switzerland. Prangins Castle seemed ideal. The Swiss federal government balked at the sale price, then CHF 2.5 million. The property was purchased by the cantonal governments of Vaud and Geneva on 19 July 1974. A year later, it was given to the federal government to become a Swiss National Museum. A great deal of renovation work was required, and the museum opened in 1998.

== See also ==
- List of castles in Switzerland
- Château
