= Prangins =

- Municipality
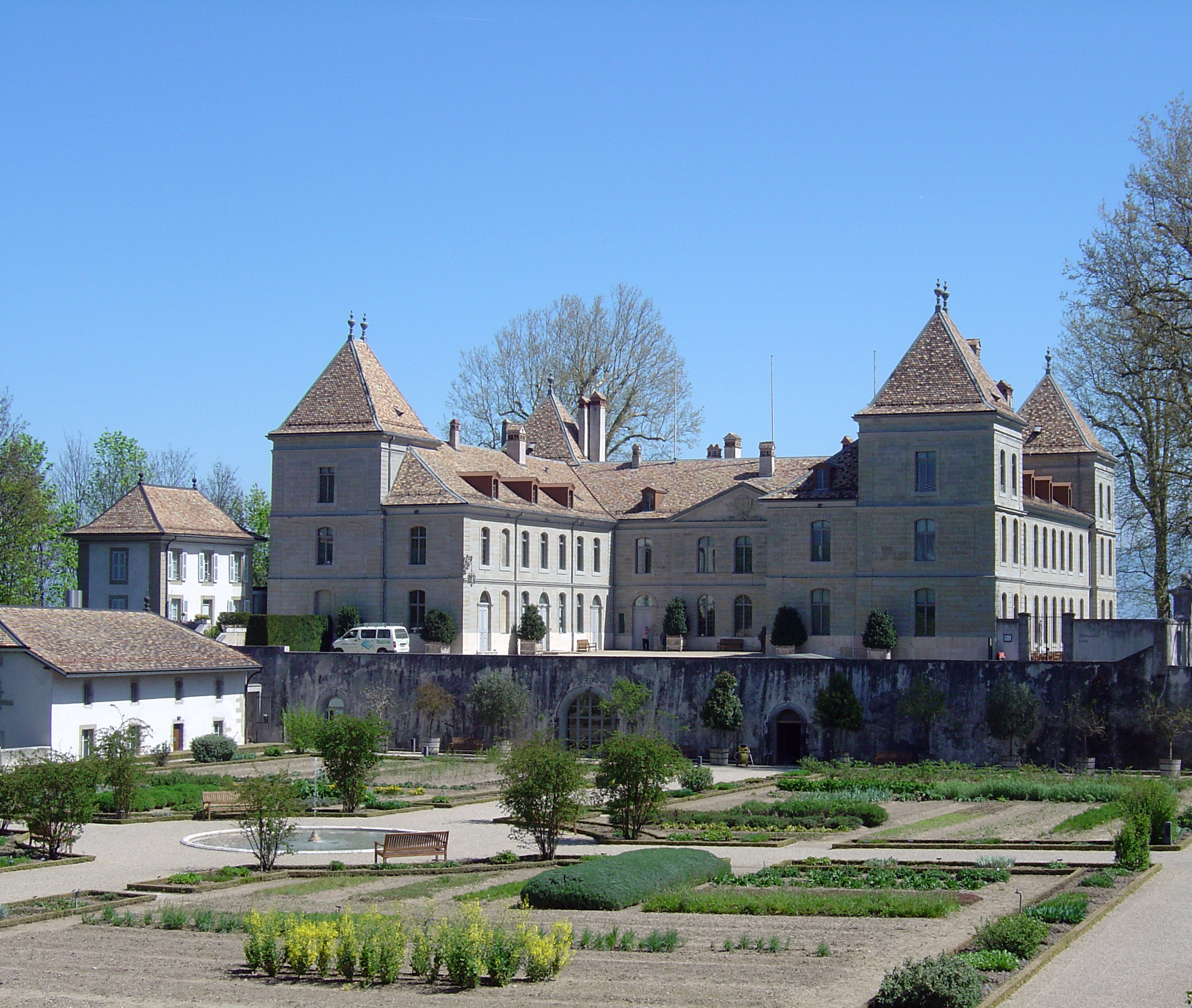
- Castle of Prangins

- Flag Coat of arms
- Location of Prangins
- Location within Switzerland Location within Canton of Vaud
- Coordinates: 46°24′N 06°15′E
- Country: Switzerland
- Canton: Vaud
- District: Nyon

Government
  - Mayor: Syndic; François Briand

Area
  - Total: 6.03 km^{2} (2.33 sq mi)
- Elevation: 413 m (1,355 ft)

Population (2000)
  - Total: 3,133
  - Density: 520/km^{2} (1,350/sq mi)
- Time zone: UTC+01:00 (CET)
  - Summer (DST): UTC+02:00 (CEST)
- Postal code: 1197
- SFOS number: 5725
- ISO 3166 code: CH-VD
- Surrounded by: Nyon, Duillier, Coinsins, Vich, Gland
- Website: www.Prangins.ch

Prangins (French pronunciation: [pʁɑ̃ʒɛ̃]) is a municipality in the district of Nyon in the canton of Vaud in Switzerland. It is located on Lake Geneva.

== History ==
Aerial view (1964)

Prangins is first mentioned around 1135-85 as Prengins. Following the fall of the Second French Empire, Prince Napoléon Bonaparte and his wife, Princess Maria Clotilde of Savoy, resided in exile at Château de Prangins, where Charles I of Austria and his family would later take residence briefly, beginning 20 May 1919.

== Geography ==
Prangins has an area, as of 2009, of 6 square kilometers (2.3 mi^{2}). Of this area, 3.3 km^{2} (1.3 mi^{2}) or 54.7% is used for agricultural purposes, while 0.79 km^{2} (0.31 mi^{2}) or 13.1% is forested. Of the rest of the land, 1.89 km^{2} (0.73 mi^{2}) or 31.3% is settled (buildings or roads), 0.04 km^{2} (9.9 acres) or 0.7% is either rivers or lakes and 0.01 km^{2} (2.5 acres) or 0.2% is unproductive land.

Of the built up area, industrial buildings made up 1.5% of the total area while housing and buildings made up 18.2% and transportation infrastructure made up 7.6%. while parks, green belts and sports fields made up 3.5%. Out of the forested land, 10.9% of the total land area is heavily forested and 2.2% is covered with orchards or small clusters of trees. Of the agricultural land, 42.6% is used for growing crops and 5.1% is pastures, while 7.0% is used for orchards or vine crops. Of the water in the municipality, 0.5% is in lakes and 0.2% is in rivers and streams.

The municipality was part of the Nyon District until it was dissolved on 31 August 2006, and Prangins became part of the new district of Nyon.

The municipality is located on a terrace on the north shore of the Petit-Lac portion of Lake Geneva. It consists of the village of Prangins and the hamlets of Bénex and Promenthoux.

== Coat of arms ==
The blazon of the municipal coat of arms is Azure, a Tower roofed Argent, in base three Hands of the same shaking issuant from dexter, sinister and base.

== Demographics ==
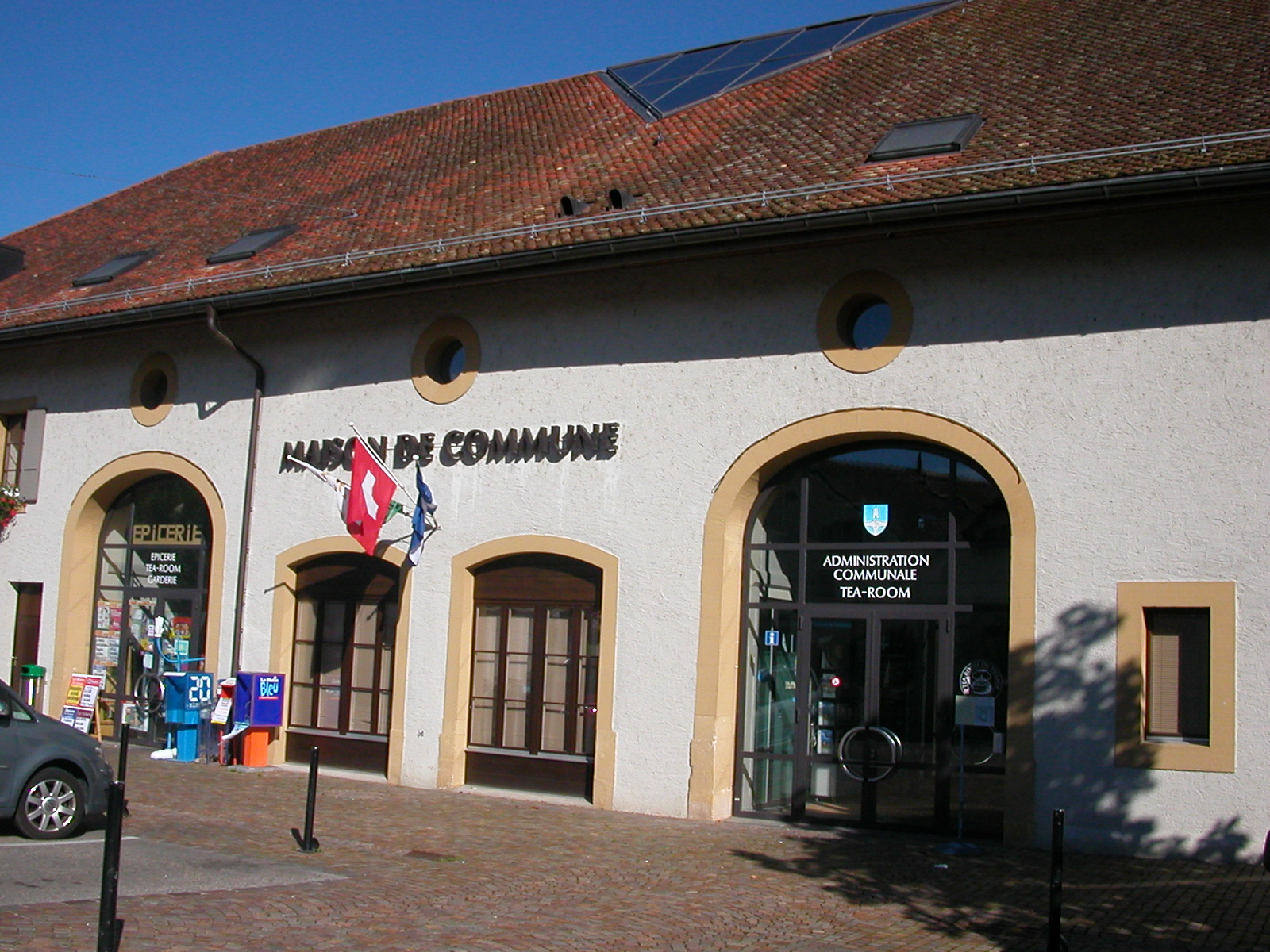
Prangins town hall

Prangins has a population (as of December 2020) of 4,099. As of 2008, 26.7% of the population are resident foreign nationals. Over the last 10 years (1999–2009 ) the population has changed at a rate of 28.6%. It has changed at a rate of 19.7% due to migration and at a rate of 8.9% due to births and deaths.

Most of the population (as of 2000) speaks French (2,439 or 77.8%), with German being second most common (248 or 7.9%) and English being third (185 or 5.9%). There are 65 people who speak Italian and 4 people who speak Romansh.

The age distribution, as of 2009, in Prangins is; 511 children or 13.4% of the population are between 0 and 9 years old and 515 teenagers or 13.5% are between 10 and 19. Of the adult population, 371 people or 9.7% of the population are between 20 and 29 years old. 529 people or 13.8% are between 30 and 39, 672 people or 17.6% are between 40 and 49, and 506 people or 13.2% are between 50 and 59. The senior population distribution is 423 people or 11.1% of the population are between 60 and 69 years old, 210 people or 5.5% are between 70 and 79, there are 78 people or 2.0% who are between 80 and 89, and there are 10 people or 0.3% who are 90 and older.

As of 2000, there were 1,300 people who were single and never married in the municipality. There were 1,589 married individuals, 85 widows or widowers and 159 individuals who are divorced.

As of 2000, there were 1,259 private households in the municipality, and an average of 2.4 persons per household. There were 352 households that consist of only one person and 77 households with five or more people. Out of a total of 1,280 households that answered this question, 27.5% were households made up of just one person and there were 2 adults who lived with their parents. Of the rest of the households, there are 364 married couples without children, 449 married couples with children There were 76 single parents with a child or children. There were 16 households that were made up of unrelated people and 21 households that were made up of some sort of institution or another collective housing.

In 2000 there were 470 single family homes (or 69.7% of the total) out of a total of 674 inhabited buildings. There were 144 multi-family buildings (21.4%), along with 43 multi-purpose buildings that were mostly used for housing (6.4%) and 17 other use buildings (commercial or industrial) that also had some housing (2.5%).

In 2000, a total of 1,184 apartments (86.0% of the total) were permanently occupied, while 180 apartments (13.1%) were seasonally occupied and 12 apartments (0.9%) were empty. As of 2009, the construction rate of new housing units was 2 new units per 1000 residents. The vacancy rate for the municipality, in 2010, was 0%.

The historical population is given in the following chart:

== Heritage sites of national significance ==
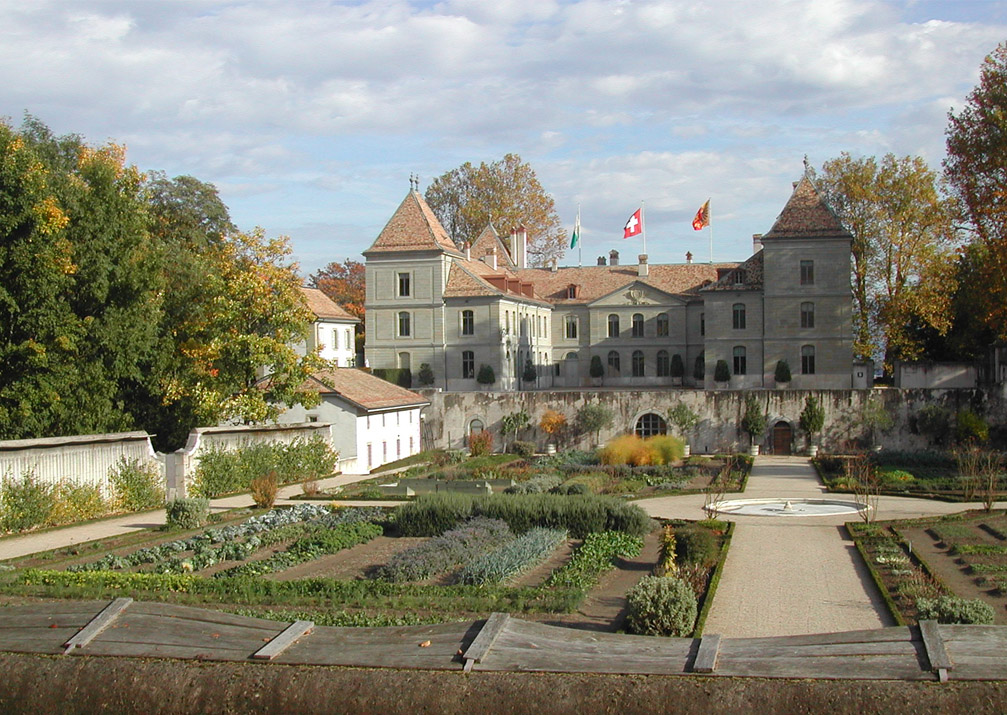
Prangins Castle

Prangins Castle with the National Museum and the Villa Les Bleuets are listed as Swiss heritage site of national significance. The entire village of Prangins is part of the Inventory of Swiss Heritage Sites.

== Sights ==
The HBG facility for time signal transmissions is near Prangins. Prangins also hosts one of the branches of the Swiss National Museum. The Aerodrome La Côte (ICAO: LSGP) is situated between Prangins and Gland which hosted a fly-in in 2009.

== Politics ==
In the 2007 federal election the most popular party was the SVP which received 18.77% of the vote. The next three most popular parties were the SP (18.76%), the Green Party (16.53%) and the LPS Party (13.86%). In the federal election, a total of 960 votes were cast, and the voter turnout was 47.2%.

== Economy ==
As of 2010, Prangins had an unemployment rate of 5%. As of 2008, there were 36 people employed in the primary economic sector and about 11 businesses involved in this sector. 746 people were employed in the secondary sector and there were 17 businesses in this sector. 550 people were employed in the tertiary sector, with 85 businesses in this sector. There were 1,629 residents of the municipality who were employed in some capacity, of which females made up 44.9% of the workforce.

In 2008 the total number of full-time equivalent jobs was 1,227. The number of jobs in the primary sector was 25, of which 23 were in agriculture and 2 were in forestry or lumber production. The number of jobs in the secondary sector was 717 of which 628 or (87.6%) were in manufacturing and 89 (12.4%) were in construction. The number of jobs in the tertiary sector was 485. In the tertiary sector; 41 or 8.5% were in wholesale or retail sales or the repair of motor vehicles, 14 or 2.9% were in the movement and storage of goods, 41 or 8.5% were in a hotel or restaurant, 7 or 1.4% were in the information industry, 8 or 1.6% were the insurance or financial industry, 24 or 4.9% were technical professionals or scientists, 23 or 4.7% were in education and 134 or 27.6% were in health care.

In 2000, there were 1,017 workers who commuted into the municipality and 1,312 workers who commuted away. The municipality is a net exporter of workers, with about 1.3 workers leaving the municipality for every one entering. About 7.3% of the workforce coming into Prangins are coming from outside Switzerland, while 0.1% of the locals commute out of Switzerland for work. Of the working population, 18.4% used public transportation to get to work, and 65.8% used a private car.

== Religion ==
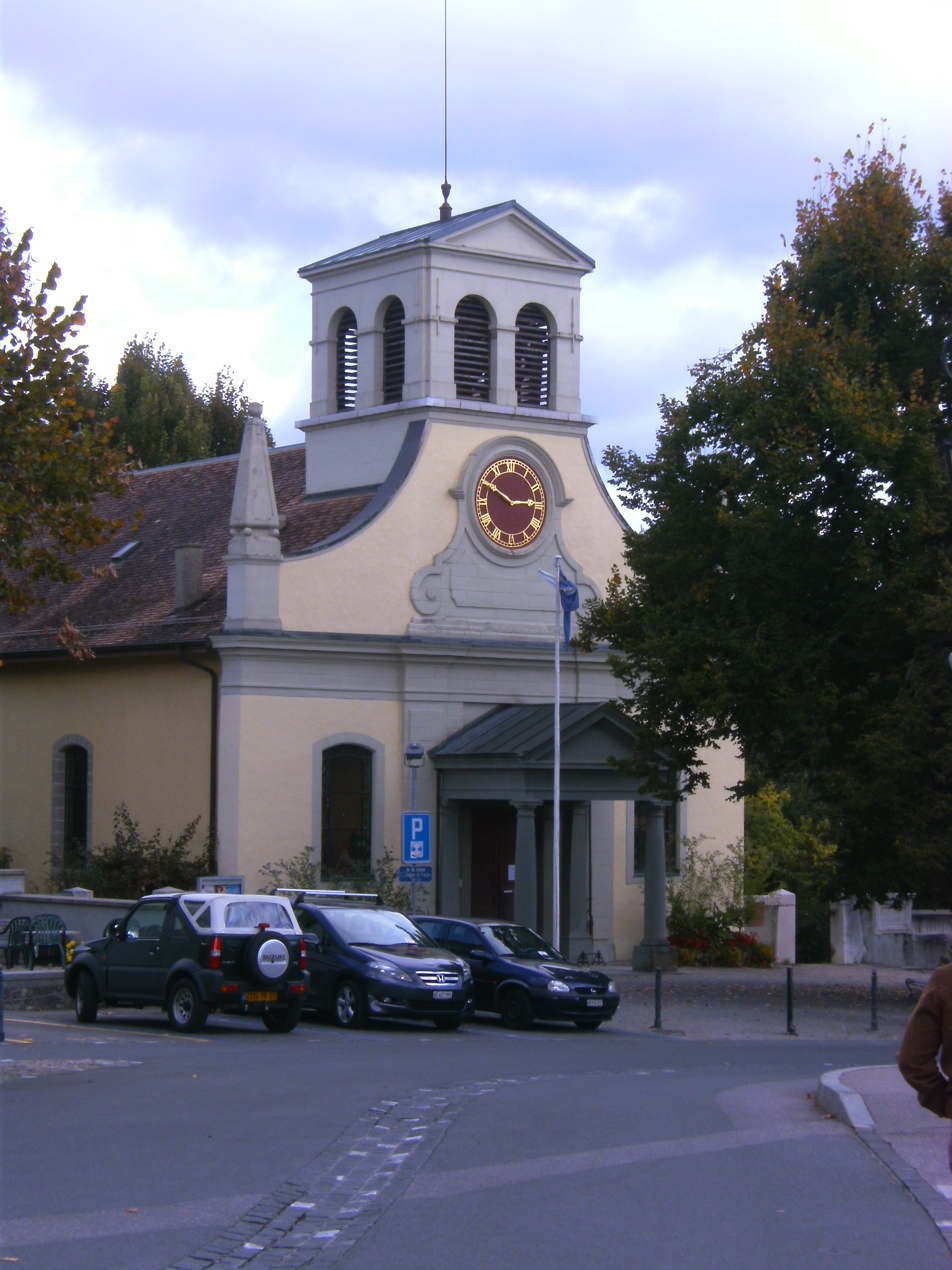
Church of Prangins

From the 2000 census, 1,092 or 34.9% were Roman Catholic, while 1,085 or 34.6% belonged to the Swiss Reformed Church. Of the rest of the population, there were 26 members of an Orthodox church (or about 0.83% of the population), there were 4 individuals (or about 0.13% of the population) who belonged to the Christian Catholic Church, and there were 141 individuals (or about 4.50% of the population) who belonged to another Christian church. There were 9 individuals (or about 0.29% of the population) who were Jewish, and 54 (or about 1.72% of the population) who were Islamic. There were 2 individuals who were Buddhist, 8 individuals who were Hindu and 7 individuals who belonged to another church. 542 (or about 17.30% of the population) belonged to no church, are agnostic or atheist, and 213 individuals (or about 6.80% of the population) did not answer the question.

== Education ==
In Prangins about 1,073 or (34.2%) of the population have completed non-mandatory upper secondary education, and 744 or (23.7%) have completed additional higher education (either university or a Fachhochschule). Of the 744 who completed tertiary schooling, 42.2% were Swiss men, 27.3% were Swiss women, 16.9% were non-Swiss men and 13.6% were non-Swiss women.

In the 2009/2010 school year there were a total of 443 students in the Prangins school district. In the Vaud cantonal school system, two years of non-obligatory pre-school are provided by the political districts. During the school year, the political district provided pre-school care for a total of 1,249 children of which 563 children (45.1%) received subsidized pre-school care. The canton's primary school program requires students to attend for four years. There were 243 students in the municipal primary school program. The obligatory lower secondary school program lasts for six years and there were 196 students in those schools. There were also 4 students who were home schooled or attended another non-traditional school.

Prangins is home to 1 museum, the Musée national suisse - Château de Prangins. In 2009 it was visited by 54,703 visitors (the average in previous years was 53,583).

As of 2000, there were 18 students in Prangins who came from another municipality, while 293 residents attended schools outside the municipality.
