= Swiss National Museum =

Museum in Zurich, Switzerland

Coordinates: 47°22′45″N 8°32′23″E

- Landesmuseum
- Swiss National Museum in 2026
- Established: 1898
- Location: Museumstrasse 2, Zurich, Switzerland
- Type: National museum
- Website: landesmuseum.ch/en

The Swiss National Museum (German: Landesmuseum, French: Musée national) is a museum in Zurich, Switzerland's largest city, adjacent to Zürich Hauptbahnhof (main railway station) and the Platzspitz park. It is part of the Musée Suisse Group, which is itself affiliated with the Federal Office of Culture.

== Architecture ==
The museum building of 1898 in the historicist style was built by Gustav Gull in the form of the French Renaissance city chateaus. His impressive architecture with dozens of towers, courts and his astonishing park on a peninsula between the rivers Sihl and Limmat has become one of the main sights of the Old Town district of Zurich. Its inauguration was filmed by François-Henri Lavanchy-Clarke, the first non-french concessionary of the Lumière brothers. Due to increasing space constraints, the museum was expanded between 2013 and 2016.

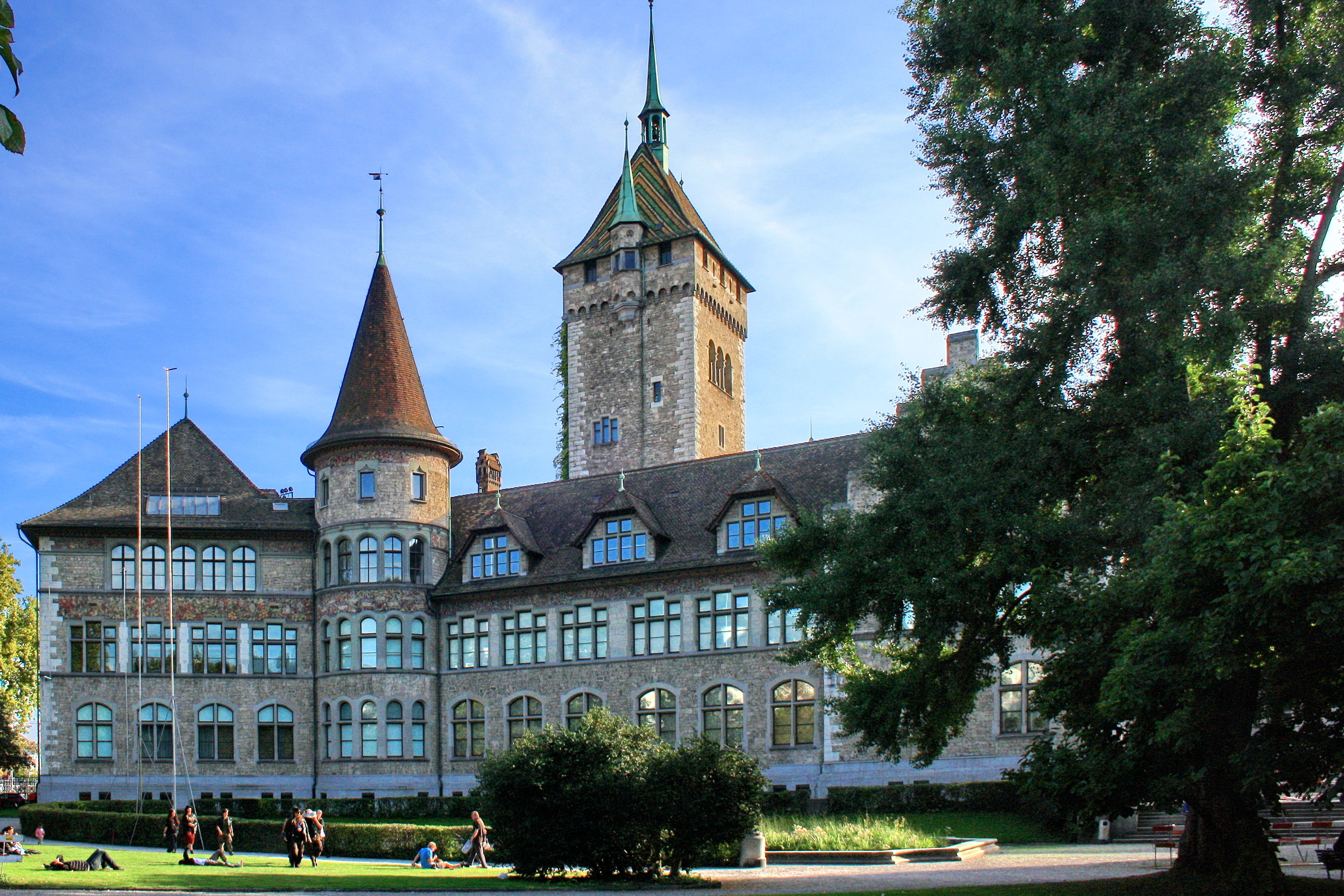
The museum before its extension, as seen from the Platzspitz park (2009)

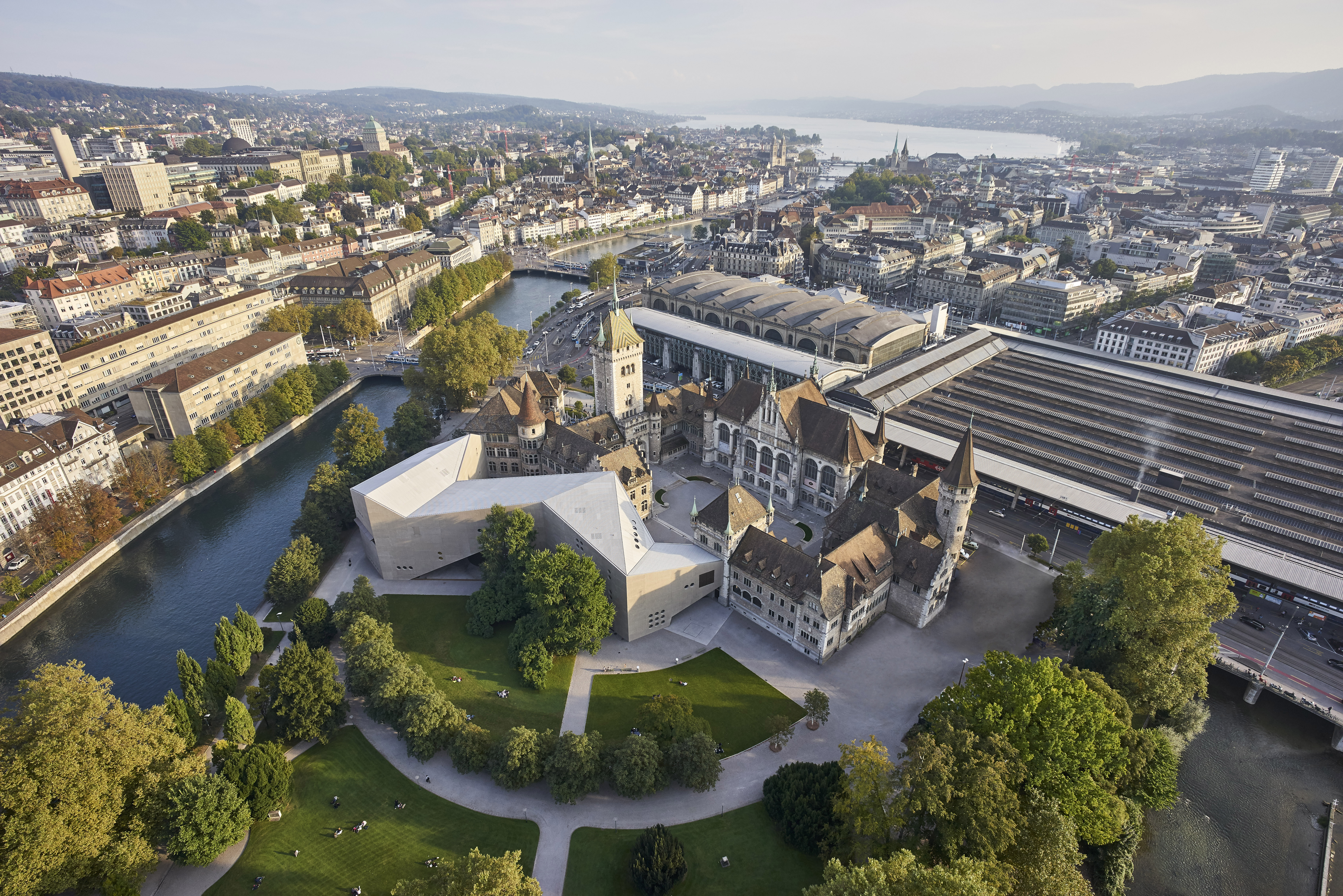
Aerial view of the museum with extension in 2016

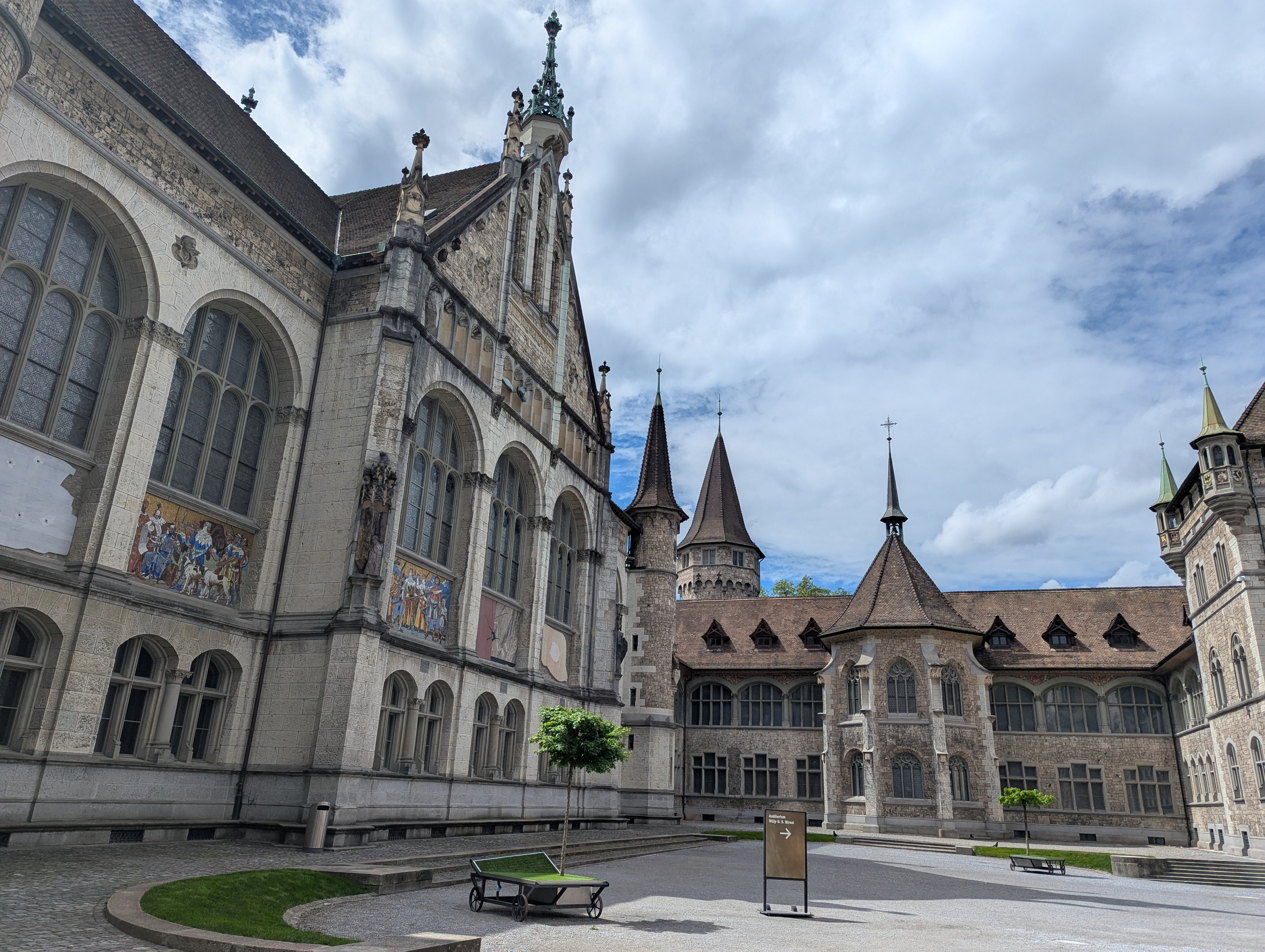
Courtyard (view as a 360° interactive panorama)

== Exhibits ==
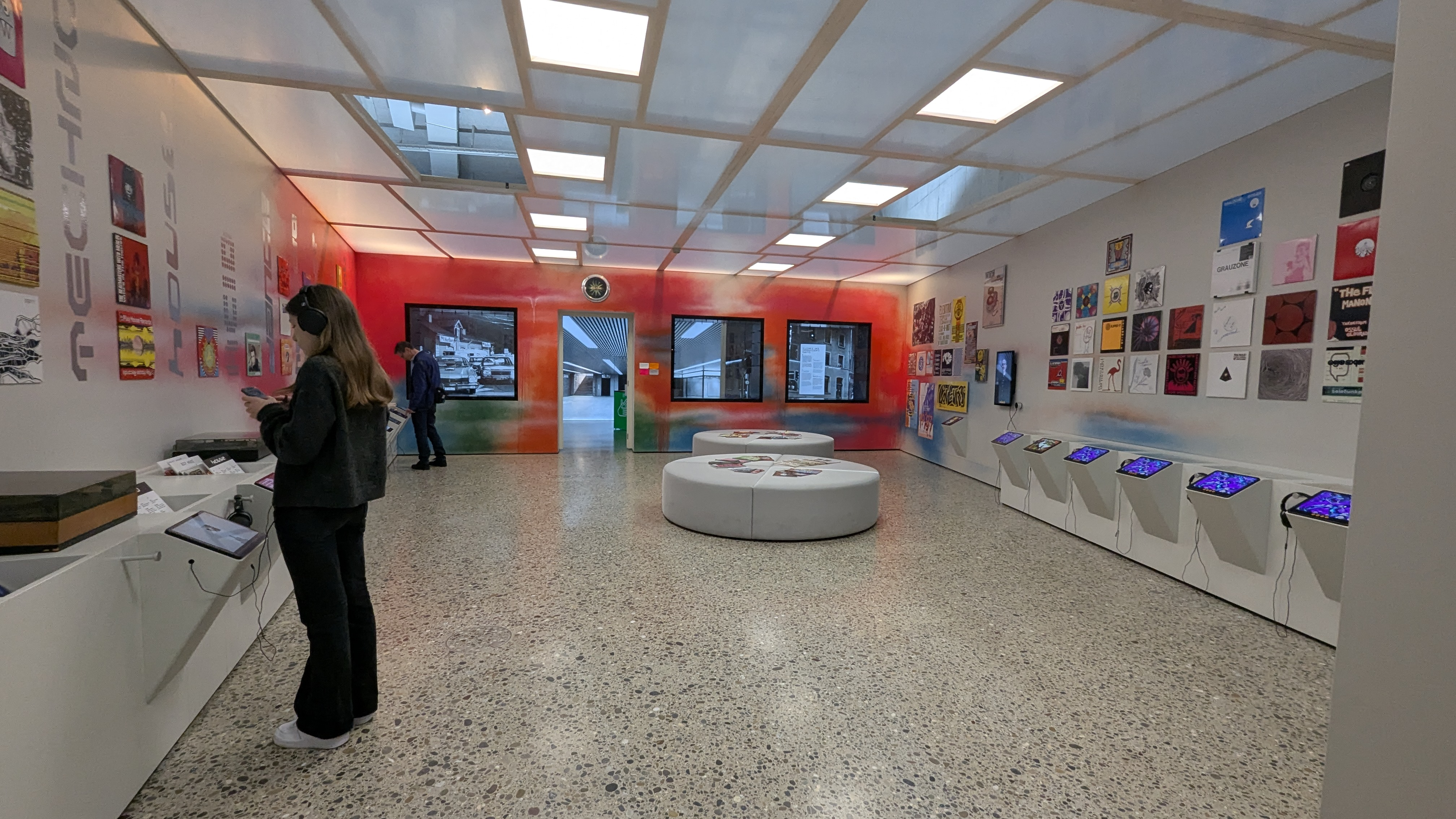
The music room.

The exhibition tour takes the visitor from prehistory through ancient times and the Middle Ages to the 21st century (classic modern art and art of the 16th, 17th and 18th century is settled mainly in the Kunsthaus Zürich in a different part of the city). There is a very rich section with gothic art, chivalry and a comprehensive collection of liturgical wooden sculptures, panel paintings and carved altars. Zunfthaus zur Meisen near Fraumünster church houses the porcelain and faience collection of the Swiss National Museum. There are also: a Collections Gallery, a place where Swiss furnishings are exhibited, an Armoury Tower, a diorama of the Battle of Murten, and a Coin Cabinet showing 14th, 15th, 16th century Swiss coins and even some coins from the Middle Ages.

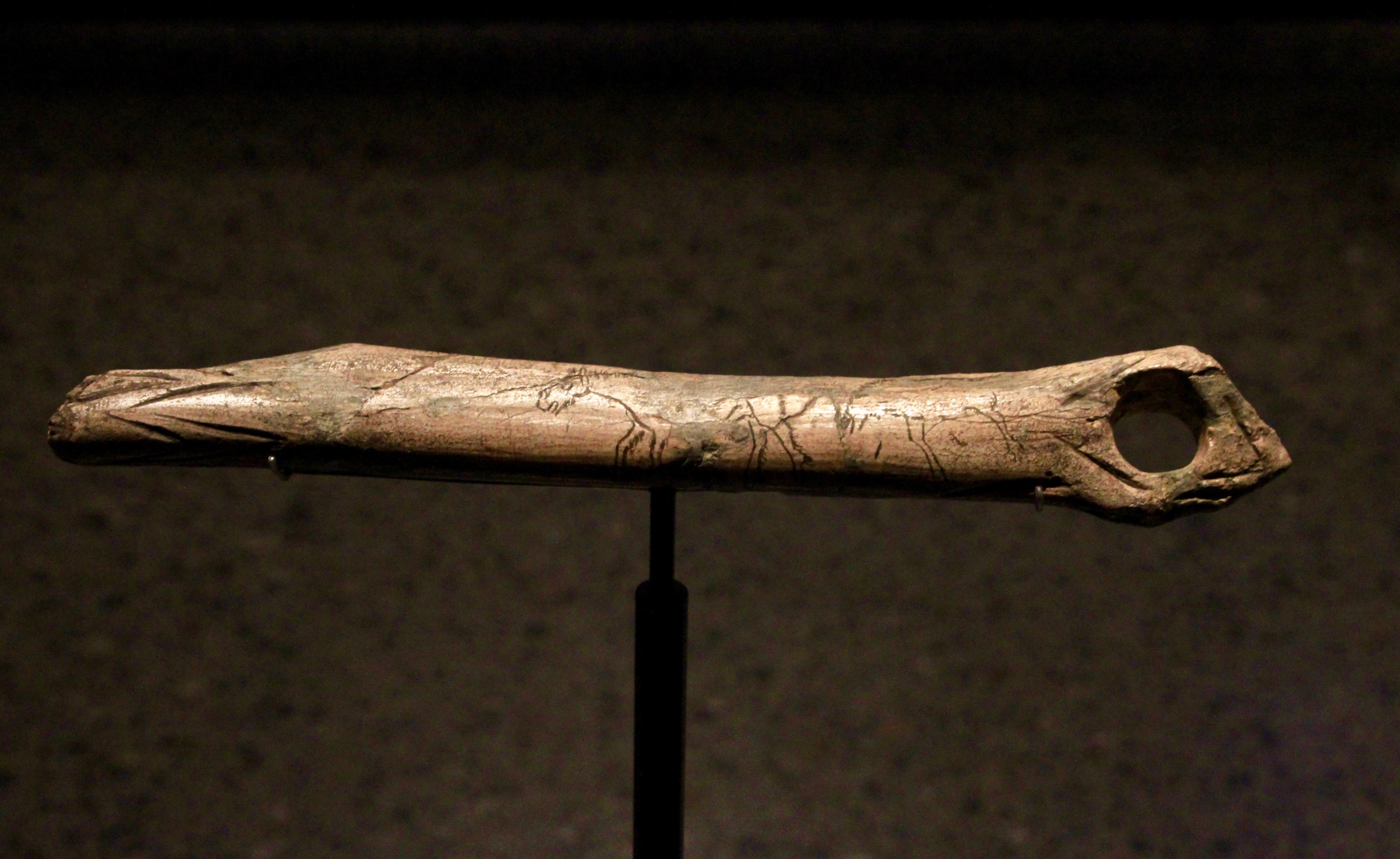
Paleolithic baton with engraved wild horses, found at Schweizersbild, Schaffhausen

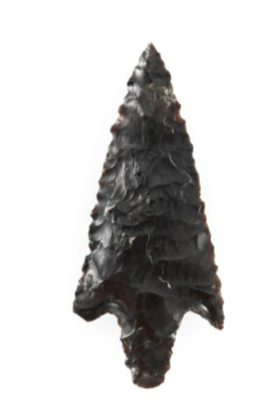
Neolithic arrowhead, found at Estavayer FR

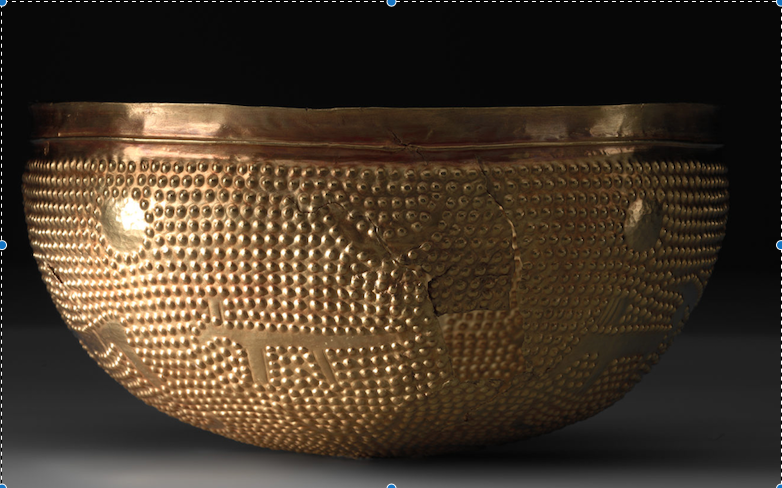
Gold cup of Altstetten from the late Bronze Age, discovered in Zurich Altstetten

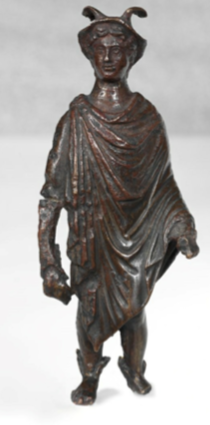
Bronze statuette of the god Mercury, dressed in a toga and a winged hat, found in Uster

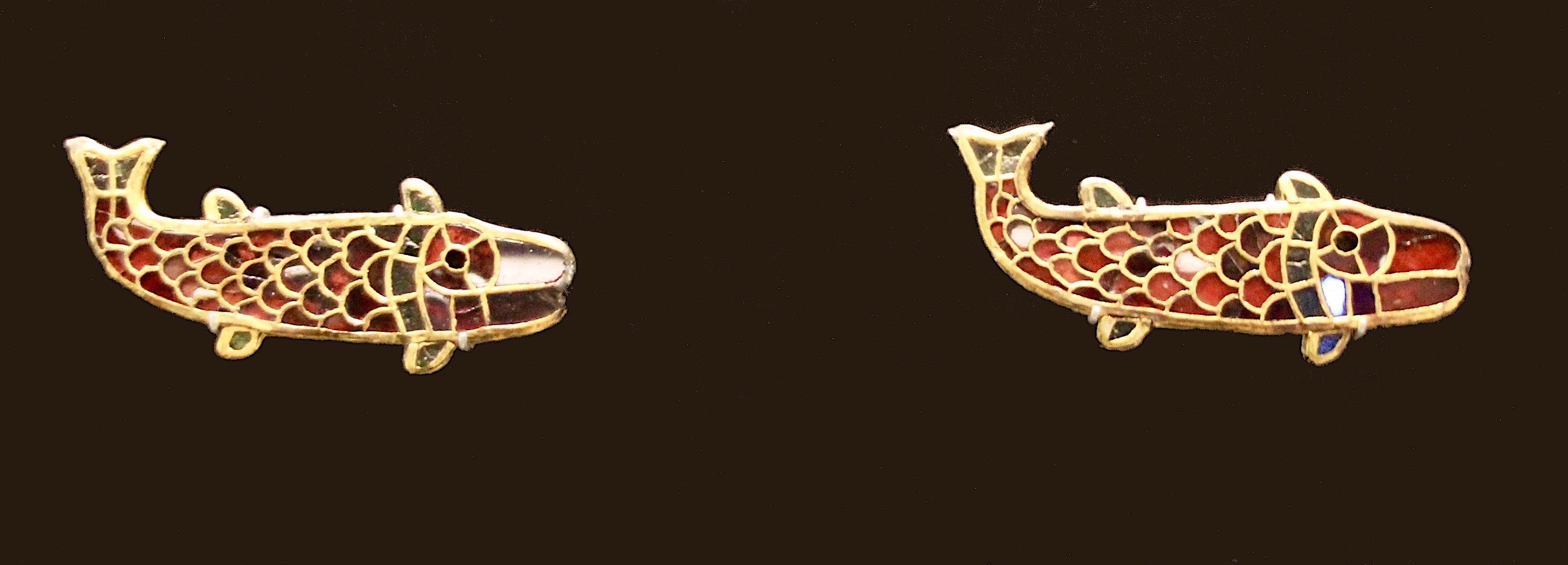
Fish-shaped Merovingian fibula made from almandine wafers and silver leaf (6th century AD), found inside a woman's tomb in Bülach

== Transport ==
The museum is located next to Zürich HB, Zurich's main railway station. In addition, boats of the Zürichsee-Schifffahrtsgesellschaft start their round trips (Swiss National Museum–Wollishofen–Zürichhorn) on the Limmat at the Swiss National Museum. The closest tram/trolleybus stop is Bahnhofquai/HB.

== See also ==
- Collection Center of the Swiss National Museum
- List of museums in Switzerland
