= List of rack railways =

This is a list of rack railways, both operating and closed.

== Africa ==
=== Angola ===
| Location | Name of system | Date opened | Date closed | Route length | Gauge | Notes |
|---|---|---|---|---|---|---|
| Lobito and Tenke | Benguela railway | 1905 | | 1,866 km (1,159 mi) | 3 ft 6 in (1,067 mm) | Lengue gorge on Benguela railway – 1906. 1,067 mm (3 ft 6 in) gauge. |

=== South Africa ===
| Location | Name of system | Date opened | Date closed | Route length | Gauge | Notes |
|---|---|---|---|---|---|---|
| Waterval Boven and Waterval Onder | NZASM | 1887 | 13 October 1908 | 1,147 km (713 mi) | 3 ft 6 in (1,067 mm) | There used to be a Riggenbach rack railway built by the NZASM between Waterval Boven and Waterval Onder. It was in operation until 1908. 3 ft 6 in (1,067 mm) gauge. |

== Asia ==
=== China ===
| Location | Name of system | Date opened | Date closed | Route length | Gauge | Notes |
|---|---|---|---|---|---|---|
| Dujiangyan | Dujiangyan–Siguniangshan mountain railway | 2024~2025 | | | | (under construction, to be opened in 2024~2025) |

=== Indonesia ===
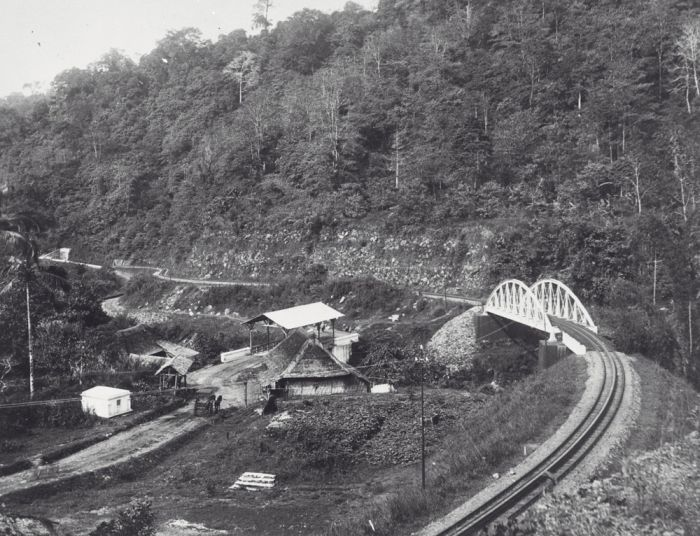
The State Railways of West Sumatra in 1898

- The former State Railways of West Sumatra's line between Kayu Tanam and Batu Tabal (reactivation pending), and Padang Panjang to Payakumbuh (disused).
- The former Netherlands East Indies Railways' line between Ambarawa and Gemawang, on the Kedungjati-Ambarawa-Magelang-Yogyakarta line. Only the Ambarawa-Bedono section is in operation as a tourist line.

Both railways used the Riggenbach system.

=== Japan ===
- Ikawa Line, Oigawa Railway
- Usui Pass was the first rack and pinion line in Japan, on the Shin-Etsu Line of the then Japanese National Railway. It was replaced in 1963 by a new parallel adhesion line, and in turn replaced by the Nagano Shinkansen line opened for the 1998 Winter Olympics at Nagano.

=== Lebanon ===
| Location | Name of system | Date opened | Date closed | Route length | Gauge | Notes |
|---|---|---|---|---|---|---|
| Beirut | A rack railway used to exist on the climb from Beirut to Syria | | | | 1,050 mm (3 ft 5 11/32 in) | |

=== Philippines ===
| Location | Name of system | Date opened | Date closed | Route length | Gauge | Notes |
|---|---|---|---|---|---|---|
| Manila | The Manila Railway and Manila Railroad companies (now the Philippine National Railways) | 1914 | 1917 | | | Briefly operated oil burning cog locomotives starting in 1914 until 1917. One of these locomotives were named Mirador, named after one of the mountains along the proposed Aringay–Baguio line. |

=== Vietnam ===
| Location | Name of system | Date opened | Date closed | Route length | Gauge | Notes |
|---|---|---|---|---|---|---|
| Da Lat | Da Lat–Thap Cham railway | 1932 | | 84 km (52 mi) | | The Đà Lạt-Tháp Chàm Railway in Southern Vietnam. Abandoned after the Vietnam War, although a 7 km section remains in use as a tourist attraction. Built in the 1920s, the 84 km line had a cogwheel part 34 km long, running through four tunnels with a total length of almost 1,000 meters, taking trains from the Krongpha Pass up the Ngoan Muc (Bellevue) Pass to Da Lat. |

== Europe ==
=== Austria ===
- Achensee Railway (Achenseebahn), Tyrol 1,000 mm (3 ft 3 3/8 in)
- Erzberg Railway (Erzbergbahn), Styria
- Gaisberg Railway (Gaisbergbahn), Gaisberg (1887–1928)
- Kahlenberg Railway (Kahlenbergbahn), Kahlenberg, Döbling, Vienna (1872–1920)
- Schafberg Railway (Schafbergbahn), Upper Austria 1,000 mm (3 ft 3 3/8 in)
- Schneeberg Railway (Schneebergbahn), Lower Austria

=== Czech Republic ===
- Cog railway Tanvald-Harrachov

=== France ===
- Lyon Metro Line C
- Montenvers Railway
- Petit train de la Rhune
- Panoramique des Domes

=== Germany ===
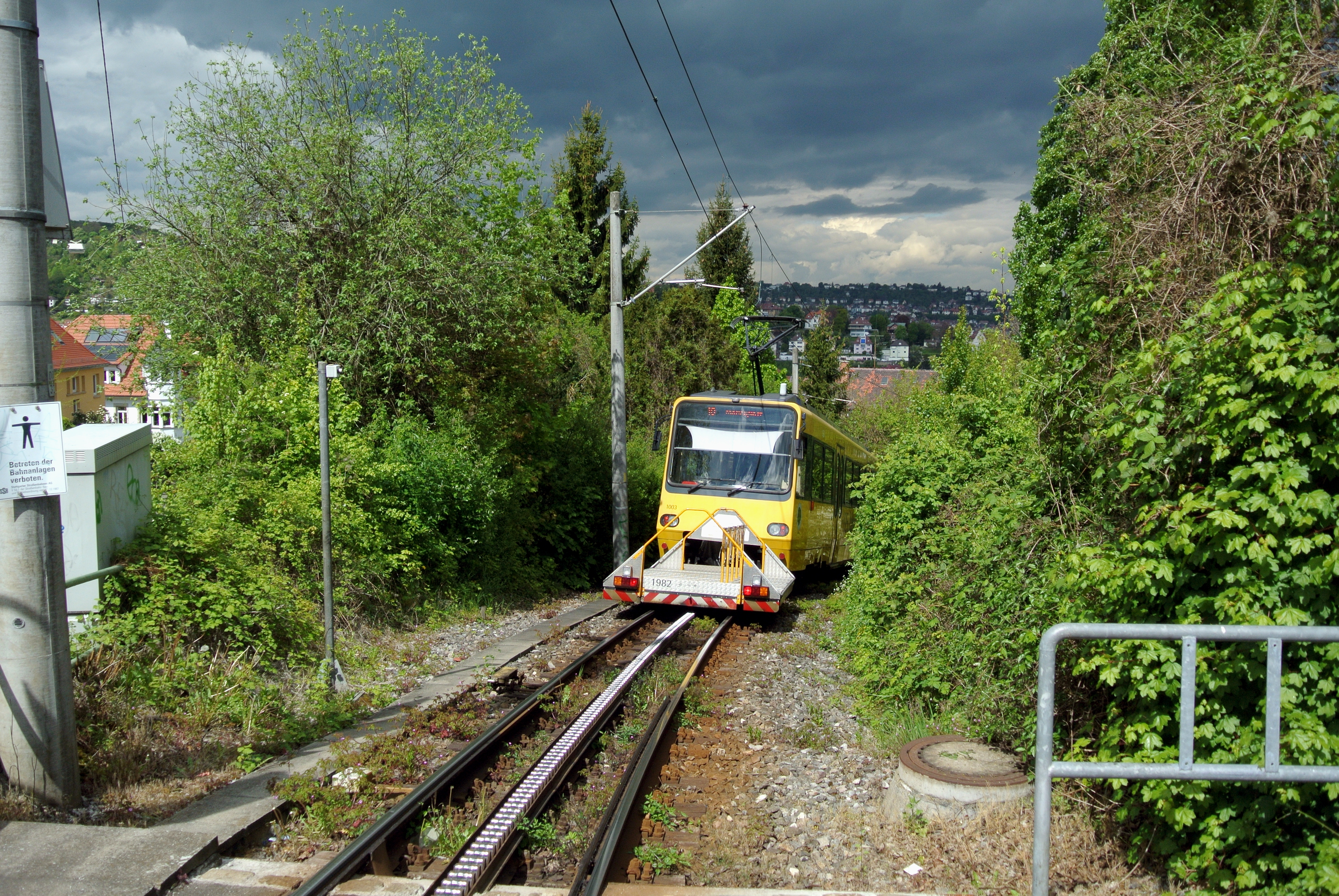
Stuttgart Rack Railway with wagon to transport bicycles

- Drachenfels Railway (Drachenfelsbahn)
- Höllentalbahn (adhesion only since 1933)
- Murg Valley Railway (adhesion only since 1926)
- Stuttgart Rack Railway, Stuttgart
- Wendelstein Rack Railway (Wendelsteinbahn)
- Bavarian Zugspitze Railway (Bayerische Zugspitzbahn)

=== Greece ===
| Location | Name of system | Date opened | Date closed | Route length | Gauge | Notes |
|---|---|---|---|---|---|---|
| Diakopto to Kalavryta | Diakopto–Kalavryta railway | 10 March 1896 | | 22.346 km (13.885 mi) | 750 mm (2 ft 5 1/2 in) | |

=== Hungary ===
- Fogaskerekű Vasút in Budapest, Hungary is a kind of cog-wheel tram in the hilly Buda part of the city.

=== Italy ===
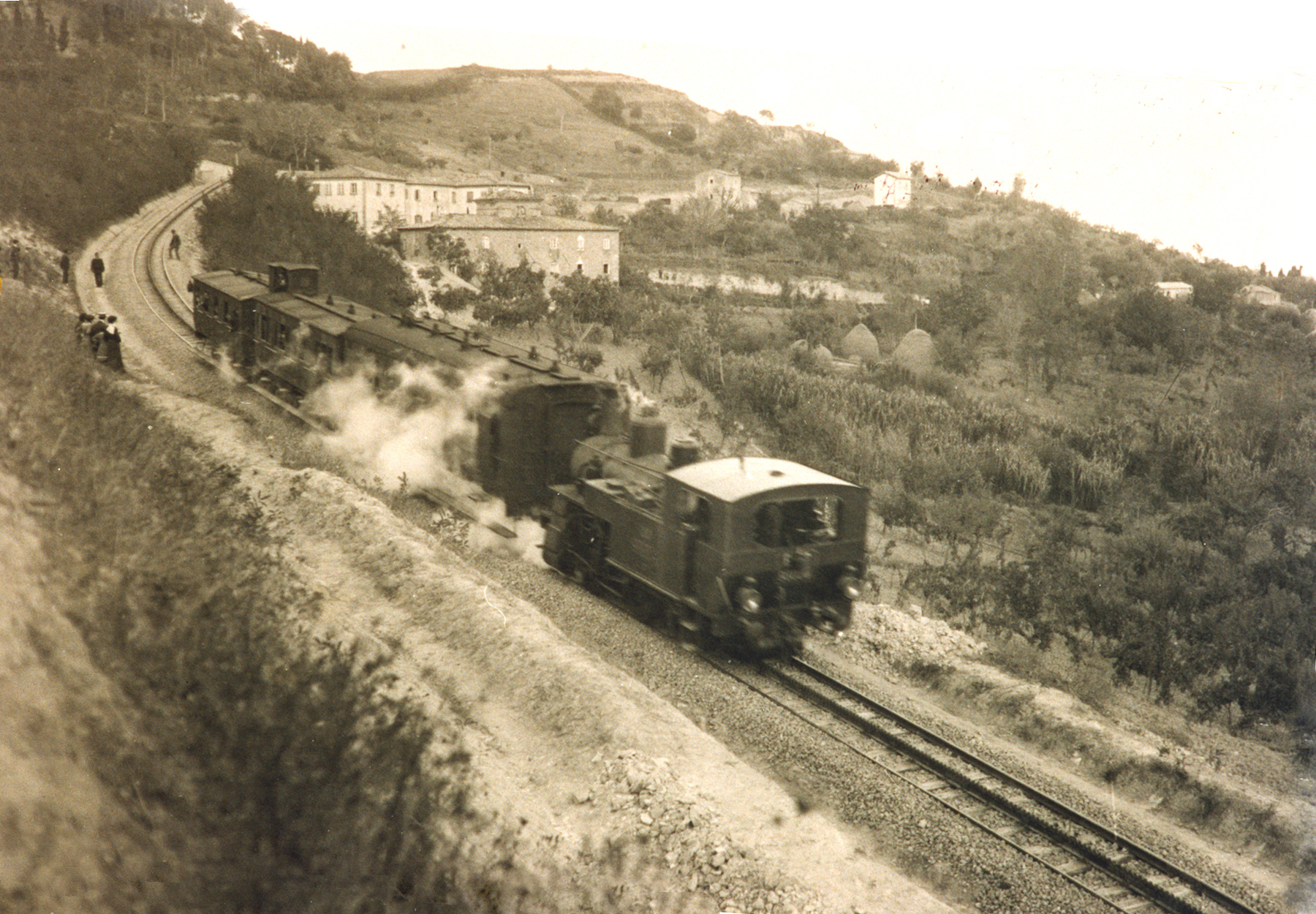
Rack railway Saline-Volterra, built with Strub system. Italy, about 1920

- Mont Cenis Pass Railway; temporary while main tunnel built.
- Vesuvius Funicular (1880–1944; originally built as a funicular and then changed to a rack railway. It was the only railway climbing an active volcano. It was destroyed various times by Vesuvius eruptions. With its last destruction in 1944, it was never built again. It is famous worldwide as a result of the song "Funiculì Funiculà" written about it)
- Opicina Tramway (1902–1928; rack replaced with a funicular section)
- Rittnerbahn (rack section closed)
- Sassi–Superga tramway
- Principe–Granarolo rack railway in the city of Genoa
- S.Ellero – Saltino (1892–1922; it was the first rack railway built in Italy)
- Lagonegro-Castrovillari-Spezzano Albanese of Ferrovie Calabro Lucane (1915–1978; it consisted of a series of separated lines which had to be unified into a single one but the project was never completed)
- Vibo Valentia-Mileto of Ferrovie Calabro Lucane (1917–1966; it was a local rack railway localized in south Italy)
- Rocchette-Asiago (1910–1958; it was the highest Italian rack railway)
- Catanzaro Città – Catanzaro Sala of Ferrovie della Calabria (Actually on service; it connects the city of Catanzaro to the borough of Sala)
- Paola-Cosenza of Ferrovie dello Stato (1915–1987; it was replaced by a tunnel)
- Saline-Volterra of Ferrovie dello Stato (1863–1958; it was part of a railway which connected Cecina to Volterra. Downstream flat line, from Cecina to Saline, is actually on service)
- Dittaino-Leonforte of Ferrovie dello Stato (1918–1959; it was located on the island of Sicily)
- Dittaino-Piazza Armerina of Ferrovie dello Stato (1912–1971; it was dismissed after a series of landslides which damaged some parts of the line)
- Lercara Bassa-Filaga-Palazzo Adriano-Magazzolo of Ferrovie dello Stato (1924–1959; it was used for mining and workers transports in Sicily )
- Agrigento-Naro-Licata (1911–1960; it was used to transport sulfur extracted from mines located on the island of Sicily)

=== Portugal ===
| Location | Name of system | Date opened | Date closed | Route length | Gauge | Notes |
|---|---|---|---|---|---|---|
| Funchal and Terreiro da Luta | Monte Railway | 16 July 1893 | April 1943 | 3.9 km (2.4 mi) | 1,000 mm (3 ft 3 3/8 in) | Monte Railway – there was previously a cog railway from Funchal to Monte in Madeira Island, which operated between 1893 and 1943, and went further up to Terreiro da Luta at 867 m above sea level. |

=== Romania ===
| Location | Name of system | Date opened | Date closed | Route length | Gauge | Notes |
|---|---|---|---|---|---|---|
| Bouțari and Sarmizegetusa | Caransebeș-Bouțari-Subcetate railway | 1 May 1909 | 1978 | 76.93 km (47.80 mi) | 1,435 mm (4 ft 8 1/2 in) | Bouțari - Sarmizegetusa segment of Caransebeș - Subcetate railway, measuring 76.93 km, between 1909 and 1978. |

=== Slovakia ===
- Štrbské Pleso – Štrba rack railway
- Brezno – Tisovec rack railway
- Žakarovce rack railway (Marienhütte ironworks)

=== Spain ===
| Location | Name of system | Date opened | Date closed | Route length | Gauge | Notes |
|---|---|---|---|---|---|---|
| Monistrol de Montserrat, Barcelona | Montserrat Rack Railway | 1892 re-opened 6 June 2003 | 12 May 1957 | 5 km (3.1 mi) | 1,000 mm (3 ft 3 3/8 in) | Cogwheel railway that transports visitors from Monistrol de Montserrat train station up to the Monastery at the summit of Montserrat Mountain. |
| Pyrenees, Catalonia | Vall de Núria Rack Railway | 22 March 1931 | | 12.5 km (7.8 mi) | 1,000 mm (3 ft 3 3/8 in) | Connects Ribes de Freser and Queralbs to the Vall de Núria resort, which is inaccessible by road. |

=== Switzerland ===
- Altstätten–Gais railway (AB)
- Aigle–Leysin railway line
- Aigle–Ollon–Monthey–Champéry railway line
- Chemin de fer Bex-Villars-Bretaye
- Chemins de fer électriques Veveysans (CEV)
- Bernese Oberland Railway (BOB)
- Brienz Rothorn Railway
- Martigny–Châtelard Railway (MC)
- Montreux–Glion–Rochers-de-Naye railway line
- Dampfbahn Furka-Bergstrecke (DFB)
- Dolderbahn (Db)
- Gornergrat Railway (owned by BVZ Holding and managed by MGB)
- Joweid Zahnradbahn (a now closed freight line)
- Jungfrau Railway – the highest rack railway in Europe
- Lausanne-Ouchy (1958-2006), see Métro Lausanne–Ouchy#History; now Lausanne Metro's M2 line
- Lausanne Flon-Gare
- Matterhorn Gotthard Railway (MGB) (former Furka Oberalp Bahn and Brig-Visp-Zermatt Railway)
- Mühleggbahn (1950-1975, funicular before and afterwards)
- Monte Generoso railway
- Pilatus Railway
- Rigi Railways (Arth-Rigi and Vitznau-Rigi railways)
- Rorschach–Heiden railway (RHB, now AB), Rorschach to Heiden
- Wengernalp Railway – (WAB), the longest continuous rack railway in the world
- Zentralbahn (Zb) (former Brünig railway line and Luzern–Stans–Engelberg railway line)

=== United Kingdom ===
| Location | Name of system | Date opened | Date closed | Route length | Gauge | Notes |
|---|---|---|---|---|---|---|
| Beamish, County Durham | Beamish Cog Railway | | | | | |
| Llanberis, Gwynedd, Wales | Snowdon Mountain Railway | April 6, 1896 | | 4.7 mi or 7.6 km | 800mm | |

== North America ==
=== Mexico ===
- The 762 mm (2 ft 6 in) gauge Mapimi Railroad in Durango State had a short Abt rack section from El Cambio to Ojuela. The maximum grade was 13.6% and it was worked by two Baldwin 0-6-2T steam locomotives built in 1896 and two Baldwin 2-6-2T steam locomotives built in 1898 and 1900. The railroad closed in the early 1930s.

=== Panama ===
- Large ships are guided through the Panama Canal Locks by electric locomotives known as mulas (mules), running on rack rails on the lock walls. The new locks, projected to open in 2015, will use tugs.

=== United States ===
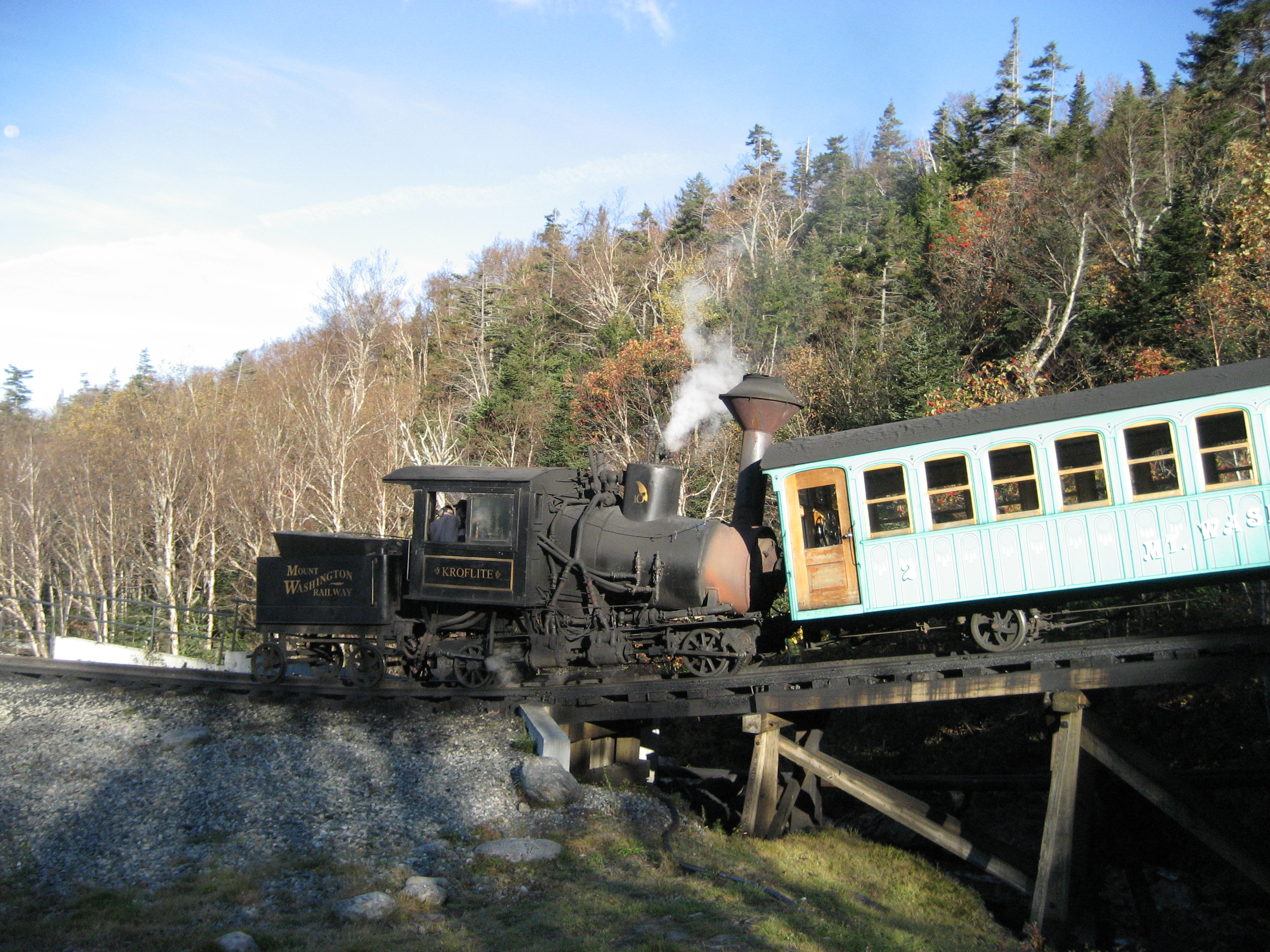
The Mount Washington Cog Railway in 2006

- The Chicago Tunnel Company (abandoned) used the Morgan rack system on the steep grade up to Grant Park.
- Pikes Peak Cog Railway, Manitou Springs, Colorado. Swiss-made Diesel-Pneumatic railcars, 1- or 2-car trains. Strub rack system, originally Abt.
- Mount Washington Cog Railway, Bretton Woods, New Hampshire. Bio Diesel & live steam cog train operations with Marsh rack system, world's first to be used as a mountain railway (inaugurated in 1868).
- Quincy and Torch Lake Cog Railway, cog rail tram opened in 1997. Hancock, Michigan.

== South America ==
=== Argentina ===
| Location | Name of system | Date opened | Date closed | Route length | Gauge | Notes |
|---|---|---|---|---|---|---|
| Mendoza and Los Andes | Transandine Railway | 1910 | 1984 | 248 km (154 mi) | 1,000 mm (3 ft 3 3/8 in) | Transandine Railway between Mendoza and Santa Rosa de Los Andes, Chile, see Chile below. |

=== Brazil ===
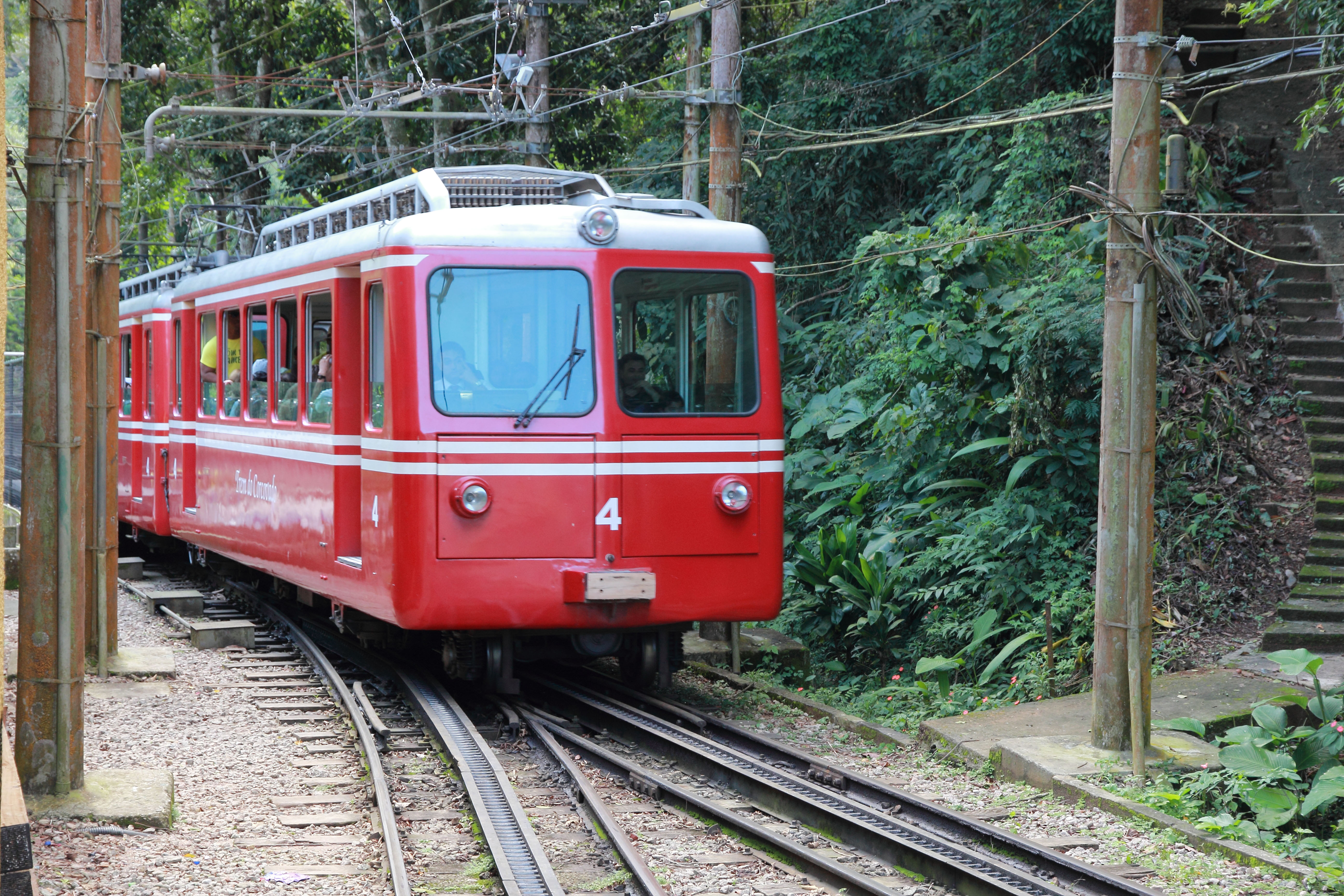
Corcovado Rack Railway in Rio de Janeiro, Brazil

- Corcovado Rack Railway
- The Estrada de Ferro Santos-Jundiaí which became part of Rede Ferroviária Federal Sociedade Anônima (RFFSA) 1957–1997, now owned by MRS Logística. 1,600 mm (5 ft 3 in) gauge between Paranapiacaba and Raiz de Serra.
- Teresopolis and Petropolis railways, both out of service, near Rio de Janeiro.

=== Chile ===
- Arica–La Paz railway, Arica–La Paz
- Santa Lucía Hill tramway (Abt system), Santiago (1902–1910)
- The Transandine Railway, Santa Rosa de Los Andes – Mendoza, Argentina The rebuild will be adhesion only and use a base tunnel.

=== Venezuela ===
| Location | Name of system | Date opened | Date closed | Route length | Gauge | Notes |
|---|---|---|---|---|---|---|
| Valencia | Puerto Cabello and Valencia Railway | 1883 | 1950's | 55 km (34 mi) | 3 ft 6 in (1,067 mm) | The Puerto Cabello and Valencia Railway (abandoned) was constructed in the 1880s. It used rack and pinion (Abt system) on a steep section at Trincheras. |

== Oceania ==
=== Australia ===
- West Coast Wilderness Railway in Tasmania, originally opened in 1896 to service the Mount Lyell copper mine and closed and lifted in 1960s. Rebuilt and re-opened for tourists in 2003. Uses the Abt rack system. 1,067 mm (3 ft 6 in) gauge.
- Dawson Valley railway line on Mount Morgan – rack system existed until 1952 when the line was deviated. Used the Abt rack system. 1,067 mm (3 ft 6 in) gauge.
- Ellalong Colliery – underground Lamella rack – installed in 1984
- Skitube – Lamella rack – in the Snowy Mountains, opened in 1987; 1,435 mm (4 ft 8 1/2 in) gauge.
- Blue Mountains sewerage project – temporary 610 mm (2 ft) gauge construction railway, 1995

== See also ==
- Mountain railway#List of mountain railways
- Rack railway
