= Cadillac Mountain =

Highest point of Hancock County, Maine, United States

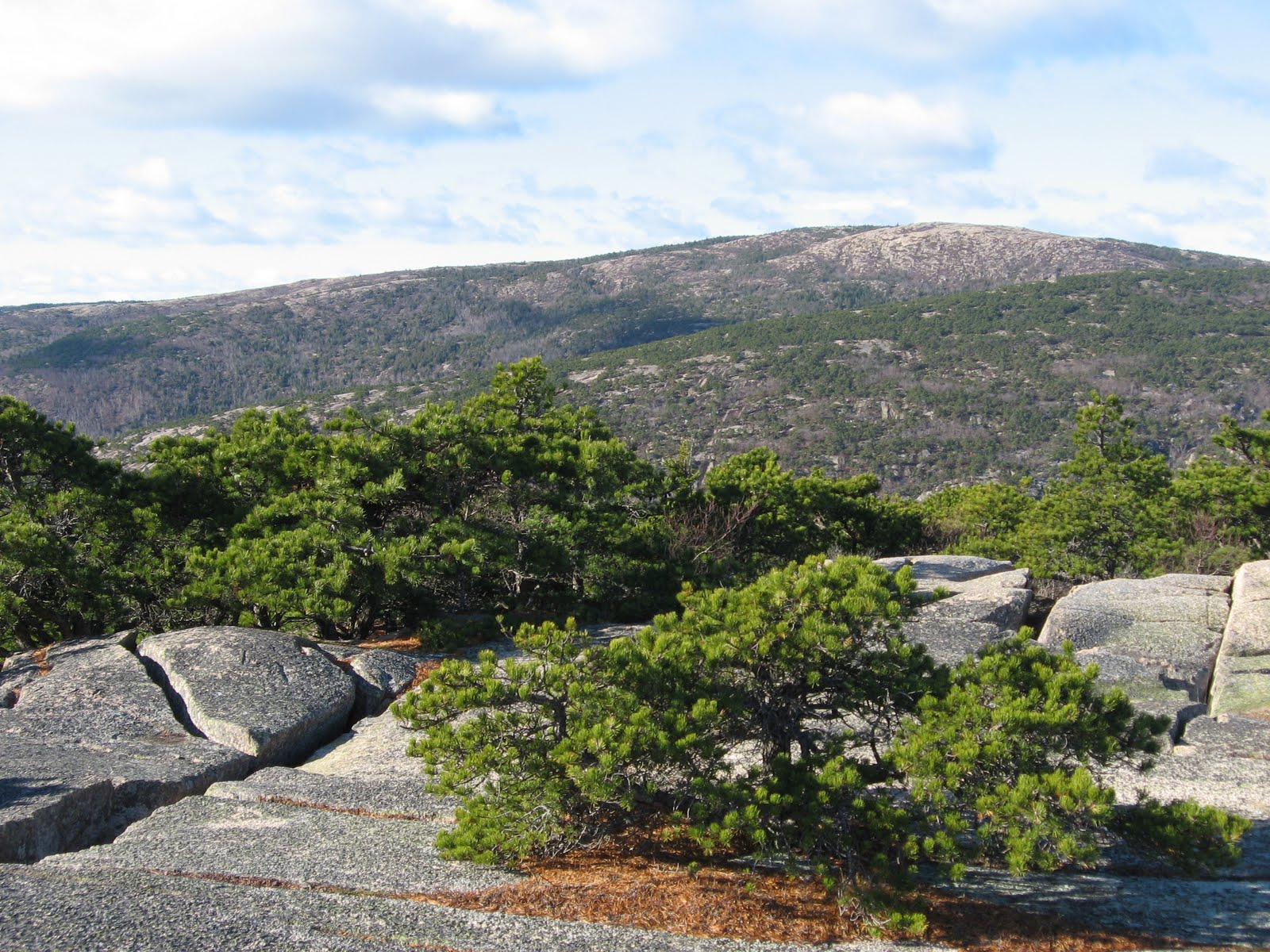
- Cadillac Mountain from Champlain Mountain

Highest point
- Elevation: 1,527 ft (465 m) NAVD 88
- Prominence: 1,527 ft (465 m)
- Coordinates: 44°21′05″N 68°13′35″W

Geography
- Location: Hancock County, Maine, U.S.
- Topo map: USGS Seal Harbor

Climbing
- Easiest route: Paved road or marked hiking trails

Cadillac Mountain is located on Mount Desert Island, within Acadia National Park, in the U.S. state of Maine. With an elevation of nearly 1,530 feet (470 meters), its summit is the highest point in Hancock County and the highest within 25 miles (40 km) of the Atlantic shoreline of the North American continent between the Cape Breton Highlands, Nova Scotia, and peaks in Mexico. It is known as the first place in the continental U.S. to see the sunrise, although that is only true for a portion of the year.

== History ==
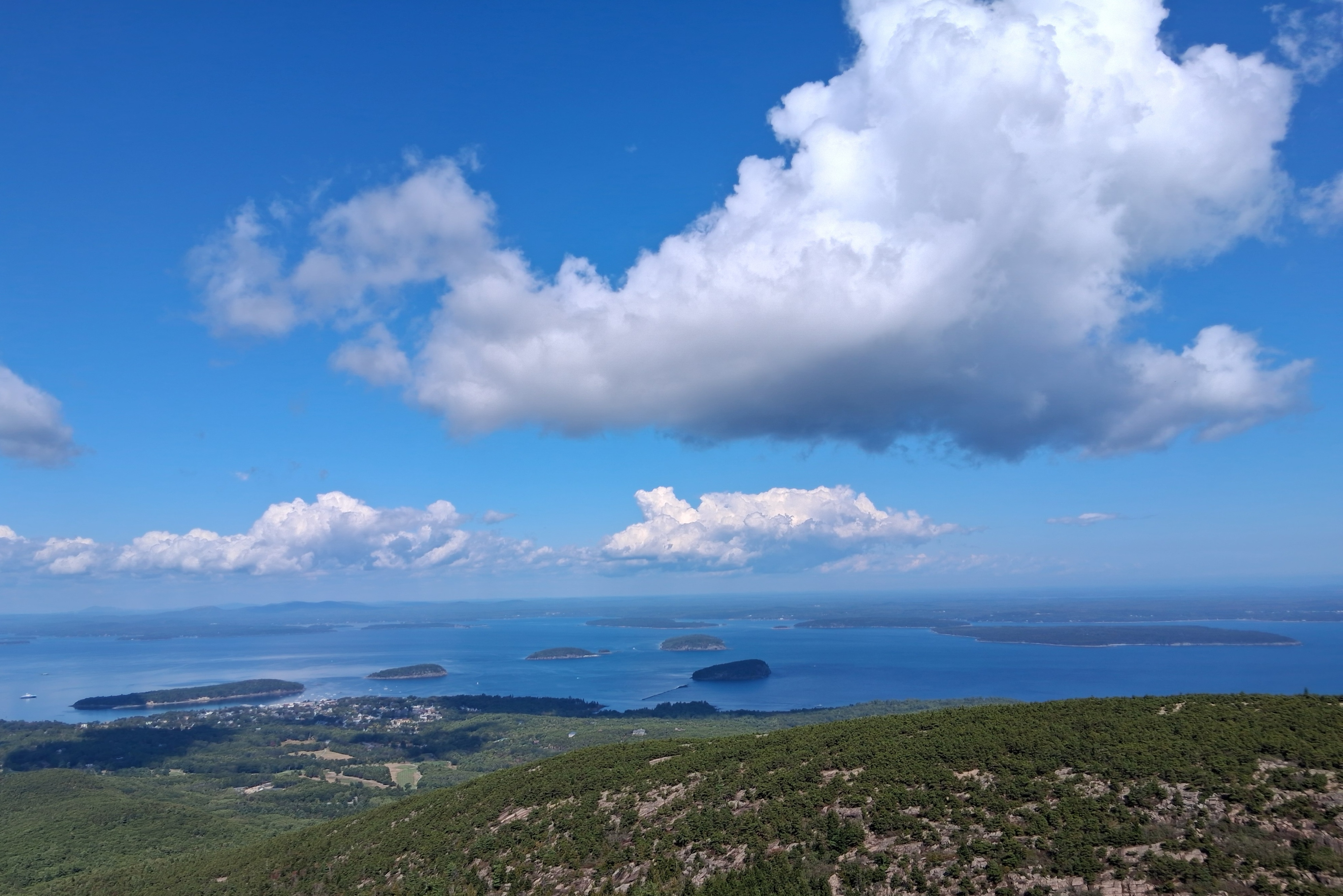
View from the summit of Cadillac Mountain

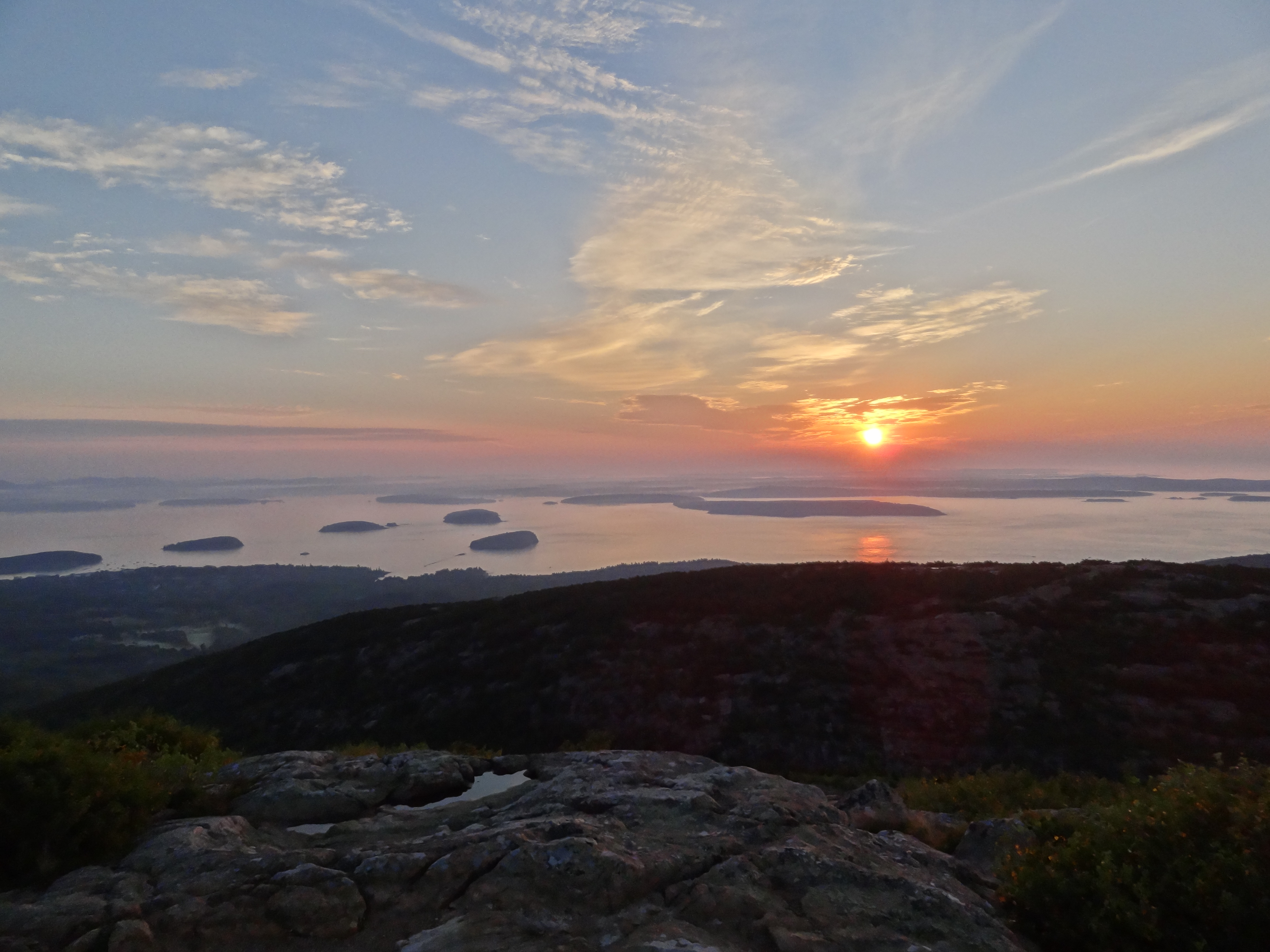
Sunrise from summit

Cadillac Mountain was originally inhabited by the Wabanaki People or the "People of the Dawn Land." The Wabanaki Confederacy consists of four tribes: Maliseet, Mi'kmaq, Passamaquoddy, and Penobscot. Mount Desert Island provided the Wabanaki with a place to meet, trade, fish, and hunt. Before its name Green Mountain, it was thought the natives referred to the mountain as the Passamaquoddy word Pesamkuk. Additional research indicates that Pesamkuk refers to Mount Desert Island in general, and the name of the mountain itself was Wapuwoc, meaning "white mountain of the first light."

In the 1500s, the natives were confronted with European colonization; however, they withstood the confrontation and continue to inhabit the land today.

Before being renamed in 1918, the mountain had been called Green Mountain. The new name honors the French explorer and adventurer Antoine de La Mothe Cadillac. In 1688, De la Mothe requested and received from the Governor of New France a parcel of land in an area known as Donaquec which included part of the Donaquec River (now the Union River) and the island of Mount Desert in the present-day U.S. state of Maine. Antoine Laumet de La Mothe, a shameless self-promoter who had already appropriated the "de la Mothe" portion of his name from a local nobleman in his native Picardy, thereafter referred to himself as Antoine de la Mothe, sieur de Cadillac, Donaquec, and Mount Desert.

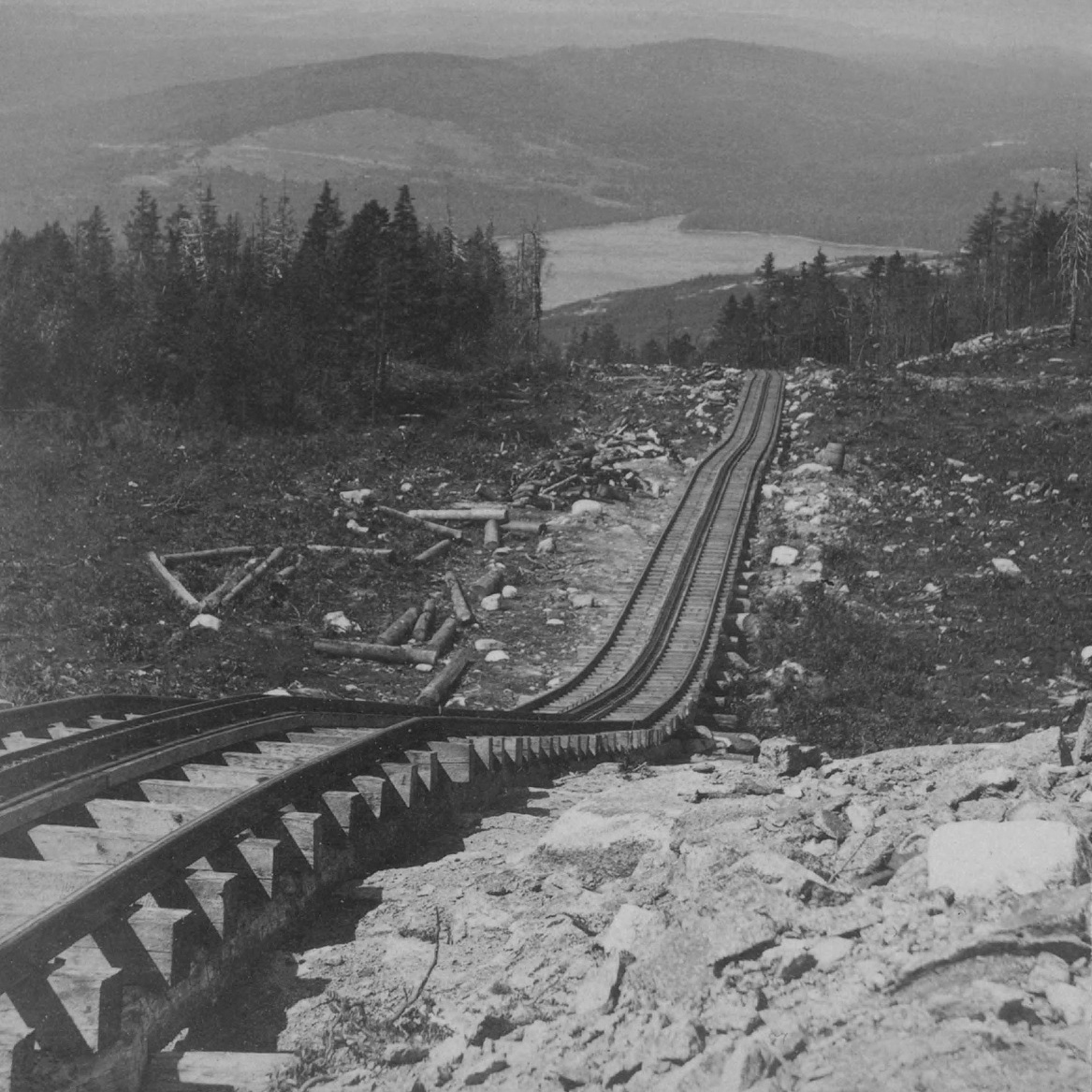
Green Mountain Cog Railway as seen in the late 1800s

From 1883 until 1893 the Green Mountain Cog Railway ran to the summit to take visitors to the Green Mountain Hotel. The hotel burned down in 1895 and the cog train was sold and moved to the Mount Washington Cog Railway in New Hampshire.

The summit also played a significant role during World War II as a base for early-warning warcraft detection. The mountain's height and location made it the ideal place for a radar facility to achieve strong signals. Today the mountain continues to be used for communication by the police, National Park Service, Coast Guard, and fire department.

There are various hiking trails and a paved road that lead to the summit of Cadillac Mountain. Going to the summit to see the first sunrise in the continental U.S. is a common activity; however, Cadillac only experiences the first sunrise from October 7 through March 6. For a few weeks around the equinoxes, the sun rises first at West Quoddy Head in Lubec, Maine. During the remainder of spring and throughout summer, the sun rises first on Mars Hill, 150 miles (240 km) to the northeast.

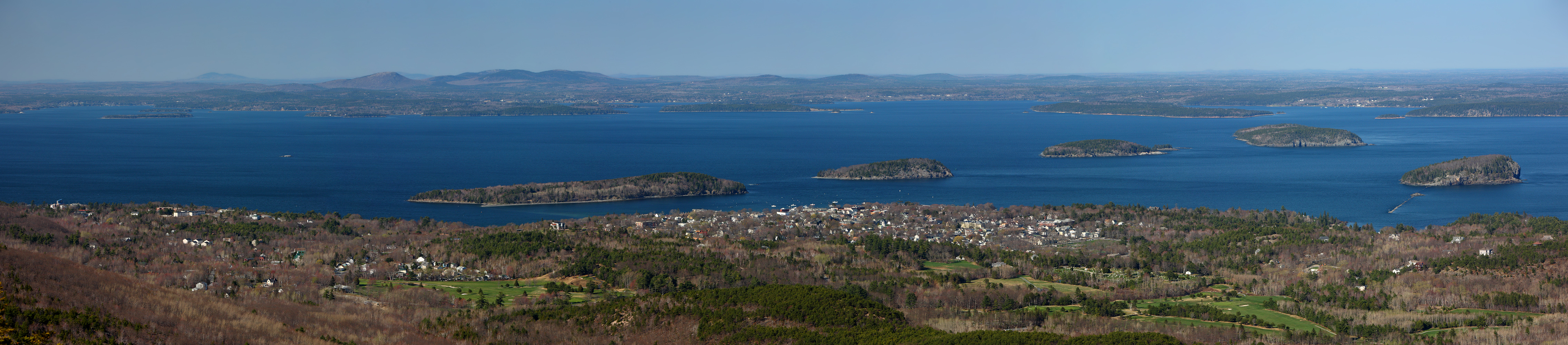
Frenchman Bay and Bar Harbor from Cadillac Mountain

== See also ==
- Park Loop Road
