= Mooning =

Display of the buttocks

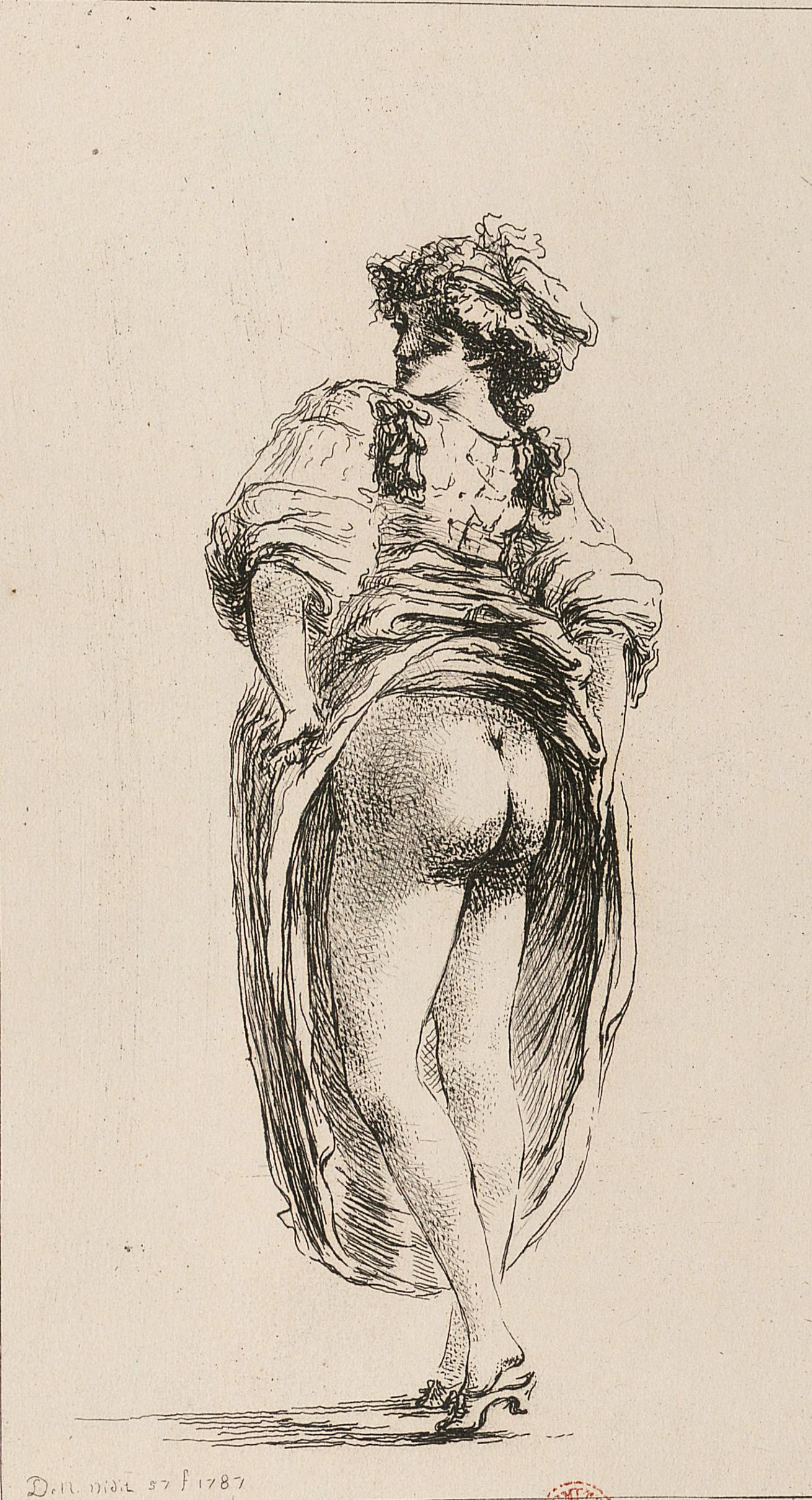
Beautiful Neapolitan woman seen from behind. Engraving from Dominique Vivant Denon's Oeuvre Priapique. 1787

Mooning is the act of displaying one's bare buttocks by removing clothing, e.g., by lowering the backside of one's trousers and underpants, usually bending over, and also potentially exposing the anus and genitals. Mooning is used in the English-speaking world to express protest, scorn, disrespect, or for provocation, but mooning can be done for shock value, for fun, as a joke or as a form of exhibitionism. The Māori have a form of mooning known as whakapohane that is a form of insult.

Some jurisdictions regard mooning to be indecent exposure, sometimes depending on the context.

== Word history ==
Moon has been a common shape metaphor for the buttocks in English since 1743, and the verb to moon has meant "to expose to (moon)light" since 1601. As documented by McLaren, "'mooning', or exposing one's butt to shame an enemy [...] had a long pedigree in peasant culture" throughout the Middle Ages, and in many nations.

Although the practice of mooning was widespread by the 19th century, the Oxford English Dictionary dates the use of "moon" and "mooning" to describe the act to student slang of the 1960s, when the gesture became increasingly popular among students at universities in the United States.

== In various countries and cultures ==
=== Australia ===
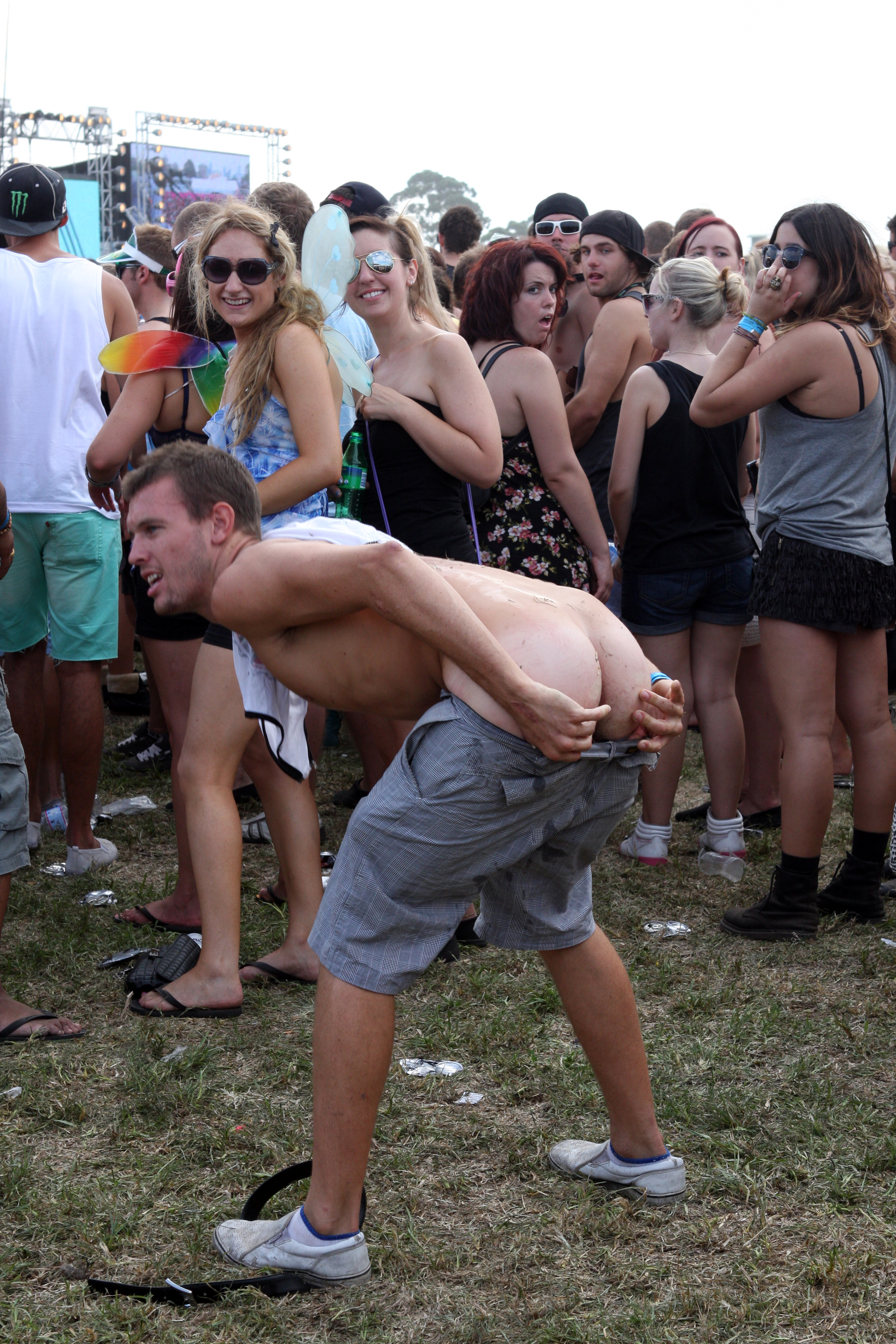
Australian demonstrating the act in Sydney, 2011

In Australian idiom, "chuck a browneye" is synonymous with the act of mooning.

==== Victoria ====
In January 2016, mooning in a public place in Victoria was made a criminal offence.

==== Northern Territory ====
A group of locals, called "Noonamah Moonies", mooned the Ghan at Livingstone Airstrip in 2004 and 2024. The next exhibition can be expected in 2034, with the mooning happening every 10 years.

=== Latvia ===
In Latvian legends, two maidens went naked from the sauna with carrying poles to the well. While collecting water, one of the women noted how beautiful the Moon is. The other was unimpressed, remarking that her own bottom was prettier and proceeded to moon the Moon. As a punishment, either Dievs or Mēness (a lunar deity) put the woman along with a carrying pole on the Moon, so that her bottom was put perpetually on display to everyone.

=== New Zealand ===
Whakapohane is the Māori practice of baring one's buttocks with the intent to offend. It symbolises the birthing act and renders the recipient noa ("base").

=== United States ===
==== Maryland ====
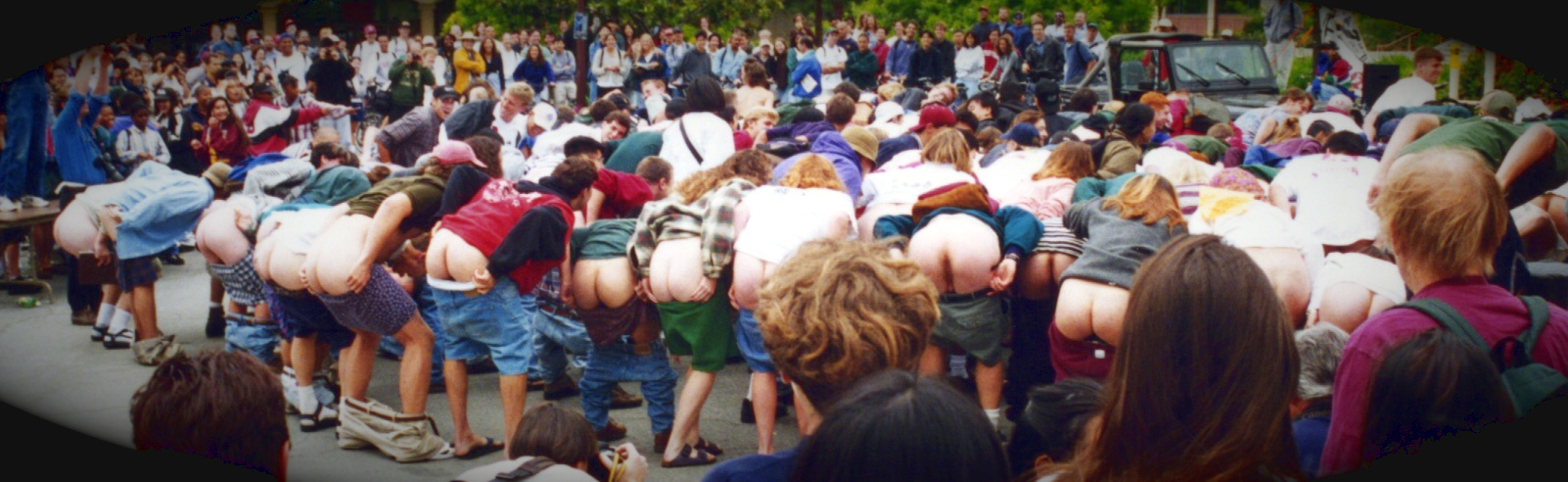
Students at Stanford University conduct a "mass mooning" in May 1995. This demonstration was in protest of censorship in the American media.

In January 2006, a Maryland state circuit court determined that mooning is a form of artistic expression protected by the First Amendment as a form of speech.

The court ruled that indecent exposure relates only to exposure of the genitals, adding that even though mooning was a "disgusting" and "demeaning" act to engage in, and had taken place in the presence of a minor, "If exposure of half of the buttocks constituted indecent exposure, any woman wearing a thong at the beach at Ocean City would be guilty."

Defense attorneys had cited a case from 1983 of a woman who was arrested after protesting in front of the U.S. Supreme Court building wearing nothing but a cardboard sign that covered the front of her body. In that case, the District of Columbia Court of Appeals had ruled that indecent exposure is limited to a person's genitalia. No review of the case by a higher court took place since prosecutors dropped the case after the ruling.

==== California ====
In December 2000, in California, the California Court of Appeal found that mooning does not constitute indecent exposure (and therefore does not subject the defendant to sex offender registration laws), unless it can be proven beyond reasonable doubt that the conduct was sexually motivated.

=== United Kingdom ===
The idiom "to pull a moonie" is commonly used to describe the activity.

== Notable incidents ==
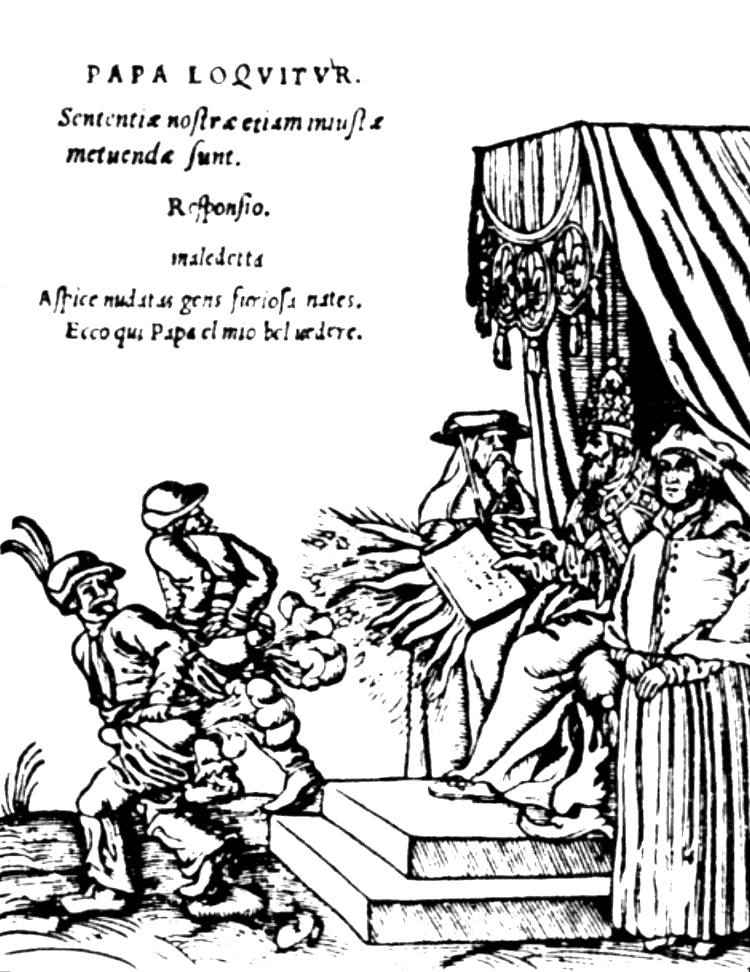
The Papal Belvedere by Lucas Cranach the Elder in the 1545 publication of Martin Luther's Depiction of the Papacy: German peasants respond to a papal bill of Pope Paul III. Caption reads: "The Pope speaks: Our sentences are to be feared, even if unjust. Response: Be damned! Behold, o furious race, our bared buttocks. Here, Pope, is my 'belvedere'"

- In 80 AD, Flavius Josephus recorded the first known incident of mooning. Josephus recorded that in the procuratorship of Ventidius Cumanus (48-52 AD), at around the beginning of the First Roman–Jewish War, a soldier in the Roman army mooned Jewish pilgrims at the Jewish Temple in Jerusalem who had gathered for Passover, and "spake such words as you might expect upon such a posture" causing a riot in which youths threw stones at the soldiers, who then called in reinforcements—the pilgrims panicked, and the ensuing stampede resulted in the death of ten thousand Jews.
- In the Siege of Constantinople in 1204, the Greeks exposed their bare buttocks to the Crusaders after they repulsed them from the walls.
- At the Siege of Nice, in the summer of 1543, Catherine Ségurane, a common washerwoman, led the townspeople into battle. Legend has it that she took the lead in defending the city by standing before the invading forces and exposing her bare bottom.
- At the Conference of Badajoz–Elvas of 1524, where Portugal and Spain discussed the location of the meridian that divided their respective hemispheres, a young boy one day asked the delegates if they were trying to divide the world. The adults answered they were. The boy then responded by baring his backside and suggesting that they draw their line through his intergluteal cleft.
- A number of early explorers of the Atlantic coastline noted that the Etchemin tribe of Maine practiced this custom.
- Since 1979, The Annual Mooning of Amtrak has been an annual tradition in Laguna Niguel, California on the second Saturday of July, where many people spend the day mooning passing Amtrak trains; some passengers ride the trains that day to witness the event. This has inspired a chain of "train moonings" throughout the country.
- An example of whakapohane was performed by Dun Mihaka to Diana, Princess of Wales and Prince Charles during the royal tour of 1983 of New Zealand.
- In 1986, a Maori man mooned the motorcade of Queen Elizabeth and Prince Philip in Napier, New Zealand, as a protest over the 1840 Treaty of Waitangi.
- On November 22, 1987, an intruder interrupted the broadcast signal of Chicago PBS affiliate, WTTW with a strange video of himself dressed to resemble Max Headroom. He exposed his buttocks to the camera.
- A tradition of Appalachian Trail thru-hikers, Mooning the Cog has developed on Mount Washington in New Hampshire.
- In June 2000, a mass mooning event was organised outside of Buckingham Palace in the United Kingdom by the Movement Against the Monarchy (MAM). A large police presence prevented a large-scale mooning, but a few individuals did so. This event is known as the Moon Against the Monarchy.
- On 7 June 2002, Macy Gray mooned the crowd during her performance at the Manchester Apollo concert in Ardwick Green, Manchester, England.
- On January 9, 2005, Randy Moss of the Minnesota Vikings mimed pulling down his trousers and bent over toward Green Bay Packers fans following a touchdown he scored. NFL on Fox announcer Joe Buck called it a “disgusting act”. The simulated moon was a response to Packers fans, who traditionally moon the Vikings players aboard the team bus. Moss was fined $10,000 by the NFL for the incident.
- At the 2005 UK Music Hall of Fame awards ceremony, musician Ozzy Osbourne mooned the crowd after a set he played.
- In October 2006, English Premiership footballer Joey Barton was fined £2,000 for mooning Everton fans.
- At the Patch Adams Full Moon Festival three-day event to raise money for his Gesundheit! Institute and Albuquerque, 200,000 people pay $100 each to moon as a group and lend a hand with local projects.
- On 10 May 2007, Yvette Fielding mooned photographers from inside a Soho restaurant window on the final episode of the reality television series Deadline.
- On 24 October 2011, economic inequality protester Liam Warriner of Sydney ran alongside the motorcade of Queen Elizabeth II and a waving Prince Philip for 50 metres with an Australian flag clenched between his exposed buttocks, before being arrested by police.
- On 13 May 2017, during an interval act at the Eurovision Song Contest 2017, a man wrapped in an Australian flag snuck on stage and mooned the audience. It was later reported that the man was Ukrainian journalist and prankster Vitalii Sediuk.
- In January 2023, 79-year-old Australian music personality Molly Meldrum climbed onstage at an Elton John concert and mooned the audience. The incident garnered significant media attention.
- In January 2026, an ICE agent mooned a crowd of protesters from a window at a Minneapolis hotel

== See also ==
- Anasyrma – Culturally framed gesture of lifting the skirt or kilt
- Indecent exposure – Public indecency involving nudity
- Pantsing – Act of pulling down a person's trousers
- Streaking – Running naked through a public place
- Upskirt – Image taken under a person's skirt
