= Mooning the Cog =

Mount Washington tradition

Mooning the Cog is a tradition in which hikers bare their buttocks to the trains of the Cog Railway on Mount Washington, the highest peak in New Hampshire.

== Description ==
A hiker on the West Side Trail watches the Mount Washington Cog Railway pass by, October 2016.

Mooning of the Mount Washington Cog Railway trains is most commonly done by thru-hikers, as they pass by on the Appalachian Trail.

It is a tradition, believed to date to at least 1987, in which, as the train passes the trail, some hikers choose to drop their drawers and "moon" the passengers. There are several theories as to the reasons for this tradition. One holds that it is an act of protest against the smoke, steam, and noise pollution generated by the railroad, which is known as the "Smog Railway" to some hikers. According to others, it is a reference to the train's original name, "The Railway to the Moon".

The practice, though longstanding, is considered offensive by some of the Cog Railway's passengers. An off-duty New Hampshire State Trooper and a Forest Ranger began riding the train and arresting hikers who mooned it. During the autumn of 2007, eight hikers were arrested and were to be charged in a federal court, as the act took place in a National Forest.
