= Quincy & Torch Lake Railroad =

Railroad in Michigan, US

Overview
- Headquarters: Hancock, Michigan
- Locale: Hancock, Michigan
- Dates of operation: 1890–1945
- Successor: None

Technical
- Track gauge: 3 ft (914 mm)
- Length: 15 miles

The Quincy & Torch Lake Railroad (Q&TL), an affiliate of the Quincy Mining Company, was a 3-foot-gauge shortline railroad located at Hancock in the Upper Peninsula of Michigan, not far from Torch Lake. It was created to replace an existing tramway, and was designed to take copper-bearing rock from the Quincy Mine downhill to a mill, and return coal uphill to power mine operations. The mainline was just 6.5 miles in length, while sidings and extensions added about 8 miles, for total trackage under 15 miles. Running until 1945, it was Michigan's Last Operating Narrow Gauge Railroad

== History ==
The line was chartered in July 1888, and construction started in April 1889. The narrow gauge was chosen because railroads in the area, namely the Hancock and Calumet Railroad as well as the Mineral Range Railroad, were narrow gauge at that time. The railway began operations in March of 1890. Its first engine was the "Thomas F. Mason," a 32-ton 2-6-0 Mogul built by the Brooks Locomotive Works of Dunkirk, New York.

In 1905 the Quincy Mining Company bought the locomotives and rolling stock from the Q&TL and began operating the line directly, although the Q&TL remained the nominal owner of the track. This continued until the Q&TL was officially liquidated in 1927, although the rail operation continued until the mine was shut down in 1931. The line was reactivated in 1937 as World War II-era demand for copper caused the mine to reopen. The mine and the railway were shut down permanently in 1945.

== Legacy ==
The Quincy Mine area is preserved as a cooperating site of the Keweenaw National Historical Park. Visitors are transported to and from the mine on the Quincy and Torch Lake Cog Railway. While that tramway is recent in origin, the tram bears the "Quincy and Torch Lake Railroad" name.

Locomotive #1, the Thomas F. Mason, has ended up in preservation at the Quincy Mine.

Locomotive #3, a 2-6-0 Mogul acquired from Brooks in 1892, is currently stored dismantled at the Crossroads Village & Huckleberry Railroad attraction in Genesee County, near Flint, Michigan.

Locomotive #6, the last engine purchased for the line, being a 2-8-0 Consolidation acquired in 1913, was sent to Pine Creek Railroad at Allaire State Park in New Jersey in 1975 with the intent for it to be returned to operational condition. This did not occur, and the locomotive was sent back to the Quincy Mine in 2009, where it is undergoing restoration work.
