= Sylvester Marsh =

American engineer (1803–1884)

- Born: September 30, 1803; Campton, New Hampshire, U.S.
- Died: December 30, 1884 (aged 81); Concord, New Hampshire, U.S.
- Occupations: Merchant, inventor
- Known for: Design of the Mount Washington Cog Railway
- Spouse(s): Charlotte Bates (m. 1844; died 1850) Cornelia Hoyt (m. 1855)
- Children: 11

Sylvester Marsh (September 30, 1803 – December 30, 1884) was an American merchant and inventor who designed and built the Mount Washington Cog Railway.

== Biography ==
Born in September 1803, Marsh grew up on a farm, which he worked on, and he attended the common school in the winter. At age 19, he left for Boston, where he worked as a farm hand, and in 1826 he established himself there as a provision dealer. In 1828, he was engaged in Ashtabula, Ohio, in supplying Boston and New York City with beef and pork. He settled in Chicago during the winter of 1833/4, and there followed a similar business until 1837, when his accumulations were swept away in the Panic of 1837. He began again in the grain business, and acquired a substantial fortune. Meanwhile, he worked for the advancement of Chicago.

Marsh invented many appliances that were incidental to meat packing, especially those having reference to the use of steam. He invented the dried-meal process, and “Marsh's caloric dried meal” was long an article of commerce.

In 1855, Marsh moved to Jamaica Plain, Massachusetts, and moved back to Chicago after five years. He resided a year in Brooklyn, New York, where he was an exporter, sending much of his dried meal product to the West Indies. In 1864, he settled in Littleton, New Hampshire, and after 1879 made Concord, New Hampshire, his residence.

In 1844, Marsh married Charlotte Bates, who died in 1850. In 1855, he married Cornelia Hoyt. Marsh died in December 1884, aged 81.

== Cog railway ==
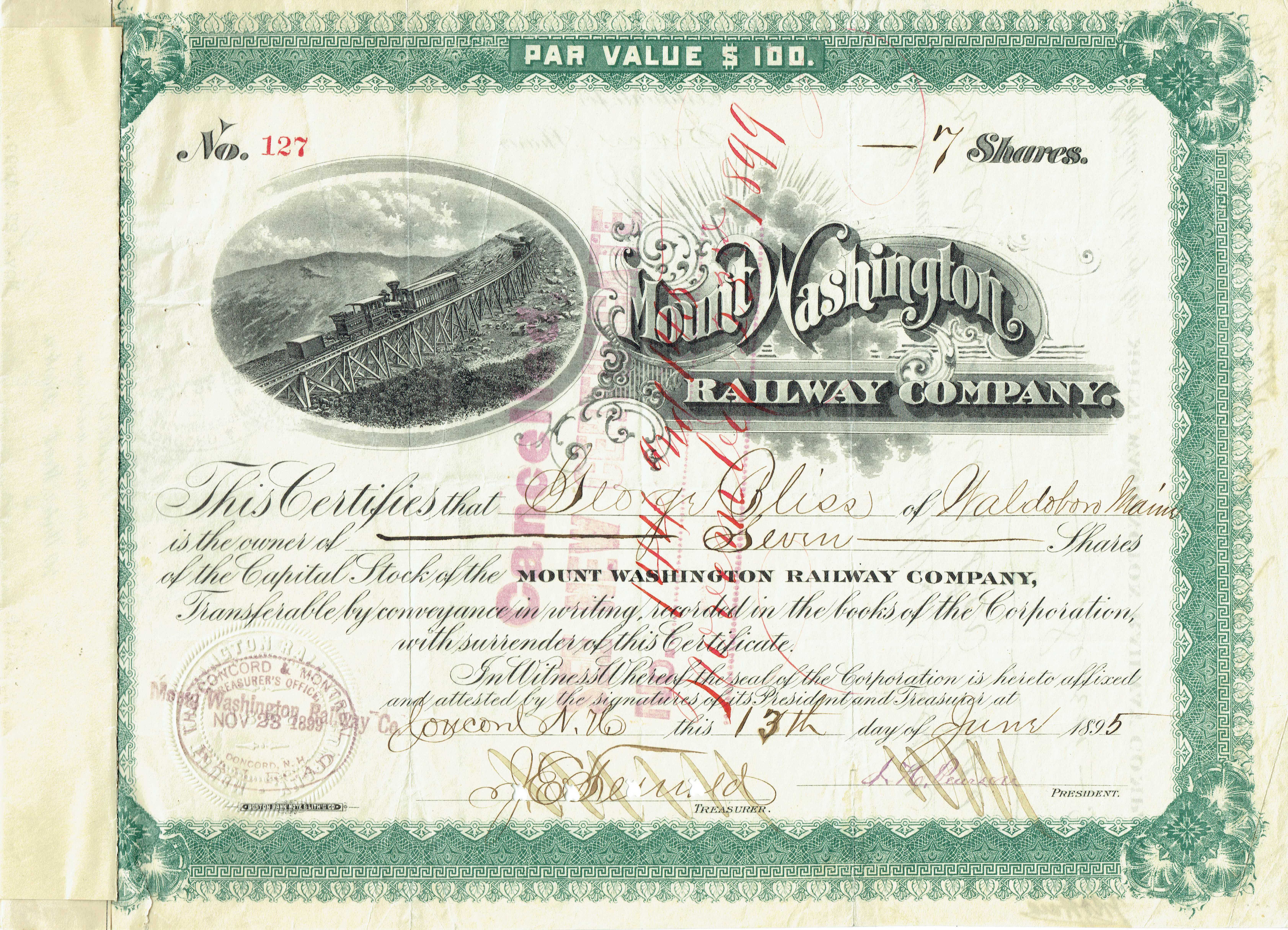
Share of the Mount Washington Railway Company, issued June 13, 1895

While ascending Mount Washington in 1852, Marsh lost his way, and then conceived the idea of building a railroad to its summit, believing that such an enterprise could be made profitable. He obtained a charter for the road on June 25, 1858, but the American Civil War prevented any action until May 1866. The construction of such a road was regarded as impossible, and he became known as “Crazy Marsh”; indeed, the legislature, in granting him a charter, further expressed their willingness to grant a “charter to the moon” if he wished.

Notwithstanding all opposition, Marsh persisted in building the railroad, relying chiefly on his own resources, and received little capital investment until an engine was actually running over part of the route. The peculiar form of locomotive, cog rail, and brakes used were invented by Marsh. The cog railway was formally opened on August 14, 1868, as far as “Jacob's ladder,” and entirely completed in July 1869. During the construction of this road, it was visited by a Swiss engineer, who took away drawings of the machinery and track, from which a similar railway, Rigi Railways, was built up Mount Rigi in Switzerland.

== Sources ==
- Rines, George Edwin, ed. (1920). "Marsh, Sylvester" . Encyclopedia Americana.
