= Green Mountain Cog Railway =

Railway in Maine

Overview
- Headquarters: Eagle Lake
- Locale: Maine
- Dates of operation: 1883–1890

Technical
- Track gauge: 4 ft 8 in (1,422 mm)
- Length: 1.1 miles (1.8 km)

The Green Mountain Cog Railway was a mountain railway built to carry tourists to the top of Green Mountain (now known as Cadillac Mountain) on Mount Desert Island in Maine. Its track was built to 4 ft 8 in (1,422 mm) gauge, which is technically a narrow gauge, as it is a 1/2-inch less than 4 ft 8 1/2 in (1,435 mm) standard gauge.

== History ==
At the end of the 19th century, Maine's tourist industry developed rapidly. The islands off the coast of Maine were popular attractions, and the possibility of a cog railway to the top of Green Mountain was first explored in the late 1870s following the success of the Mount Washington Cog Railway in New Hampshire. Construction of the railway started in 1883, and it was built to the designs in the Marsh patents developed for the Mount Washington line. The first locomotive was built by the Manchester Locomotive Works and was meant to be for the Mount Washington line. After the first season, Frank Clergue, "owner and operator", bought another coach and locomotive, both identical to their predecessors. The coaches and work cars were built by the Hinckley & Egery Iron Co. The coaches had eight benches, with open-air seating that could hold six. During bad weather, canvas tarps were rolled down from the ceiling to protect the passengers from the wind and rain. The #1 locomotive was named "Mount Desert", and #2 was not named. Both locomotives were used at the same time when there were large numbers of passengers. There were no switches on the railway, so the trains did not have the ability to pass each other.

The line operated during the summer season and was successful for the first few years. However, tourist numbers declined, and after the 1890 season, the railway ceased operations. The railway's two steam locomotives were sold to the Mount Washington Cog Railway in 1895 after five years of disuse.

== Locomotives ==
Number	Name	Image	Builder	Type	Date	Notes
1			Manchester Locomotive Works	Steam	1883	Became No. 4 Chocorua of the Mount Washington Cog Railway
2			Manchester Locomotive Works	Steam	1883	Became the Mount Washington Cog Railway No. 3 Agiocochook.

== See also ==
- Chicago Tunnel Company
- Manitou and Pike's Peak Railway
- Mount Washington Cog Railway
- Quincy and Torch Lake Cog Railway
