= Quincy and Torch Lake Cog Railway =

Cog railway in Michigan

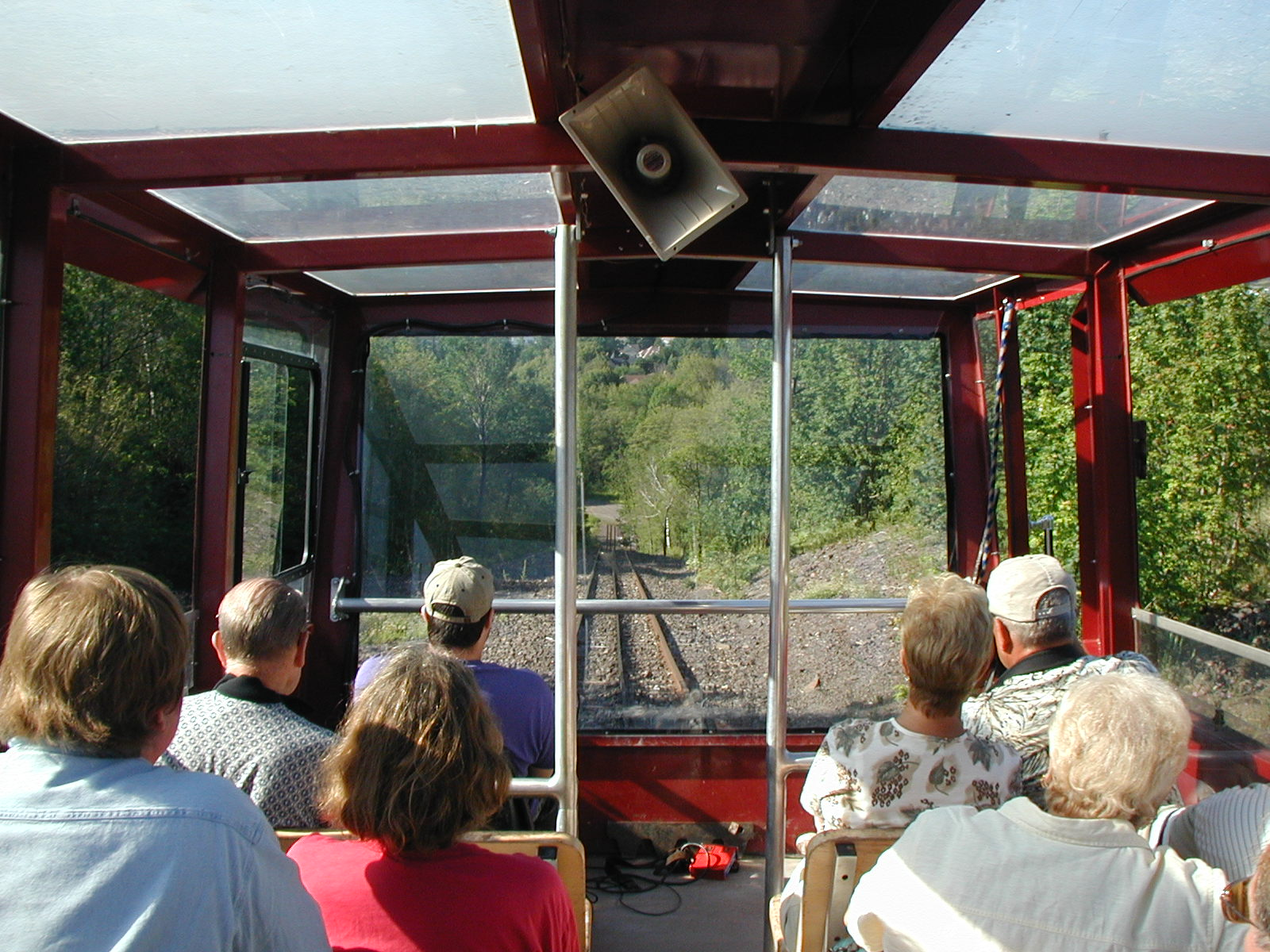
- The interior of the tram car

Overview
- Status: Operating
- Locale: Hancock, Michigan
- Website: quincymine.com

Service
- Type: Rack railway

History
- Opened: May 1997
- Predecessor: Quincy & Torch Lake Railroad

Technical
- Track length: 1/2 mile (0.80 km)
- Rack system: Strub
- Track gauge: 1,435 mm (4 ft 8 1/2 in) standard gauge
- Operating speed: 5 mph (8.0 km/h) to 10 mph (16 km/h)

The Quincy and Torch Lake Cog Railway is a 1/2-mile-long (0.80 km), 4 ft 8 1/2 in (1,435 mm) standard gauge cog railway in Hancock, Michigan. It opened in May 1997 to transport tourists to the adit entrance of the Quincy Mine's Number 5 shaft. Its tram car has a capacity of 28 people and travels at a maximum grade of 35%. It is one of only three rack railways in the United States.

== History ==
=== Mining era ===
Prior to the creation of the current tourist tramway, there existed a tramway used by the Quincy Mine to transport ore down the hill to the Quincy Smelter. It consisted of two tracks with tramcars in counterbalance. It was 2,200 feet (670 m) long with a 500-foot (150 m) vertical drop. In 1890 the tramway was replaced by the Quincy & Torch Lake Railroad.

=== Modern era ===
Before the current tram was added, tourists were transported to the adit entrance by van, an indirect and cumbersome method. The solution of a tram was suggested by the vice president of the Quincy Mine Hoist Association, James R. Vivian Sr. The U.S. Economic Development Administration provided $420,000 in funds with a matching $200,000 raised by the Hoist Association. Construction began on April 12, 1996, and was completed on November 11, 1996. The tramway opened for use in May 1997.

The tramcar, designed by Phil Quenzi, was built by Royale Construction Inc. of Kearsarge, Michigan and the grading and tracking laying was carried out by MJO Construction of Hancock, Michigan. The project engineer was Robert D. Hitch, P.E. and the project manager was James R. Vivian Jr.

In the winter of 2009, the tram underwent a refurbishment, including new paint, new windows, and refurbished seats.

== Details ==
The 165-horsepower (123 kW) diesel tramcar is 35 feet (10.67 m) long, and 8 feet 6.75 inches (2.61 m) wide. It has a passenger capacity of 28 with a top speed of 10 mph (16 km/h) on shallow grades. It is made of red-painted steel, and has large windows on the sides and roof.

== See also ==
- Chicago Tunnel Company
- Green Mountain Cog Railway
- List of rack railways
- Manitou and Pike's Peak Railway
- Mount Washington Cog Railway
