= Mount Washington Cog Railway =

Mountain-climbing cog railway in New Hampshire, United States

Coordinates: 44°16′26″N 71°19′55″W

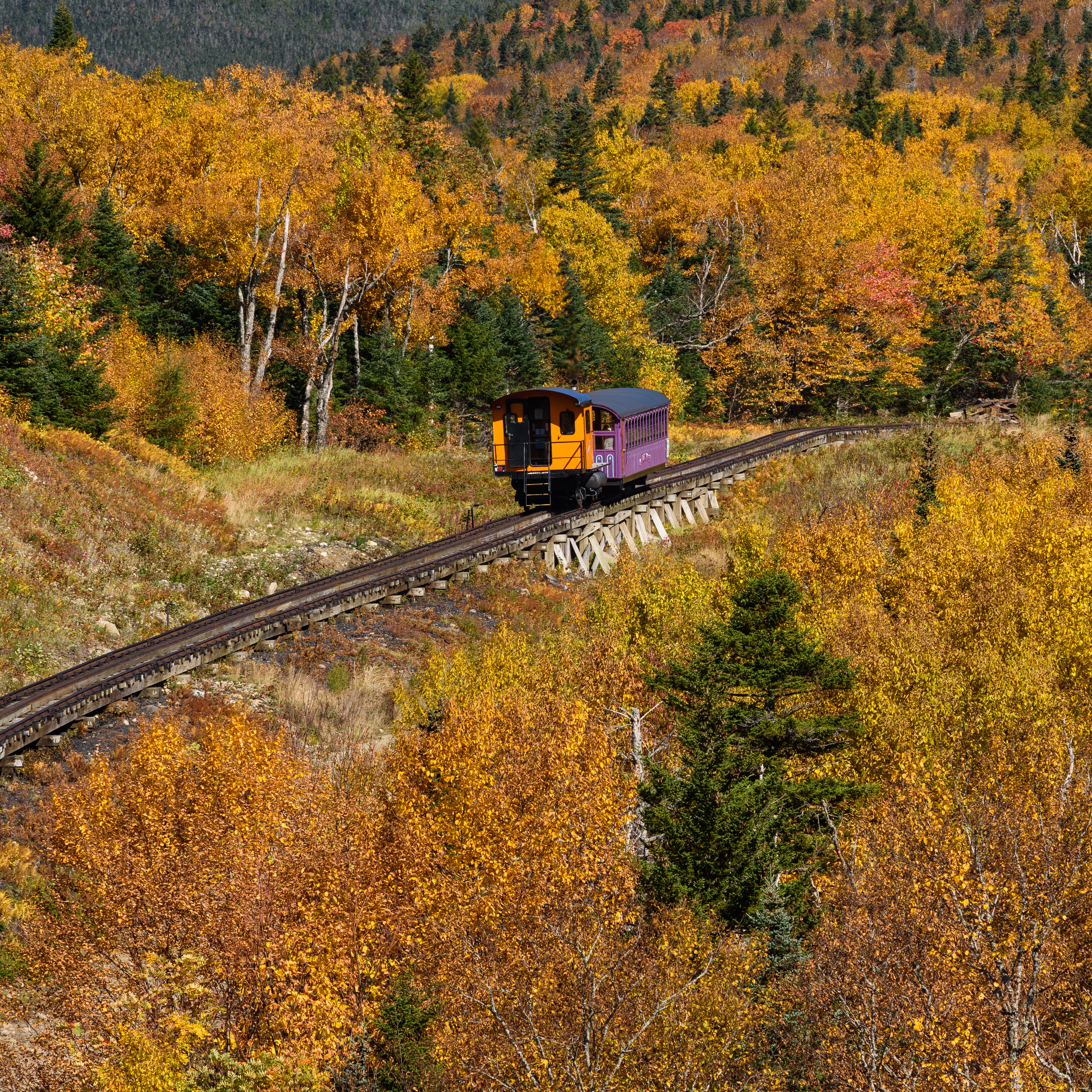
- Train M-7 Kenison ascending the railway

Overview
- Locale: Coos County, New Hampshire, U.S.
- Website: thecog.com

History
- Work began: May 1866
- Opened: August 1868
- Completed: July 3, 1869; 157 years ago

Technical
- Line length: 3 miles (4.8 km)
- Rack system: Marsh rack system
- Track gauge: 4 ft 8 in (1,422 mm)
- Operating speed: Ascend: 2.8 mph (4.5 km/h); Descend: 4.6 mph (7.4 km/h)
- Highest elevation: 6,288 ft (1,917 m) (approx.)
- Founder: Sylvester Marsh
- Key people: Wayne Presby, President

The Mount Washington Cog Railway, also known as the Cog, is the world's first mountain-climbing cog railway (rack-and-pinion railway). The railway climbs Mount Washington in New Hampshire, United States. It uses a Marsh rack system and both steam and biodiesel-powered locomotives to carry tourists to the top of the mountain. Its track is built to a 4 ft 8 in (1,422 mm) gauge, which is technically a narrow gauge, as it is 1/2 inch (13 mm) less than a 4 ft 8 1/2 in (1,435 mm) standard gauge.

It is the second-steepest rack railway in the world, after the Pilatus Railway in Switzerland, with an average grade of over 25% and a maximum grade of 37%. The railway is approximately 3 miles (5 km) long and ascends Mount Washington's western slope, beginning at an elevation of approximately 2,700 feet (820 m) above sea level and ending just short of the mountain's summit peak of 6,288 feet (1,917 m). The train ascends the mountain at 2.8 miles per hour (4.5 km/h) and descends at 4.6 mph (7.4 km/h). Steam locomotives take approximately 65 minutes to ascend and 40 minutes to descend, while the biodiesel engines can go up in as little as 36 minutes.

Most of the Mount Washington Cog Railway is in Thompson and Meserve's Purchase, with the part of the railway nearest to Mount Washington's summit being in Sargent's Purchase.

== History ==
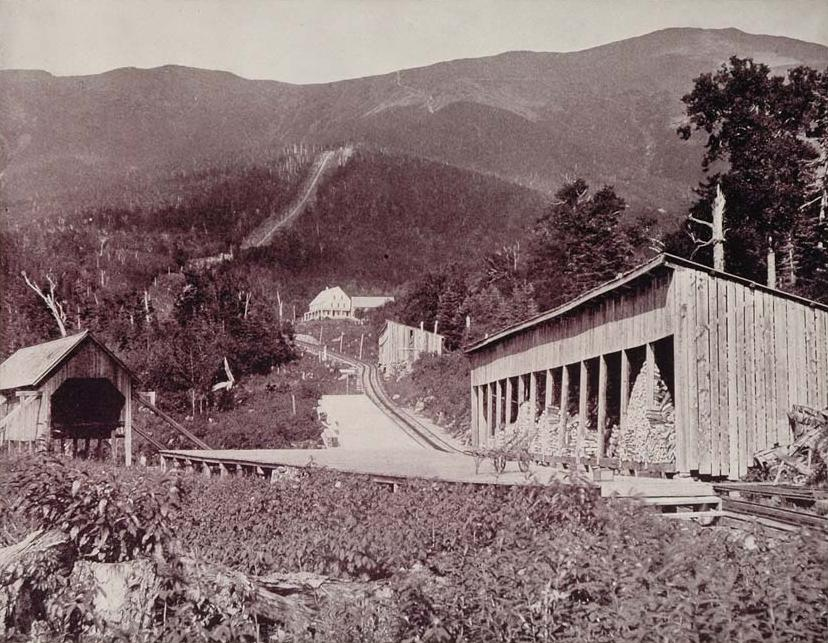
Track to the summit in 1893

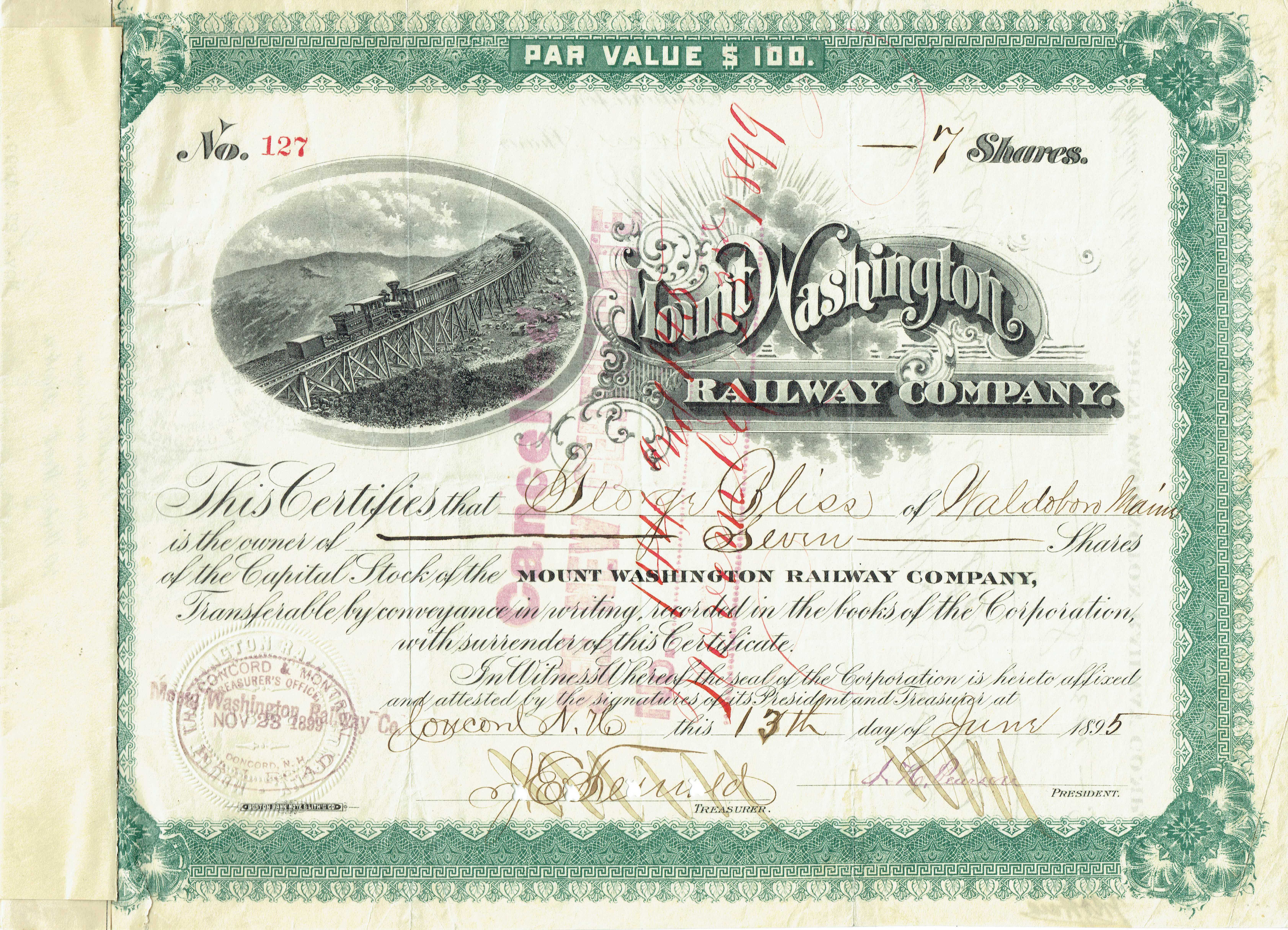
Share of the Mount Washington Railway Company, issued June 13, 1895

The railway was built by Sylvester Marsh who grew up in Campton. Marsh came up with the idea while climbing the mountain in 1852. His plan was treated as insane. Local tradition says that the state legislature voted permission based on a consensus that harm resulting from operating it was no issue – since the design was attempting the impossible – but benefits were guaranteed. He was putting up $5,000 of his own money, and that, plus whatever else he could raise, would be spent locally, including building the Fabyan House hotel at nearby Fabyan Station to accommodate the expected tourists. The railway is sometimes called "Railway to the Moon", because one state legislator remarked during the proceedings that Marsh should be given a charter, not merely up Mount Washington, but also to the moon.

Marsh obtained a charter for the road on June 25, 1858, but the American Civil War prevented any action until May 1866. He developed a prototype locomotive and a short demonstration section of track, then found investors, forming the Mount Washington Railway Company in the spring of 1866, and started construction. The route closely followed a mountain trail that had been established earlier in the century by Ethan Allen Crawford.

Despite the railroad's incomplete state, the first paying customers started riding on August 14, 1868, and the construction reached the summit in July 1869. The early locomotives – represented today by the restored display locomotive, #1 Old Peppersass – all had vertical boilers, like many stationary steam engines of the time; the boilers were mounted to the locomotives' frames with twin trunnions, allowing them to pivot as the locomotive and coach climbed the grade, permitting gravity to always keep the boiler vertically oriented, no matter what the gradient of the track. Later designs introduced horizontal boilers, slanted so that they remain close to horizontal on the steeply graded track.

In August 1869, President Ulysses S. Grant visited New England to escape the heat of summer in Washington, D.C. During his tour he rode the cog railway to the top of Mount Washington.

=== Running the railway ===
The Cog has been in continuous operation since 1869, with service interruptions only during the World Wars.

After Marsh died in 1884, control of the Cog passed to the Concord & Montreal Railroad, which ran it until 1889 when the Boston & Maine Railroad took over. From 1868 to 1910, the locomotives were fired with wood. In 1910, the railway converted to using coal for all its locomotives.

Henry N. Teague, a hotel executive, bought the Cog in 1931. Known as Col. Teague, an honorary title, he died in October 1951. Operational control passed to Arthur S. Teague, who had become vice president and general manager of the railway prior to his service in World War II, while ownership passed to Dartmouth College, Henry N. Teague's alma mater. The younger Teague, who actually was a colonel and was highly decorated during his military service, was a protégé of the elder Teague, but the two were not related. Arthur S. Teague bought the railway from Dartmouth in 1962. After he died in 1967, ownership of the railway passed to his wife, Ellen Crawford Teague, who ran the Cog as the world's first woman president of a railway. (Note: Mary Edna Hill Gray Dow became president of the horsecar railroad in Dover, New Hampshire, in 1888.) In 1983, Mrs. Teague sold the railway to a group of New Hampshire businessmen.

From 1986 to 2017, the Cog Railway was controlled and owned by Wayne Presby and Joel Bedor of Littleton, New Hampshire. The Bedor and Presby families also owned the Mount Washington Hotel and Resort in Bretton Woods for the period 1991–2006. In 1995, the railway appointed Charles Kenison as general manager. These individuals were responsible for a complete revitalization of the railroad, with the assistance of Al LaPrade, a mechanical engineer whose career began at the Portsmouth Naval Shipyard.

In the summer of 2008, the Cog introduced its first diesel locomotive. The Great Recession and the 2000s energy crisis led to fewer passengers, and the Cog sought to cut costs with the diesel, which could make three round trips for the cost of one steam train round trip.

In December 2016, the owner of the Cog proposed building a 35-room hotel along the line, about one mile (1.6 km) below the summit and two miles (3.2 km) above the station, to be opened in 2019 for the 150th anniversary of the train. However, the proposal drew opposition due to its location in the alpine zone of the mountain and was shelved.

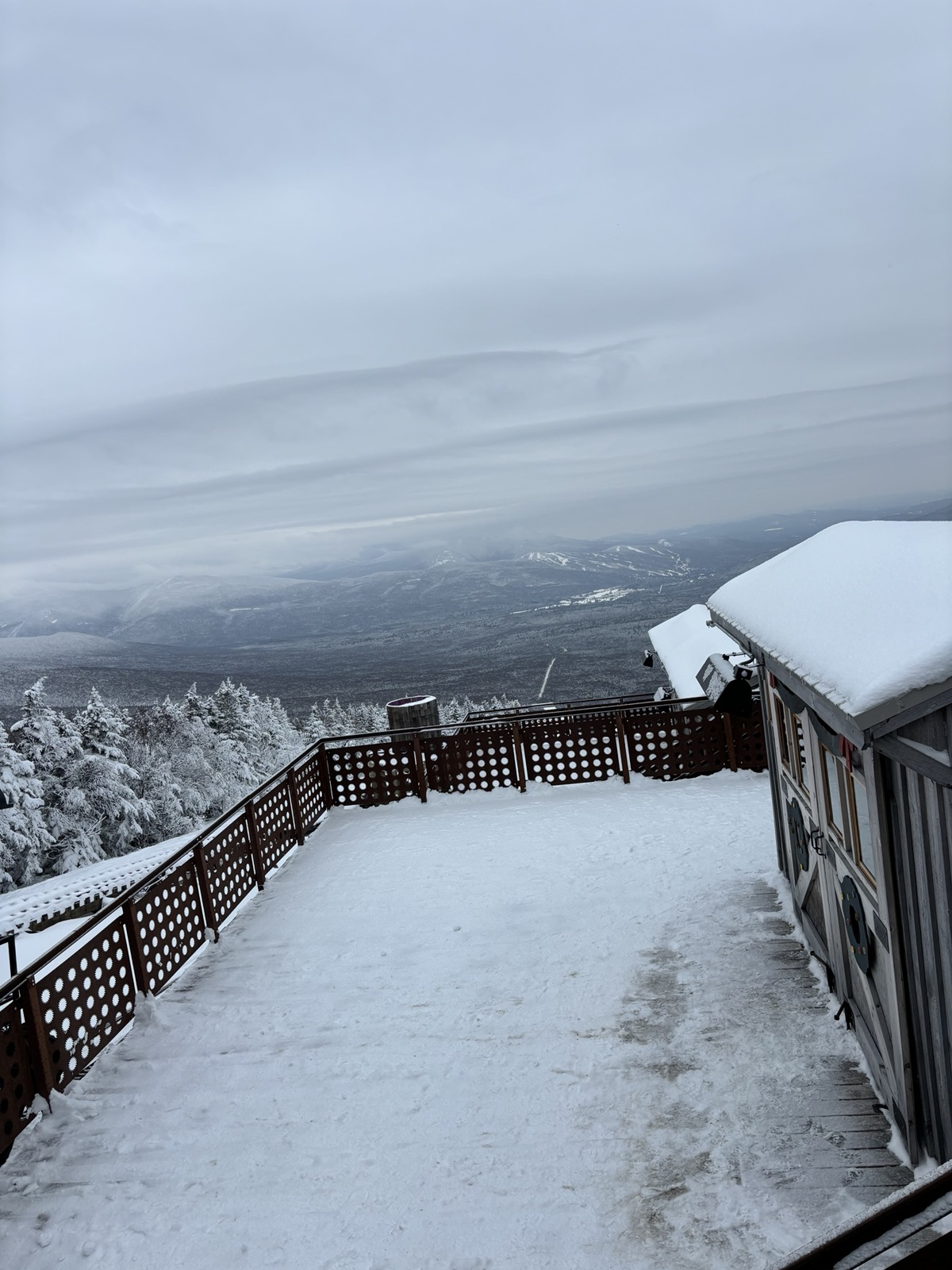
From November through early May, the Mt. Washington Cog Railway does not run to the summit. Instead, the winter destination is Waumbek Station.

In April 2017, the Bedor family sold its interest in the railway to Wayne Presby, the only remaining member of the original group, which had purchased the railway in 1983. Presby assumed direct management control of the railway in December 2017. In 2021, the railway completed two of the largest improvement projects in its history. The existing 25 lb/yd (12.4 kg/m) rail was replaced with 100 lb/yd (49.6 kg/m) rail and a new 34,000 sq ft (3,159 m^{2}) maintenance facility was completed. The new facility enabled the railway to resume winter operations in 2020. During the winter, the railway operates its trains to Waumbek Station at an elevation of approximately 3,800 feet (1,158 m).

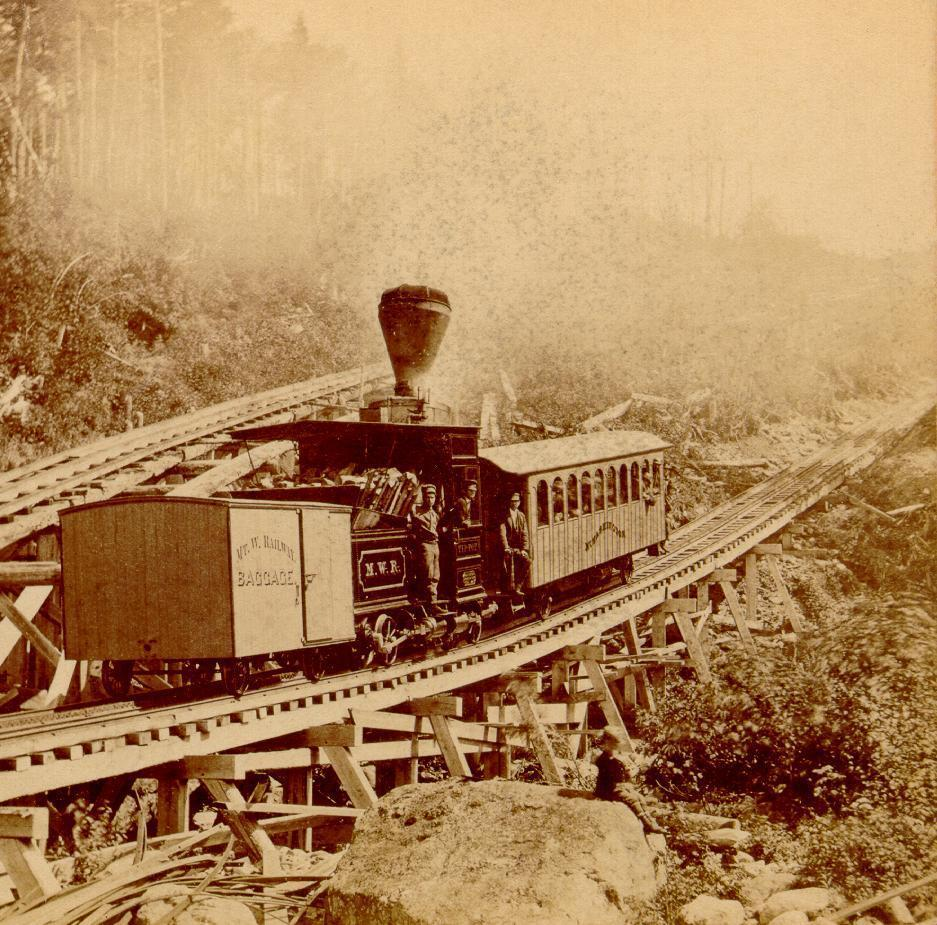
Leaving the depot c. 1880s

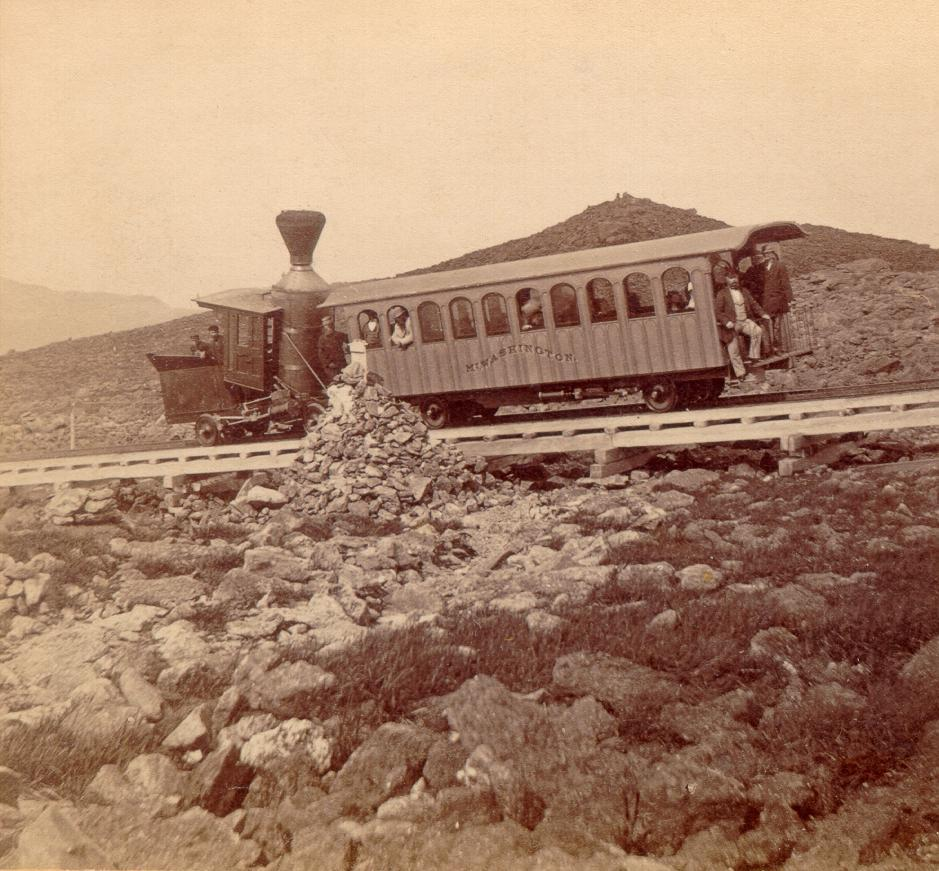
Partway up the mountain

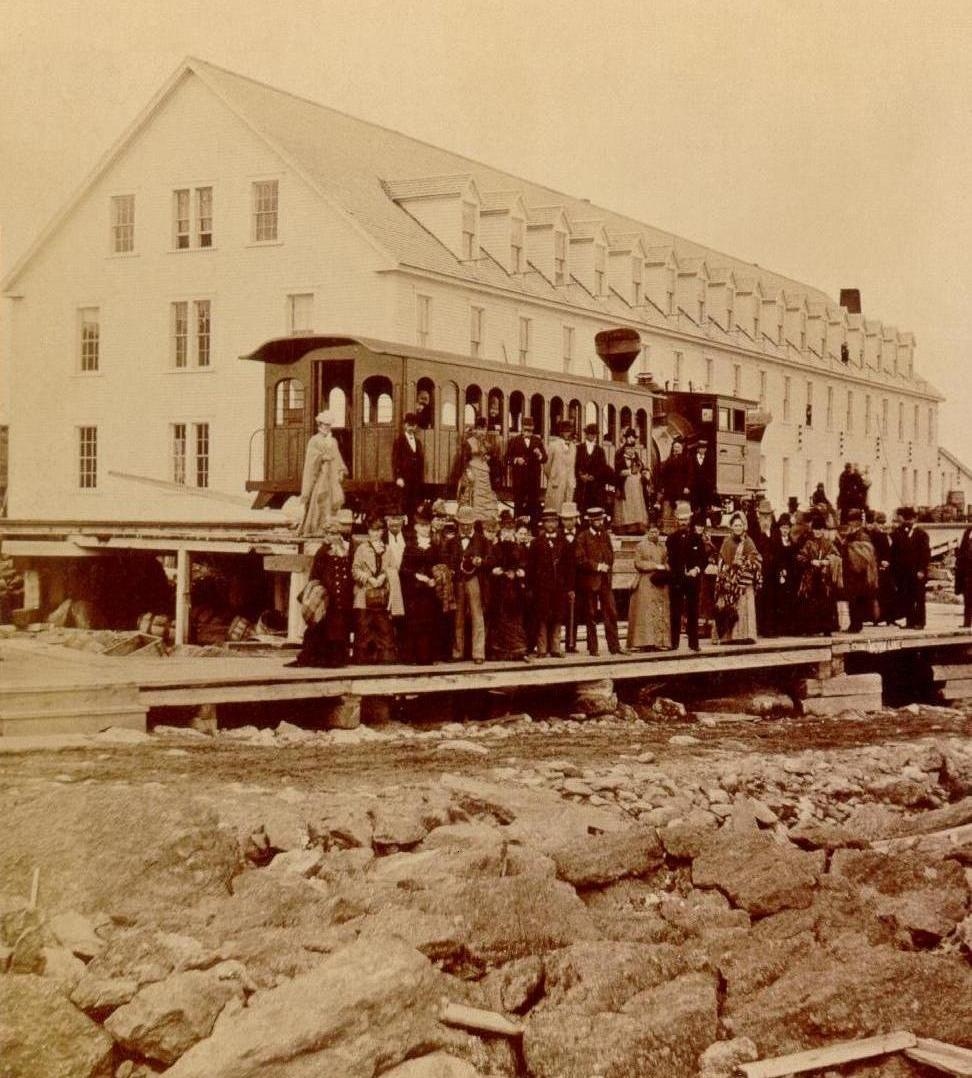
Arrival on the summit

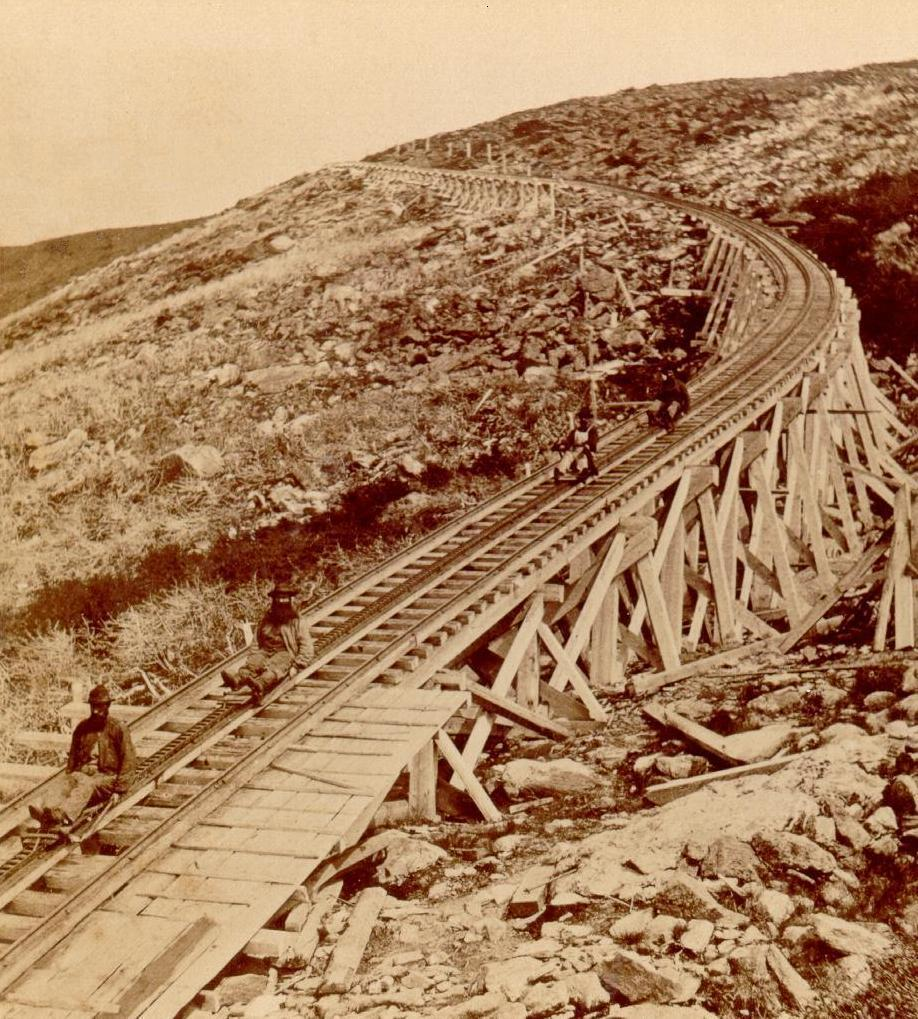
"Devil's shingles" down

=== "Devil's shingle" slideboards ===
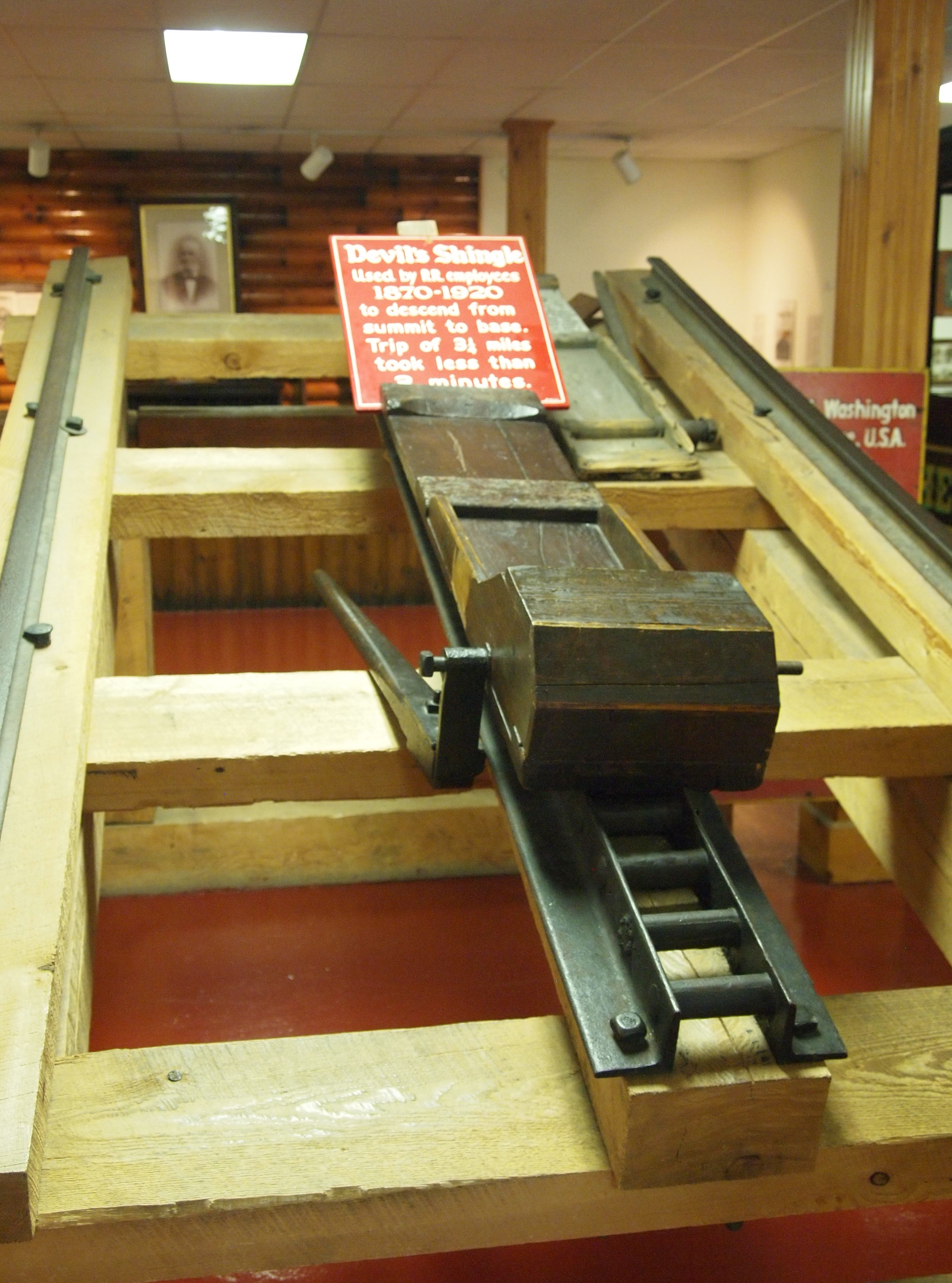
"Devil's shingle" slideboard

In the early days of the railway's construction, the workers wanted to minimize time when climbing and descending the ramp, so they invented slideboards fitting over the cog rack and providing enough room for themselves and their tools. These boards – no two were exactly alike – were approximately 35 in (90 cm) long by 9.8 in (25 cm) wide, made of wood with hand-forged iron and with two long, hardwood handles usually attached at the down-mountain end. The average time for the descent of the mountain using these boards was about 15 minutes. The record was 2:45, an average speed above 62 mph (100 km/h).

The "Devil's shingles" were banned in 1908 after the accidental death of an employee. However, that did not stop workers, and there are sources claiming the shingles were used by some up until the 1920s. Later, the design of the rack was changed so that the old braking mechanism could no longer grip.

=== Accidents ===
The railway has taken more than five million people to the summit during its existence. There have been two incidents resulting in fatalities, noted below.

The first major accident occurred on July 20, 1929, involving locomotive no. 1, known as Old Peppersass. This locomotive was used to build the railway, and operated until retirement in 1878. After a few years on display locally, it was shipped to the World's Columbian Exposition in 1893. The Baltimore and Ohio Railroad (B&O) took possession of the locomotive after the Exposition, and stored it in Baltimore until the 1927 Fair of the Iron Horse celebrating the B&O's 100th birthday. The Boston & Maine Railroad restored Old Peppersass at its Concord shops following the Fair to make a commemorative trip for the railway's 60th anniversary. After ascending to Jacob's Ladder, the locomotive began a planned descent but jumped up and landed to the right of the cog rail when a tooth broke from a gear wheel. The friction brake was unable to prevent the locomotive from accelerating downhill. The crew jumped to safety (though some suffered broken bones), but a photographer riding the engine to take publicity photos, Daniel P. Rossiter, fell to his death as the engine plunged off the trestle. The locomotive broke into pieces, but the boiler did not rupture, and the pieces were later reassembled to reconstruct the locomotive for static display. It is now located at the railway's base station.

On September 17, 1967, eight passengers were killed and 72 injured when locomotive no. 3 derailed at the Skyline switch, about a mile below the summit. The engine rolled off the trestle while the uncoupled passenger car slid several hundred feet into a large rock. An investigation revealed that the Skyline switch had not been properly configured for the descending train. A brakeman now watches for safety hazards from the leading end platform of the passenger car.

A non-fatal incident on August 10, 1946, injured 22 people. A flatcar, initially at rest near the summit, sped 600 feet (180 m) down the track and collided with an ascending passenger train carrying 24 people.

== Mechanical design ==
The cog railway designs and builds all of its locomotives and passenger coaches at the company shops located at the base of Mount Washington.

Each train consists of a locomotive pushing a single passenger car up the mountain, descending the mountain by going in reverse. Both locomotive and car were originally equipped with a ratchet and pawl mechanism engaged during the climb that prevents any roll-back; during descent, both locomotive and car are braked. Design improvements have replaced the ratchet (gear and pawl mechanism) with sprag clutches and disc brake assemblies. Most of the locomotives were made by the Manchester Locomotive Works.

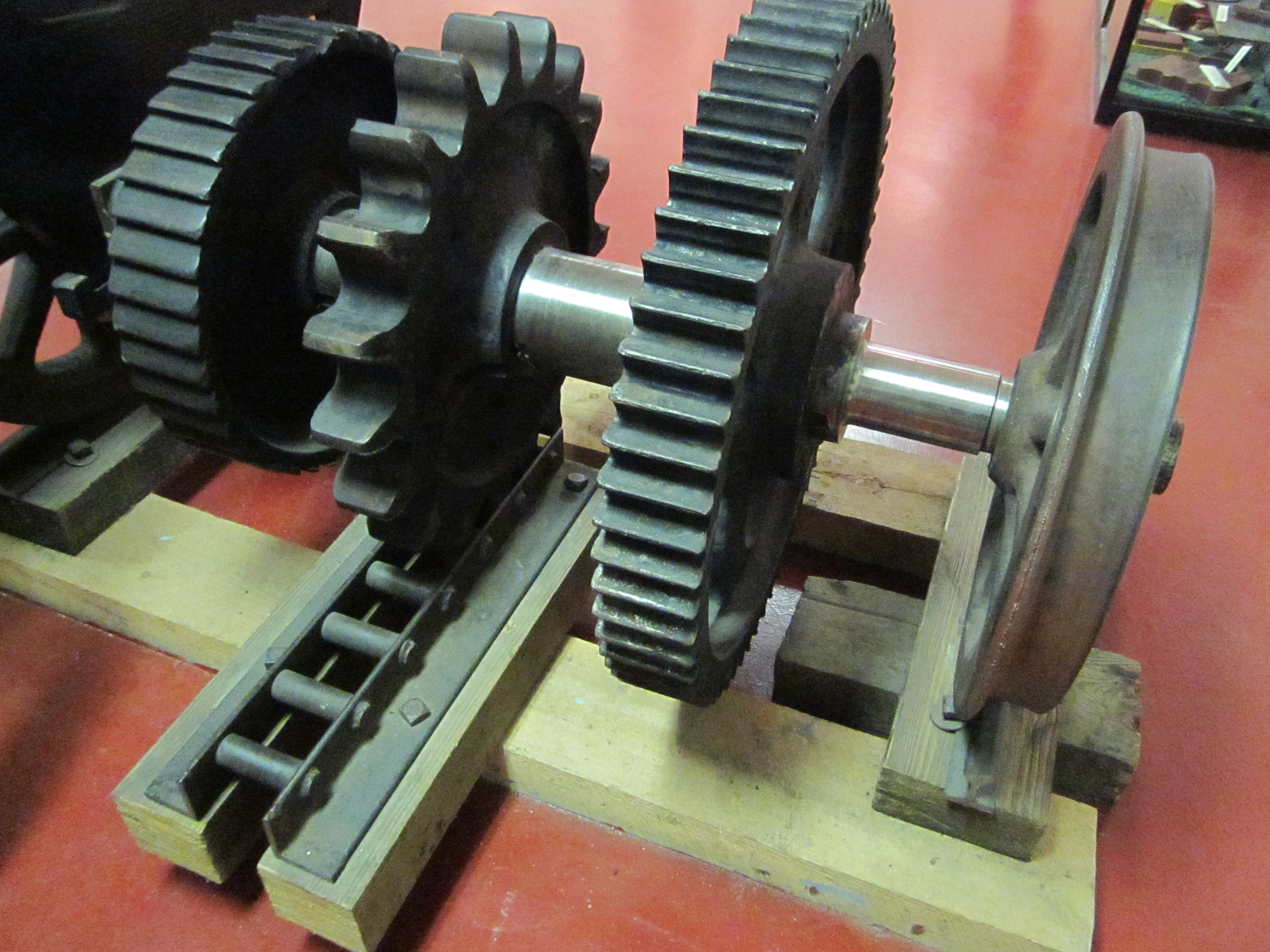
The cog, or rack and pinion, system that allows the locomotive to climb Mount Washington. Located in the museum.

The rack rail design used is one of Marsh's own inventions, using a ladder-like rack with open bar rungs engaged by the teeth of the cog wheel. This system allows snow and debris to fall through the rack, rather than lodging in it. A similar design, called the Riggenbach rack system, was invented by Niklaus Riggenbach in Switzerland at about the same time. The Swiss Consul to the United States visited Marsh while constructing the railway up Mount Washington, and his enthusiastic reports persuaded the Swiss government to commission Riggenbach to build the Vitznau-Rigi-Bahn on Mount Rigi, which opened on May 21, 1871.

Initially, there was no way for two trains to pass one another on the Mount Washington Cog Railway. In 1941, a nine-motion switch was invented, and two spur sidings were added, each long enough to divert two descending trains so that climbing trains could continue to the summit, enabling more round trips per day.

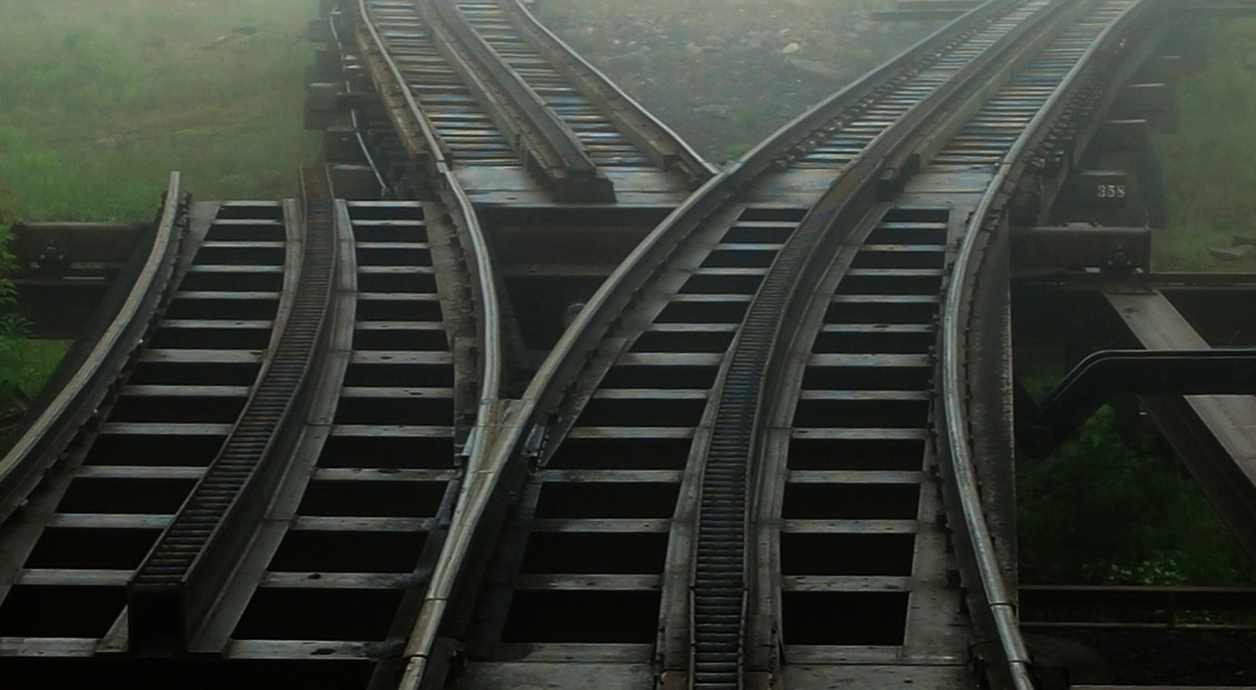
A switch (transfer table) of Mount Washington Cog Railway

In 2004, work was completed replacing the lower Waumbek Switch and Siding with an 1,800-foot (550 m) passing loop equipped with electric and hydraulically powered automated switches. These switches are powered by batteries and recharged by solar panels. One switch is located at each end of the loop, allowing ascending and descending trains to pass one another.

In 2008, work began on the first diesel locomotive to be powered with biodiesel, with the assistance of a retired mechanical engineer from the Portsmouth Naval Shipyard. By 2019, the railway completed the construction of seven of these locomotives.

In 2014, work began on another switch and siding at the summit of Mount Washington, to allow trains to pass one another at the summit of the mountain.

== Modern operations ==
A hiker on the West Side Trail watches the Mount Washington Cog Railway pass by, October 2016

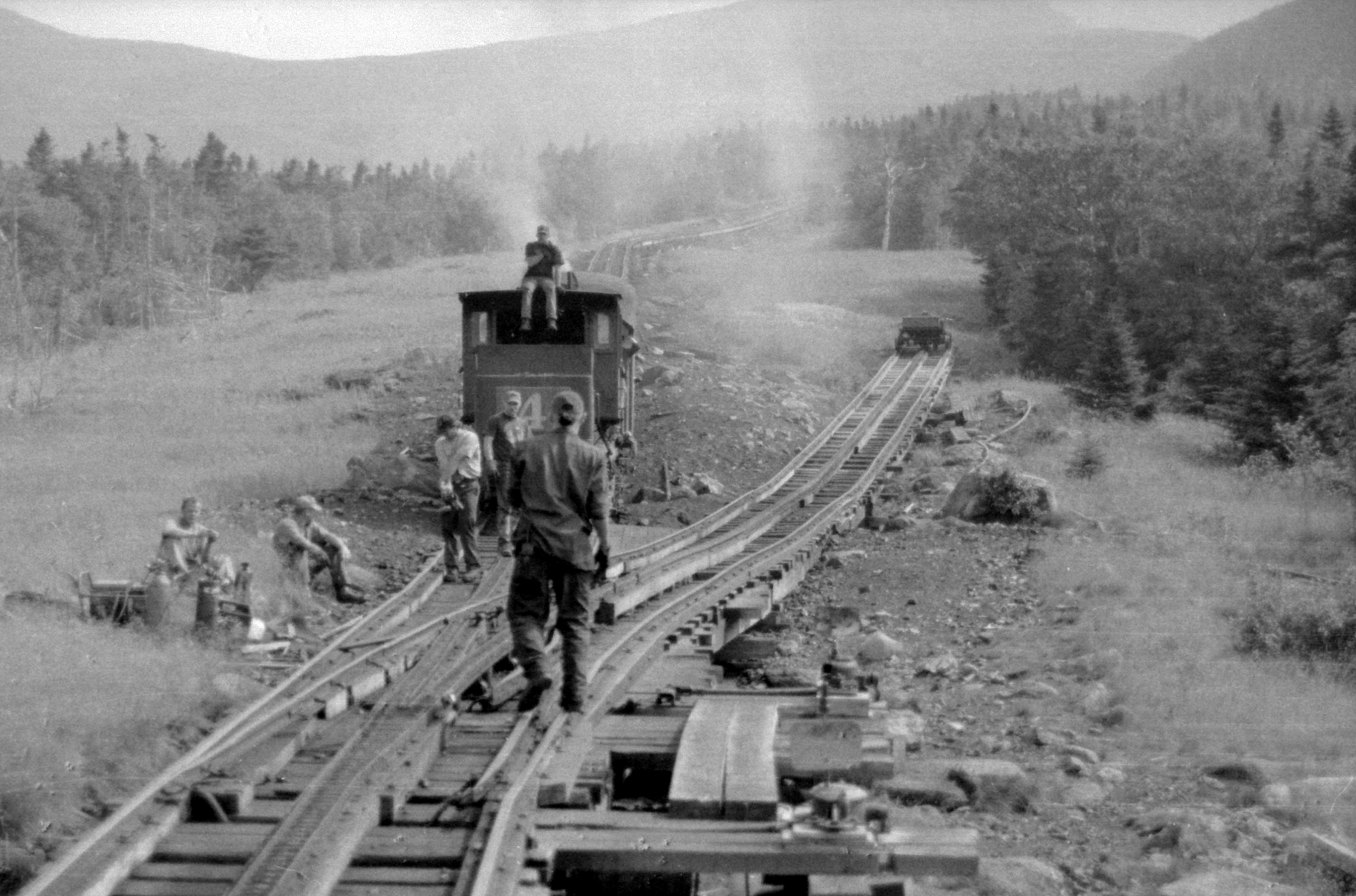
Railway operators, 2000

The most common trips on the Cog Railway are between the two main stations, one at the summit and the other adjacent to the operators' logistical and repair base.

From 2003 to 2006, "ski trains" ran, stopping at an intermediate station, from which passengers could ski down to the Base Station.

The Cog Railway track crosses over three hiking trails, including the Gulfside Trail, which is part of the Appalachian Trail. Some hikers have been known to wait for the next train in order to expose their buttocks to the passengers, a practice known as "Mooning the Cog". Several hikers were arrested for performing this act in 2007. The railway was in operation before these trails existed and they cross railroad property.

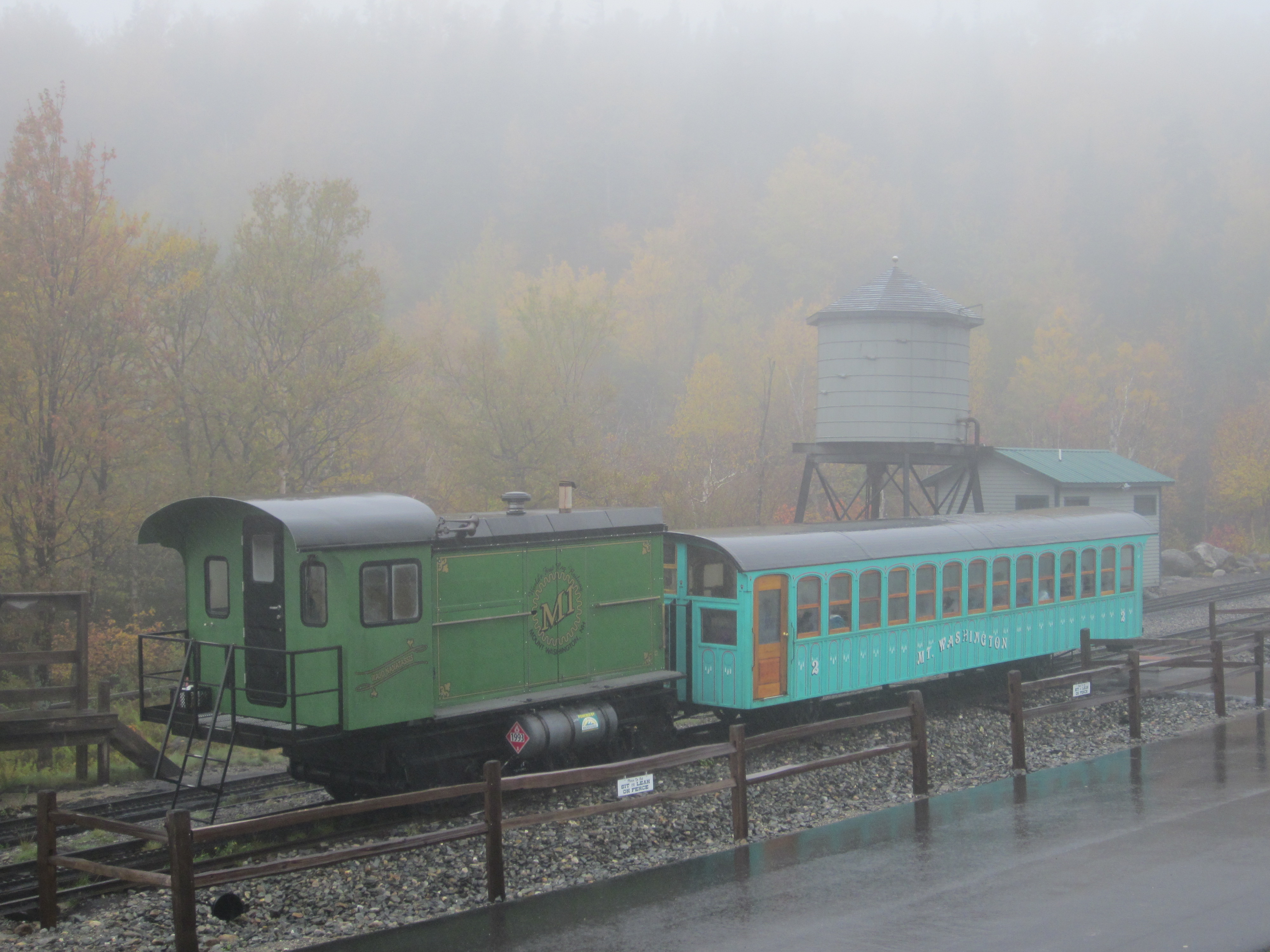
A Cog locomotive ready to push a passenger car up the Mount Washington Cog Railway on a foggy day in October 2012

Access to the base station by car is by three routes, each culminating with the upper portion of the dead-end Cog Base Road. The advertised, roughly eastbound route uses the Base Road's full length from Bretton Woods. An especially scenic route, initially southbound from U.S. Route 2, follows Jefferson Notch Road, a narrow dirt road with hairpin turns; it rises 1,500 feet (460 m) to the pass, at 3,000 feet (914 m) above sea level, between Mount Jefferson in the Presidential Range and Mount Dartmouth, before descending to its junction with the Base Road. The Jefferson Notch Road is closed to wheeled vehicles in winter – and usually before and after – and used primarily by snowmobiles. The roughly northbound route from U.S. Route 302 in Crawford Notch via Mt. Clinton Road is also closed in the winter to vehicular traffic. Operations of trains all winter began in 2004–2005, and the Cog Base Road is plowed and sanded all winter to allow tourists, skiers, and employees access to the Base Station.

== Environmental concerns ==
The steam locomotives on the railway generate large amounts of smoke, nicknamed "Cog Smog". The railway is exempted from the state's air-pollution-control law (RSA 125-C:20), which exempts "any steam locomotives and engines or replacements thereof used in connection with the operation of a railroad or railway which were in operation or on order prior to January 1, 1973, and are located entirely within the state."

Each three-mile (4.8 km) steam locomotive ride burns 1 short ton (0.89 long tons; 0.91 t) of coal and consumes 1,000 US gallons (830 imp gal; 3,800 L) of water.

One steam locomotive was converted to oil-firing in 2008. The attempt to oil-fire the existing steam locomotives failed, and in 2008 the railway introduced its first diesel locomotive, designed and built by the railroad staff. Since 2008, four more diesels were completed (M-2 and M-3 in 2009, M-4 in 2011, and M-5 in 2013). All the new diesel hydraulic locomotives are operated on B20 (20% biodiesel blend) during the summer season. The company stated that the primary reason the new diesels were built was to reduce the visual pollution caused by the coal-fired steam locomotives, to lower emissions, and to increase the length of time that passengers could spend at the summit of Mount Washington.

Each three-mile (4.8 km) diesel locomotive ride burns approximately 18 US gallons (15 imp gal; 68 L) of B20 (20% biodiesel blend) fuel.

The locomotives push passenger cars that have a capacity of 70 riders. The Cog Railway also rosters eight wooden coaches.

== Locomotives ==
Number	Name	Image	Builder	Motive power	Built	Status	Notes
1	Old Peppersass		Campbell, Whittier and Company	Steam	1866	Display	World's first cog locomotive, originally named Hero. Retired in 1878. Reconditioned in 1929 and wrecked 20 July 1929. Reassembled after the wreck and placed on display at Marshfield Station. Named Old Peppersass because of its vertical boiler's resemblance to a pepper sauce bottle.
1	Mt. Washington		Manchester Locomotive Works	Steam	1883	Stored, out of service	Was the first #7 Falcon; renumbered to 1 following rebuilding after the 1895 fire. Renamed Mt. Washington after 1931. Retired in the early 1990s.
2	Ammonoosuc		Manchester Locomotive Works	Steam	1875	Operational	Was second #4 Atlas; renumbered to 2 following rebuilding after the 1895 fire. Named Ammonoosuc after 1931. Equipped with the feedwater heater enhancement.
3	Agiocochook		Manchester Locomotive Works	Steam	1883	Stored, serviceable	Built as #2 of the Green Mountain Cog Railway. Was the third #5, not named; became the third #3 in 1934. Was named the Base Station. This was the locomotive in the fatal accident of 1967. Renamed Agiocochook in 1995 or 1996. Last operated in 2008 due to a failed boiler inspection.
4	Summit		Manchester Locomotive Works	Steam	1883	Display	Built as No. 1 of the Green Mountain Cog Railway, then became Mount Washington Cog Railway #4 Summit. Renamed Chocorua in 1999/2000. In 2007 it was renumbered and renamed as #8 Moosilauke, coincident with the retirement of the other locomotive with that name and number. Retired after the 2009 season. In July 2013 the locomotive was donated to the village of Twin Mountain and placed on permanent static display at the intersection of U.S. Route 3 and U.S. Route 302. In August 2018, the engine's cab was replaced and retained its original name and number after some refurbishing.
6	Kancamagus		Manchester Locomotive Works	Steam	1874	Stored, serviceable	Originally built as first #6 Tip-Top with vertical boiler. Rebuilt into second #6 in 1878 with horizontal boiler. Was named Great Gulf. Renamed Kancamagus in 2000/2001. Last operated in 2010.
8	Moosilauke		Mount Washington Cog Railway Shop	Steam	1983	Stored, out of service	Built in 1983 by Mike Kenly at the Cog Shop. Was named the Tip-Top. Renamed Moosilauke in 2002. Last operated in 2006, and in 2007 a major boiler overhaul was underway when the project was scrapped in favor of building a new diesel locomotive. The cab and tender of #8 Tip-Top/Moosilauke now rides on #4 Summit/Chocorua. The rest of the engine (boiler, firebox, etc.) remains in storage.
9	Waumbek		Manchester Locomotive Works	Steam	1908	Operational	First horizontal boiler engine to have the cab on the same plane as the boiler. For a short time, this locomotive burned biodiesel, but was reconverted to coal. Has the feedwater heater enhancement.
10	Col. Teague		Mount Washington Cog Railway Shop	Steam	1972	Display	Uses a larger, welded boiler built by Munroe Boiler. Has the cab tilted on the same plane as the boiler. Converted to burn oil for a short time and converted back to coal. Was renamed the KroFlite. Last operated in 2009, and in October 2015 it now sits at the intersection of U.S. Route 302 and Base Station Road, bearing its original name as a sign for the entrance to the railway.
M-1	Wajo Nanatassis		Mount Washington Cog Railway Shop	Diesel	2008	Operational	First diesel-hydraulic locomotive. Powered by biodiesel (B20). The name means "mountain hummingbird" in the Abenaki language.
M-2	Algonquin		Mount Washington Cog Railway Shop	Diesel	2009	Operational	Second diesel-hydraulic locomotive. Powered by biodiesel (B20). Algonquin are Indigenous people who now live in Eastern Canada.
M-3	Abenaki		Mount Washington Cog Railway Shop	Diesel	2009	Operational	Third diesel-hydraulic locomotive. Powered by biodiesel (B20), Abenaki are Indigenous people of the Northeastern Woodlands of Canada and the United States.
M-4	Agiocochook		Mount Washington Cog Railway Shop	Diesel	2010	Operational	Fourth diesel-hydraulic locomotive. Powered by biodiesel (B20). Agiocochook is a name some Indigenous peoples use for Mt. Washington.
M-5	Metallak		Mount Washington Cog Railway Shop	Diesel	2013	Operational	Fifth diesel-hydraulic locomotive. Powered by biodiesel (B20), Metallak was a Native American hunter and guide who is honored on a New Hampshire historical marker (number 47).
M-6	LaPrade		Mount Washington Cog Railway Shop	Diesel	2016	Operational	Sixth diesel-hydraulic locomotive. Powered by biodiesel (B20). Named after Al LaPrade, primary designer of the railway's first diesel locomotive.
M-7	Kenison		Mount Washington Cog Railway Shop	Diesel	2019	Operational	Seventh diesel-hydraulic locomotive. Powered by biodiesel (B20). Named after Charley Kenison, general manager of the railway.

== See also ==
- Conway Scenic Railroad
- List of rack railways
- Pikes Peak Cog Railway
- Mount Washington Auto Road
- New Hampshire Historical Marker 45: Cog Railway
- Quincy and Torch Lake Cog Railway
