= Mountain railway =

Railway which operates within a mountainous region

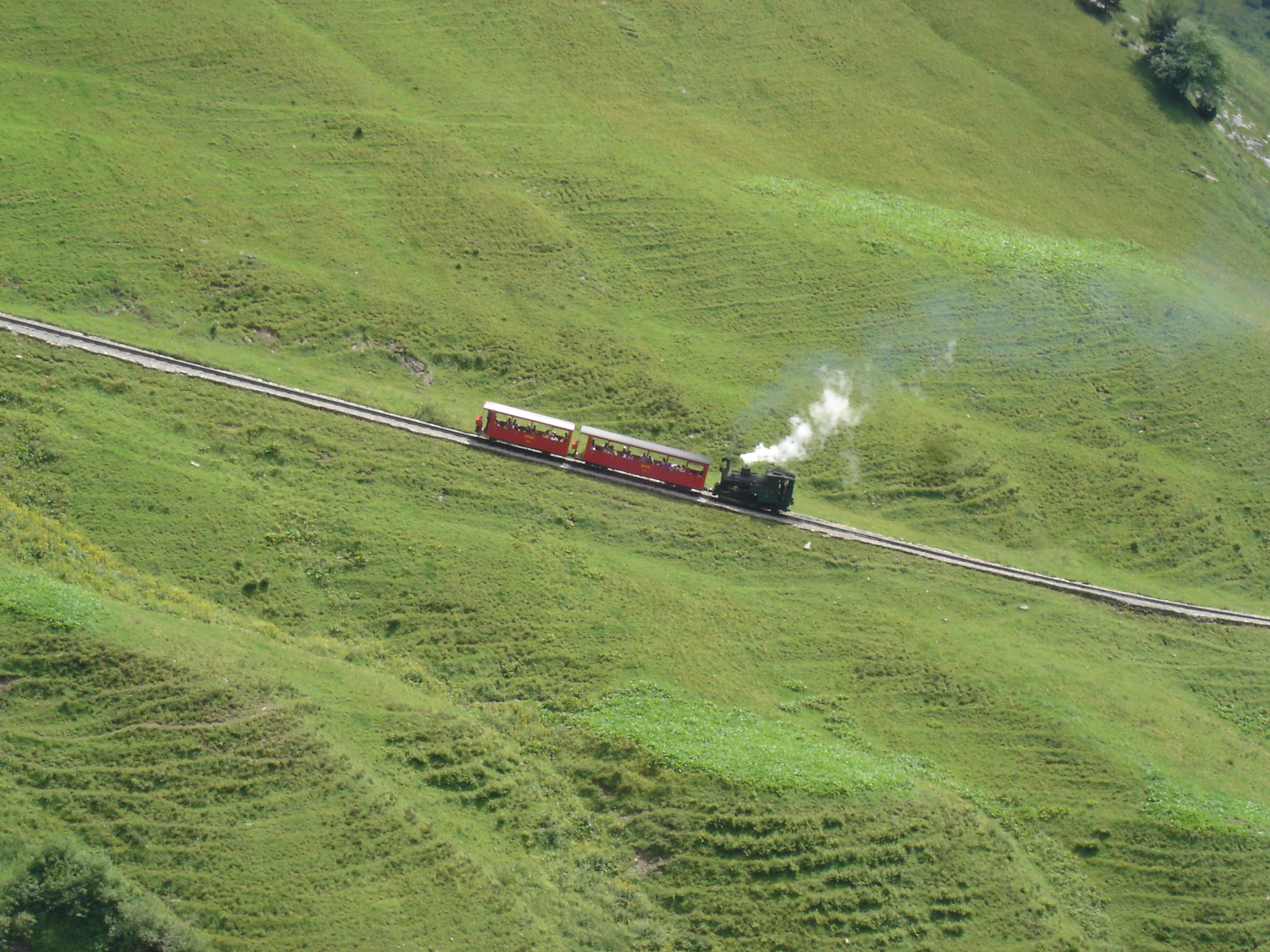
Brienz Rothorn Bahn ascending Brienzer Rothorn in the Swiss Alps

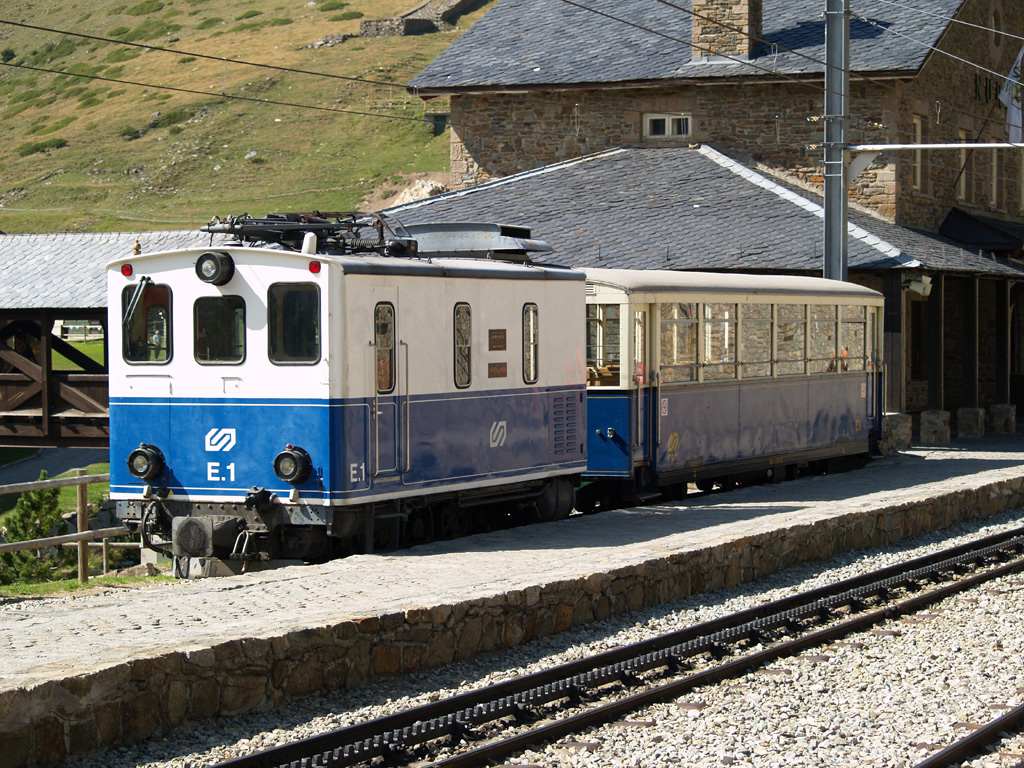
Vall de Núria Rack Railway, Catalonia

A mountain railway is a railway that operates in a mountainous region. It may operate through the mountains by following mountain valleys and tunneling beneath mountain passes, or it may climb a mountain to provide transport to and from the summit.

Mountain railways often use narrow gauge tracks to allow for tight curves in the track and reduce tunnel size and structure gauge, and hence construction cost and effort. Where mountain railways need to climb steep gradients, they may use steep grade railway technology, or even operate as funicular railways.

== List of mountain railways ==
=== Argentina ===
- Mendoza to Los Andes, Chile, see Chile below

=== Australia ===
- Glenreagh Mountain Railway
- Skitube

=== Austria ===
- Achensee Railway
- Arlberg Railway
- Mariazell Railway
- Pöstlingberg Railway
- Semmering Railway – A World Heritage Site

=== Bolivia ===
- Ferrocarril de Antofagasta a Bolivia
- Ferrocarril de Arica a La Paz, Arica–La Paz
- Rio Mulatos-Potosí line

=== Brazil ===
- São Paulo Railway

=== Canada ===
- BC Rail, crosses the Pacific Coast Range of the Coast Mountains (Garibaldi & Lillooet Ranges)
- Kicking Horse Pass
- Rogers Pass
- White Pass and Yukon Route
- Yellowhead Pass

=== Chile ===
- Ferrocarill Arica La Paz, Arica–La Paz
- Ferrocarril de Antofagasta a Bolivia
- El Ferrocarril Trasandino Los Andes – Mendoza, Los Andes – Mendoza. The rebuild will be adhesion only.

=== China ===
- Gebishi Railway
- Kunming–Hai Phong Railway
- Qingzang railway

=== Colombia ===
- Colombian Railways

=== Croatia ===
- Lika line
- Rijeka line

=== Eritrea ===
- Eritrean Railway

=== France ===
- Artouste (Petit train d')
- La Rhune (Petit train de)
- Mont Blanc Tramway
- Chemin de fer du Montenvers
- Saint Gervais-Vallorcine (Ligne de)
- Ligne de Cerdagne

=== Germany ===
- Harz Railway (Harzbahn) or (Harzquerbahn)
  - Rübeland Railway (Rübelandbahn)
  - Harz Narrow Gauge Railways (Harzer Schmalspurbahnen)
    - Brocken Railway (Brockenbahn)
    - Selke Valley Railway(Selketalbahn)
- Schwarza Valley Railway (Schwarzatalbahn)

=== Georgia ===
- Borjomi-Bakuriani railway "Kukushka" (ბაკურიანი-ბორჯომი რკინიგზა)

=== India ===
- Darjeeling Himalayan Railway – A world Heritage Site
- Nilgiri Mountain Railway – A world Heritage Site
- Kalka-Shimla Railway – A world Heritage Site
- Kangra Valley Railway
- Matheran Hill Railway
- Jammu–Baramulla line

=== Isle of Man ===
- Snaefell Mountain Railway

=== Israel ===
- Carmelit

=== Japan ===
- Aizu Railway
- Chuo Main Line (especially central portion between Takao Station and Nakatsugawa Station)
- Dosan Line
- Echigo Tokimeki Railway Myōkō Haneuma Line (former Shin'etsu Main Line, around Nihongi Station)
- Eizan Electric Railway
- Etsumi North Line
- Hakone Tozan Railway
- Hakubi Line
- Hisatsu Line
- Hohi Main Line
- Iida Line
- Joetsu Line
- Fujikyuko Line
- Geibi Line (especially east of Miyoshi Station)
- Hokuetsu Express Hokuhoku Line
- Kamaishi Line
- Keihan Keishin Line (interurban line with steep gradients)
- Kintetsu Nara Line
- Kisuki Line
- Kobe Electric Railway
- Kurobe Gorge Railway (mostly sightseeing-oriented line originally used in dam construction)
- Minobu Line
- Nagaragawa Railway
- Nankai Koya Line (south of Hashimoto Station (Wakayama))
- Ou Main Line, including Yamagata Shinkansen through services
- Oito Line (especially north of Shinano-Omachi Station)
- Seibu Chichibu Line
- Sekisho Line (east of Shin-Yubari Station)
- Shinonoi Line
- The former Shin'etsu Main Line over the Usui Pass (abandoned)
- Tadami Line
- Takayama Main Line
- Yagan Railway

=== Mexico ===
- Ferrocarril de Córdoba a Huatusco

=== New Zealand ===
- Rimutaka Incline Commenced operation in 1878 and ceased operation in 1955.

=== Norway ===
- Flåm Line

=== Peru ===
- Empresa nacional de ferrocarriles del Peru
- Ferrocarril Central Andino (Standard gauge)
- Ferrocarril Huancayo - Huancavelica, (built to narrow gauge 3 ft or 914 mm, but converted to 4 ft 8 1/2 in or 1,435 mm standard gauge between 2006 and 2010)
- Ferrocarril del sur de Peru Arequipa – Puno, (Standard gauge)
- Cusco - Machu Picchu, Cusco – Machu Picchu (3 ft or 914 mm gauge)

=== Poland ===
- Silesian Mountain Railway

=== Romania ===
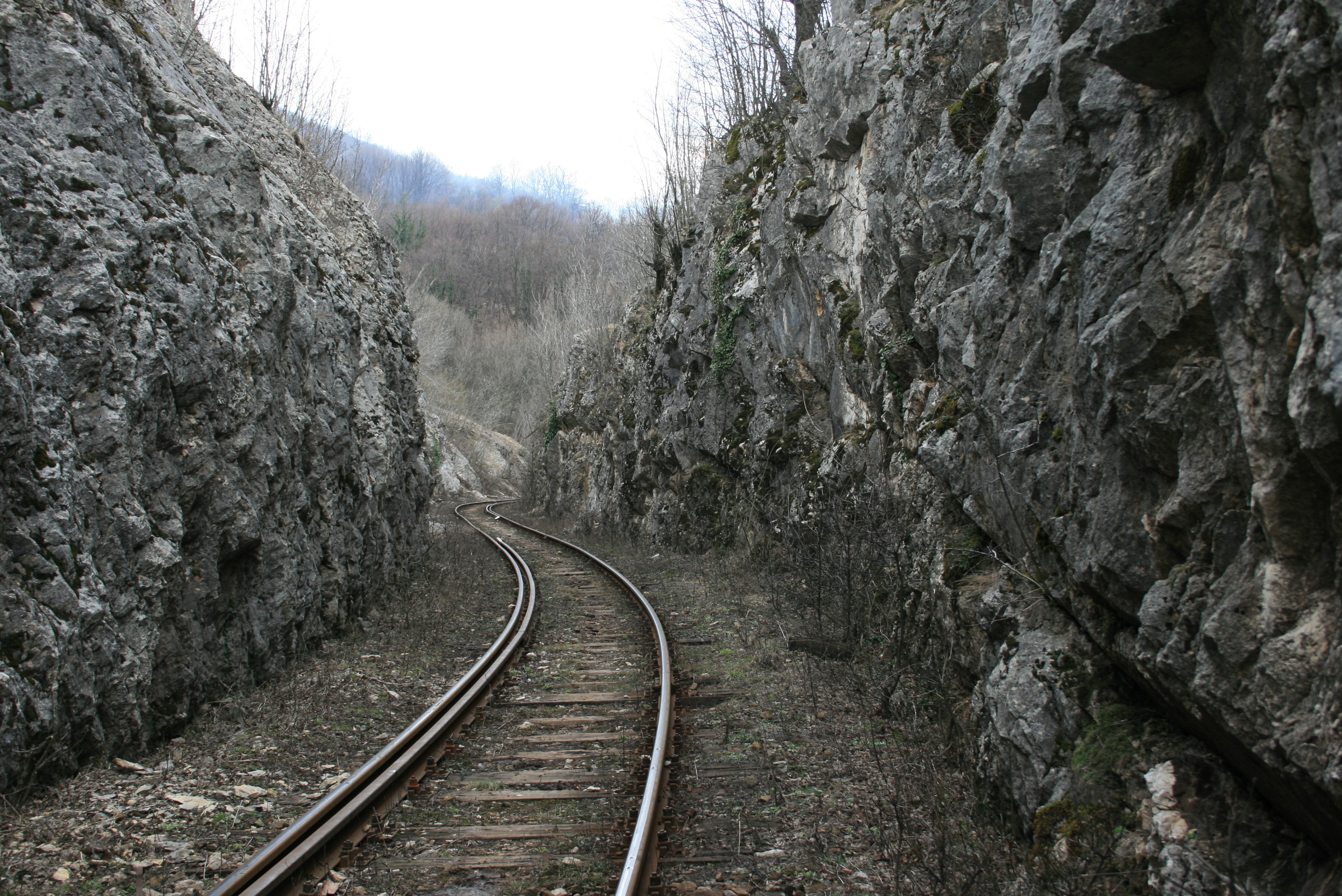
View from Oravița – Anina railway in 2010

- Ploiești – Brașov railway
- Brașov – Sibiu – Arad railway
- Râmnicu Vâlcea – Sibiu railway
- Târgu Jiu – Simeria railway
- Drobeta-Turnu Severin – Caransebeș railway
- Oravița – Anina railway
- Cluj-Napoca – Oradea railway
- Brașov – Miercurea Ciuc – Deda railway, and Brașov – Întorsura Buzăului
- Salva – Sighetu Marmației railway
- Adjud – Siculeni railway
- Suceava – Ilva Mică railway, and Vama – Moldovița
- Arad – Ineu – Brad
- Buzău – Nehoiașu

=== Russia ===
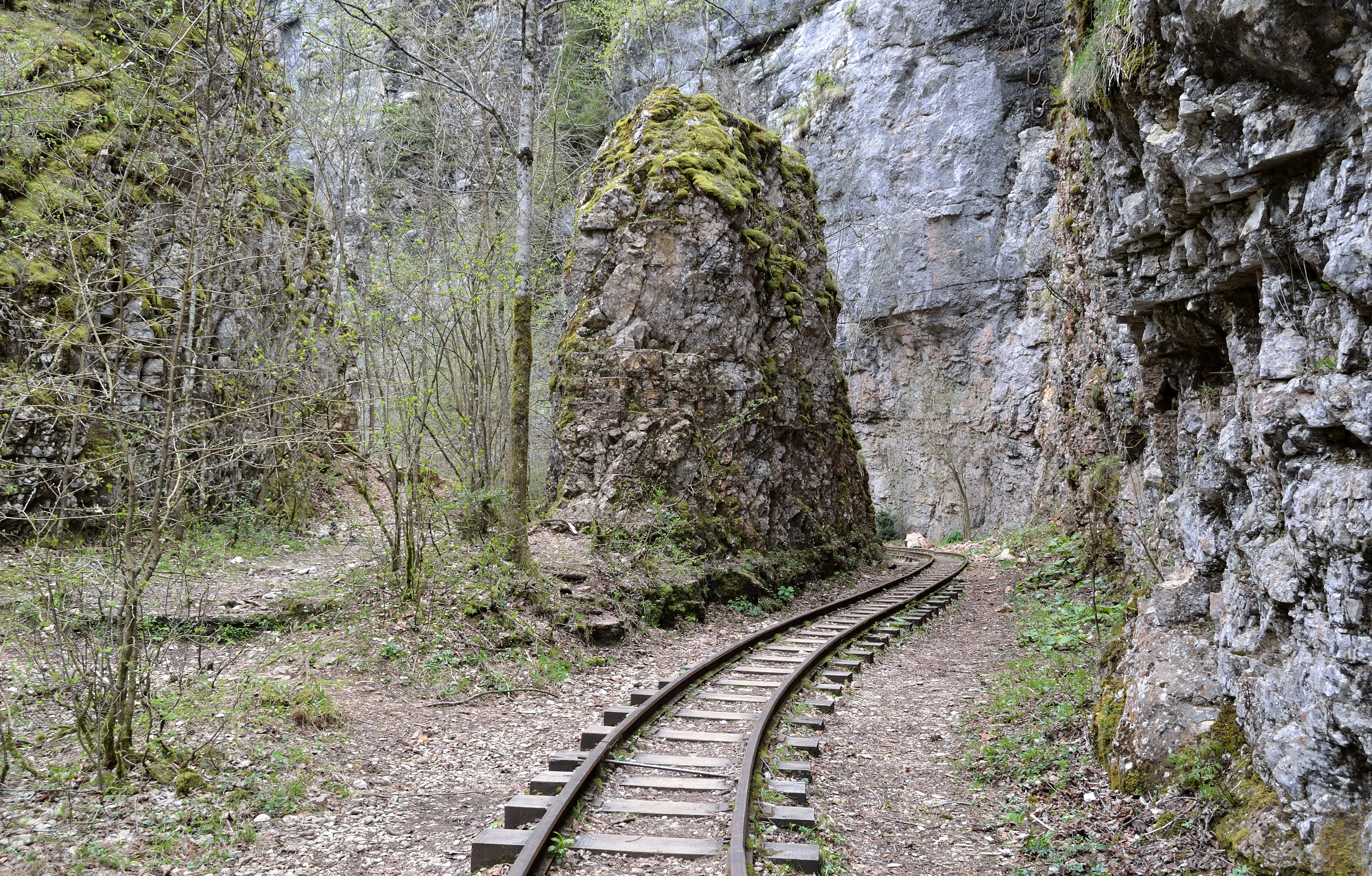
Apsheronsk railway

- Apsheronsk narrow-gauge railway – located in the Krasnodar Krai, gauge of 750 mm (2 ft 5 1/2 in).

=== Slovakia ===
- Čierny Hron Railway

=== Slovenia ===
- Bohinj railway

=== Spain ===
- Vall de Núria Rack Railway

=== Switzerland ===
- Appenzell Railways
- Lauterbrunnen–Mürren Mountain Railway
- Rheineck–Walzenhausen mountain railway
- Lötschberg railway
- Bernese Oberland Railway
- Chemin de fer Aigle-Sépey-Diablerets
- Chemins de fer électriques Veveysans (CEV)
- Montreux–Glion–Rochers-de-Naye railway line
- Chemin de fer Nyon-St-Cergue-Morez
- Emmental-Burgdorf-Thun-Bahn
- Gornergratbahn
- Gotthardbahn
- Jungfraubahn
- Harderbahn
- Matterhorn Gotthard Bahn (formerly BVZ Zermatt-Bahn, Furka Oberalp Bahn)
- Monte Generoso Railway
- Montreux–Lenk im Simmental line
- Pilatusbahn
- Rhätische Bahn
- Rheineck–Walzenhausen mountain railway (RhW, now AB)
- Rorschach-Heiden-Bahn
- Schynige Platte Bahn
- Transports de Martigny et Régions (Chemin de fer Martigny–Châtelard and Chemin de fer Martigny–Orsières)
- Trogenerbahn
- Uetlibergbahn
- Wädenswil–Einsiedeln railway
- Wengernalpbahn
- Waldenburgerbahn
- Zentralbahn (former Luzern-Stans-Engelberg-Bahn, Brünigbahn)

=== Taiwan ===
- Alishan Forest Railway
- Taiping Mountain Forest Railway

=== United Kingdom ===
- Brecon Mountain Railway
- Cairngorm Mountain Railway
- Conwy Valley line
- Ffestiniog Railway
- Highland Main Line
- Settle–Carlisle line
- Snowdon Mountain Railway
- Welsh Highland Railway
- West Highland Line

=== United States ===
- Alamogordo and Sacramento Mountain Railway
- Boca and Loyalton Railroad
- Carson and Tahoe Lumber and Fluming Company
- Cascade Tunnel
- Cass Scenic Railroad State Park
- Central Pacific Railroad
- Denver and Rio Grande Western Railroad
- Denver and Salt Lake Railway
- Durango and Silverton Narrow Gauge Railroad
- Feather River Route
- Green Mountain Cog Railway (abandoned)
- Georgetown Loop Railroad
- Gilpin Railroad
- Lookout Mountain Incline Railway in Chattanooga, Tennessee
- Michigan-California Lumber Company
- Mount Lowe Railway
- Mount Tom Railroad
- Mountain Division
- Northwestern Pacific Railroad
- Otis Elevating Railway
- Raton Pass
- Rio Grande Southern Railroad
- San Diego and Arizona Railway
- Sandy River and Rangeley Lakes Railroad
- Silver City, Pinos Altos and Mogollon Railroad
- Silverton Railroad
- Tehachapi Loop
- Uintah Railway
- White Pass and Yukon Route

=== Venezuela ===
- Gran Ferrocarril de Venezuela

== Mountain railways in fiction ==
The Culdee Fell Railway is featured in the book Mountain Engines, part of The Railway Series by Rev.W.Awdry.

== See also ==
- Cable car (railway)
- Cable railway
- Funicular
- Hillclimbing (railway)
- List of steepest gradients on adhesion railways
- Rack railway
- Ruling gradient
- Stadler Rail (Swiss Locomotive and Machine Works)
- Steep grade railway
