= Steep grade railway =

Type of railway

A steep grade railway is a railway that ascends and descends a slope that has a steep grade. Such railways can use a number of different technologies to overcome the steepness of the grade.

== Usage ==
Many steep grade railways are located in mountain regions, and are hence also mountain railways. They are most commonly found in extremely mountainous regions, like Switzerland, where they provide commuter service or tourist access. They can be found in urban areas with extreme contiguous elevation changes where they may be used for public transportation or for residential access.

== Technology ==
After exceeding a grade of 15% the rail is generally too steep for a standard adhesion railway to climb such a gradient in suboptimal conditions. This is because the friction diminishes as the grade increases enough to be overcome by gravity which can put the train in danger of sliding down the track, often uncontrollably. In practice the diminishing effect of friction affects downhill braking capability before it affects uphill climbing ability, and some mountain railways at the lower end of the steepness spectrum rely on standard adhesion for propulsion, but use special track brakes acting directly on the rails.

Rack and pinion animation

==== Three Rail Systems ====
A Railway where a toothed cog wheel engages with a toothed rack rail laid between the tracks. An alternative to the rack and pinion railway is the Fell system, in which traction and/or braking wheels are applied to a central rail under pressure.

==== Cable Cars ====
Another alternative is a cable car in which the car runs on rails, but grasps a continuously moving cable underneath the rails for propulsion, releasing the cable to stop. This is used in San Francisco's famous cable cars.

==== Funicular Railway ====
Finally at the steepest end of the spectrum, a funicular railway may be used. Here a cable is used to haul counterbalanced trains up and down the track. The cars are permanently attached to the cable, which stops, starts and reverses as required. Cars are often custom built for the slope, with specially raked seating and steps rather than a sloped floor however is not necessary, see Stoosbahn.

== Lists of steep grade railways ==
- List of steepest gradients on adhesion railways
- List of Fell system railways
- List of rack railways
- List of cable hauled railways
- List of funicular railways
- Hillclimbing (railway)

== Gallery ==
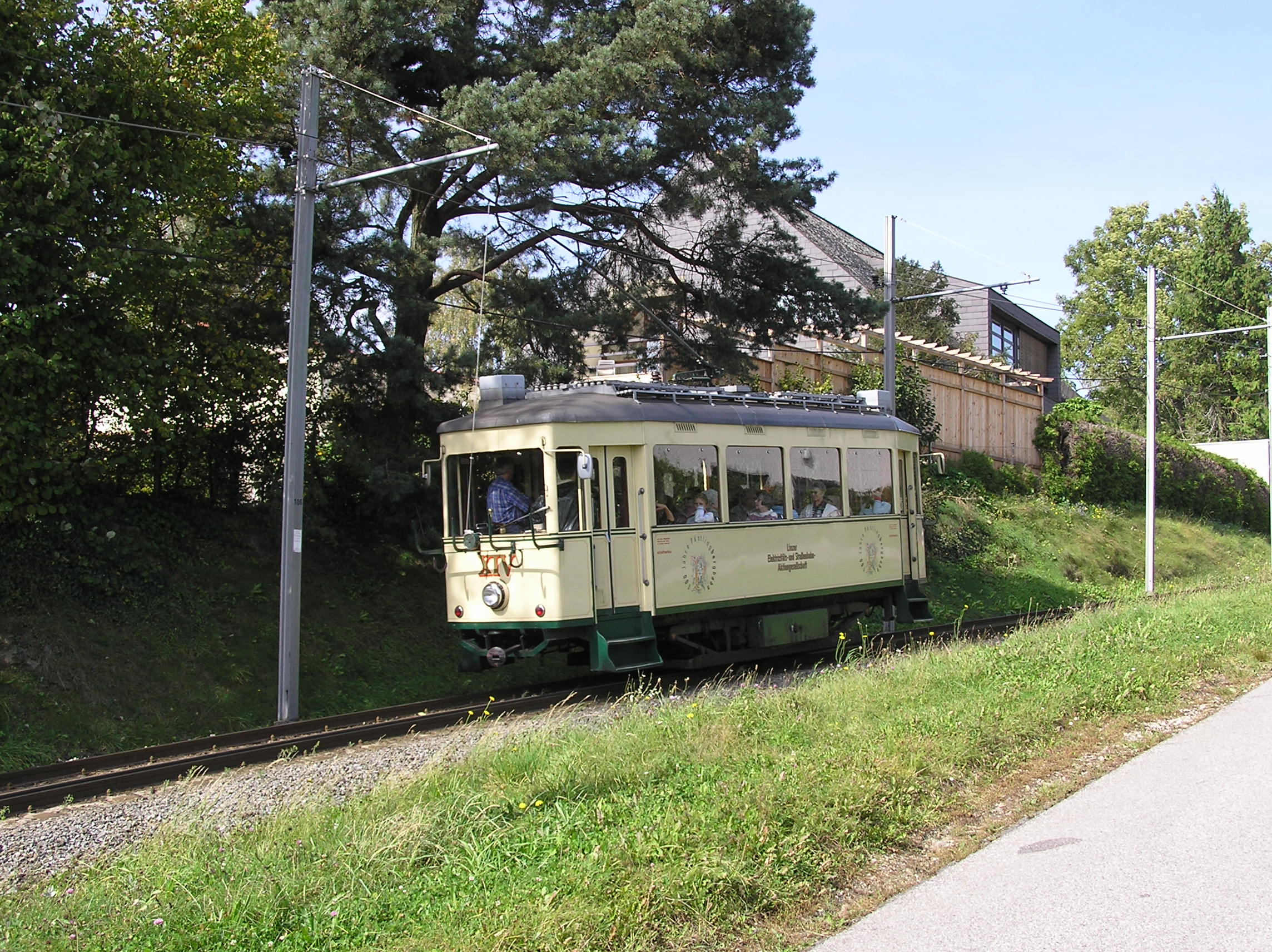
The Pöstlingbergbahn is one of the steepest railways that uses only adhesion

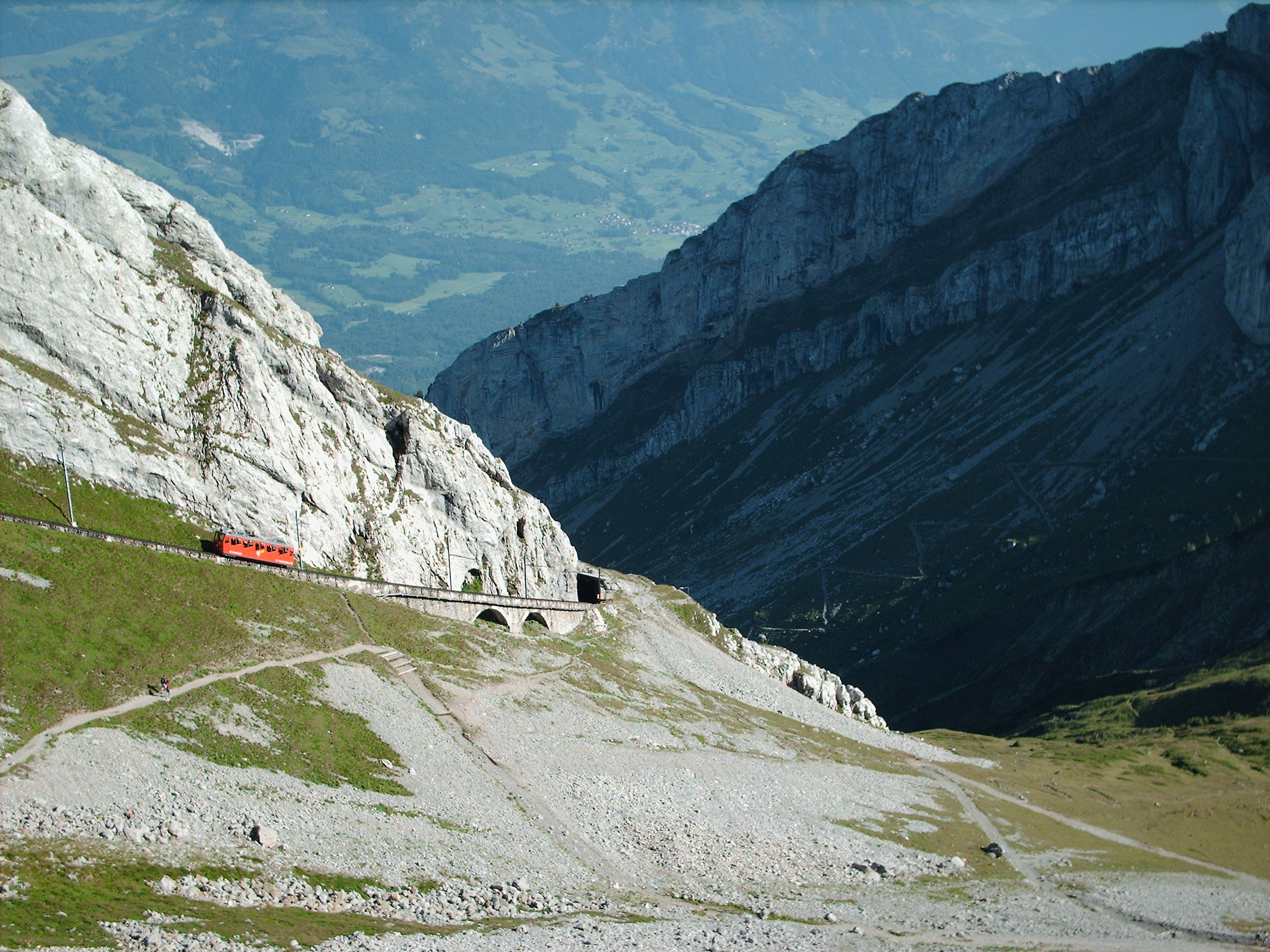
The Pilatusbahn is the steepest rack railway

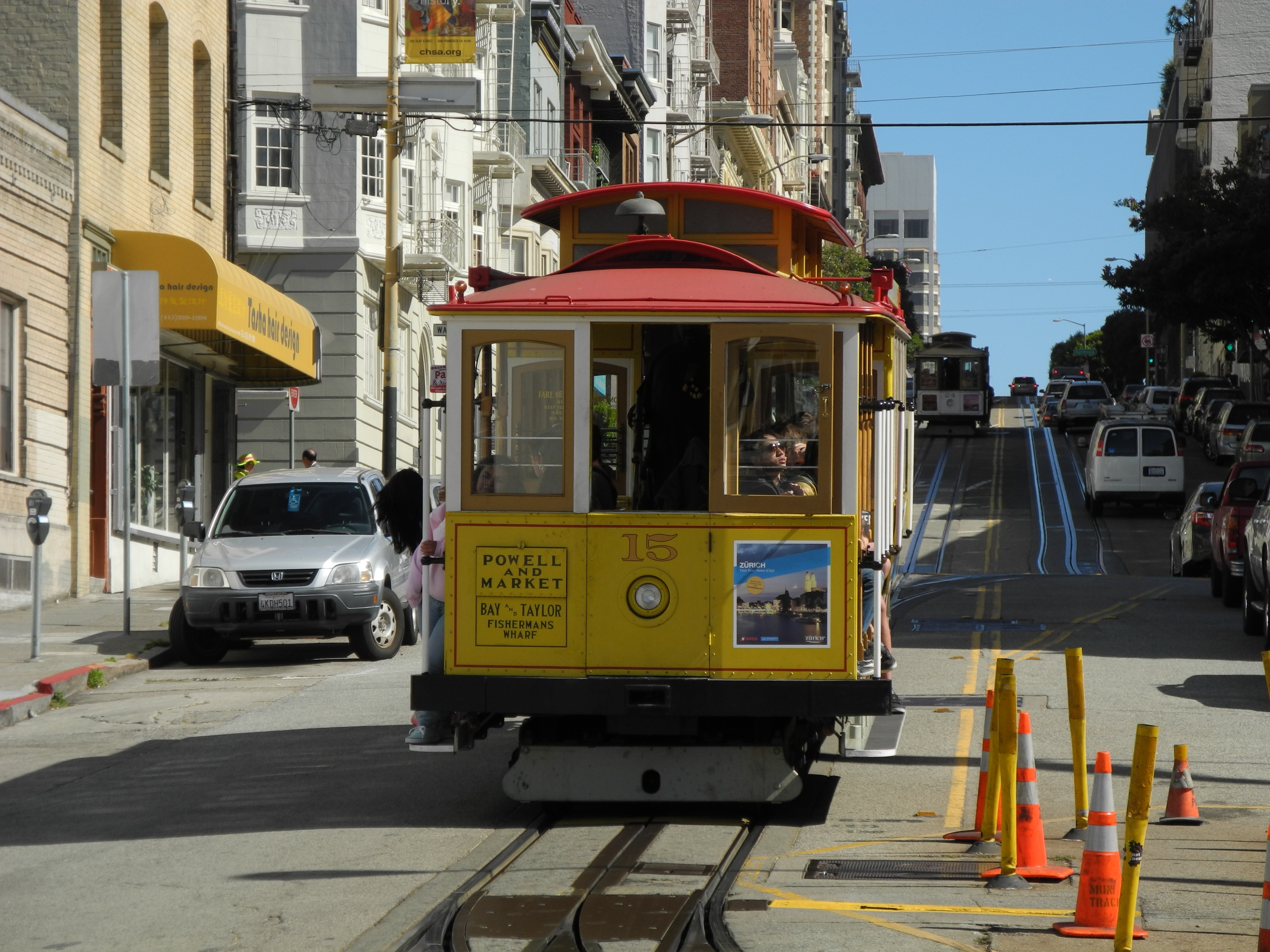
The San Francisco cable car system

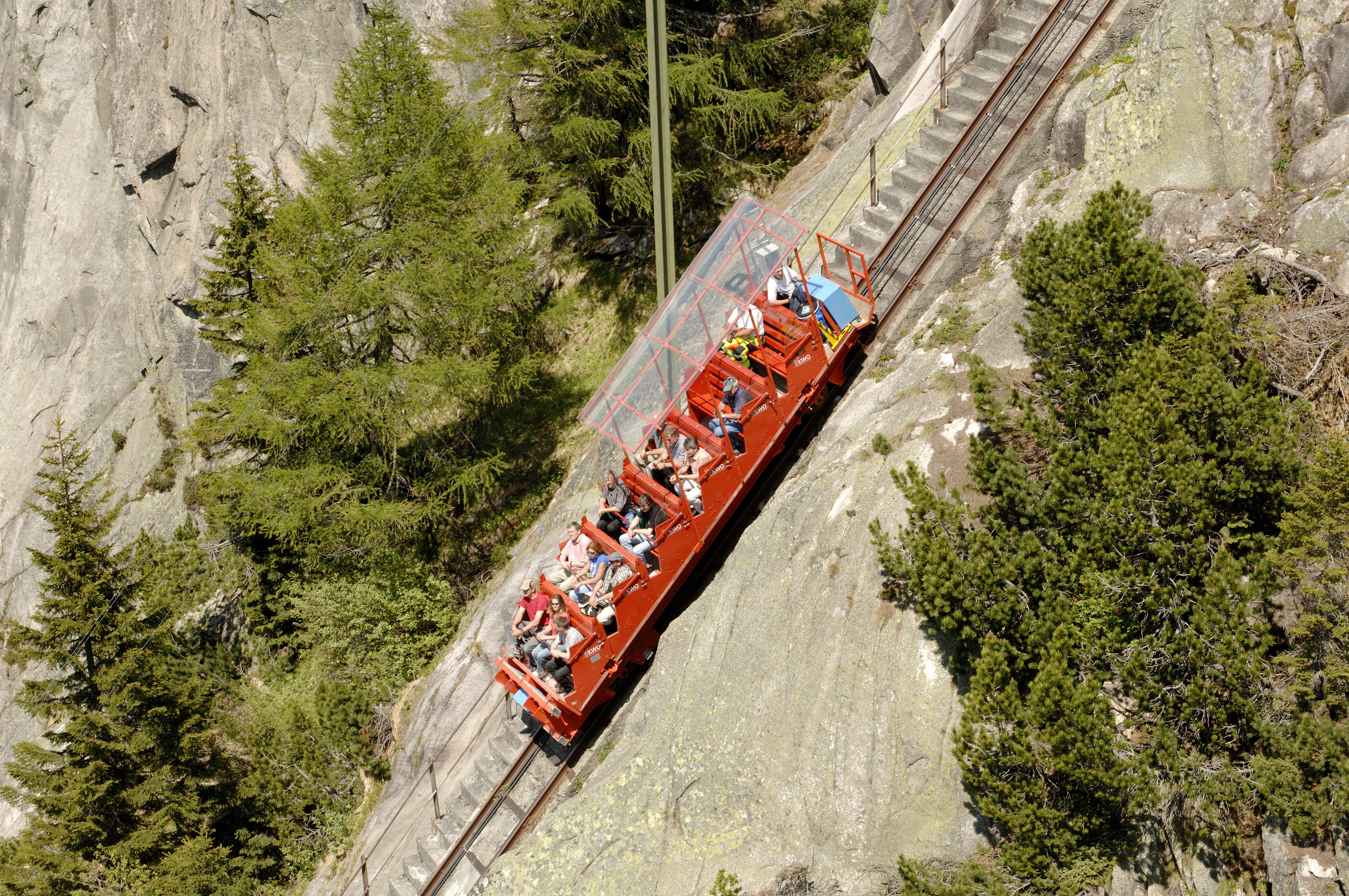
The Gelmerbahn funicular railway

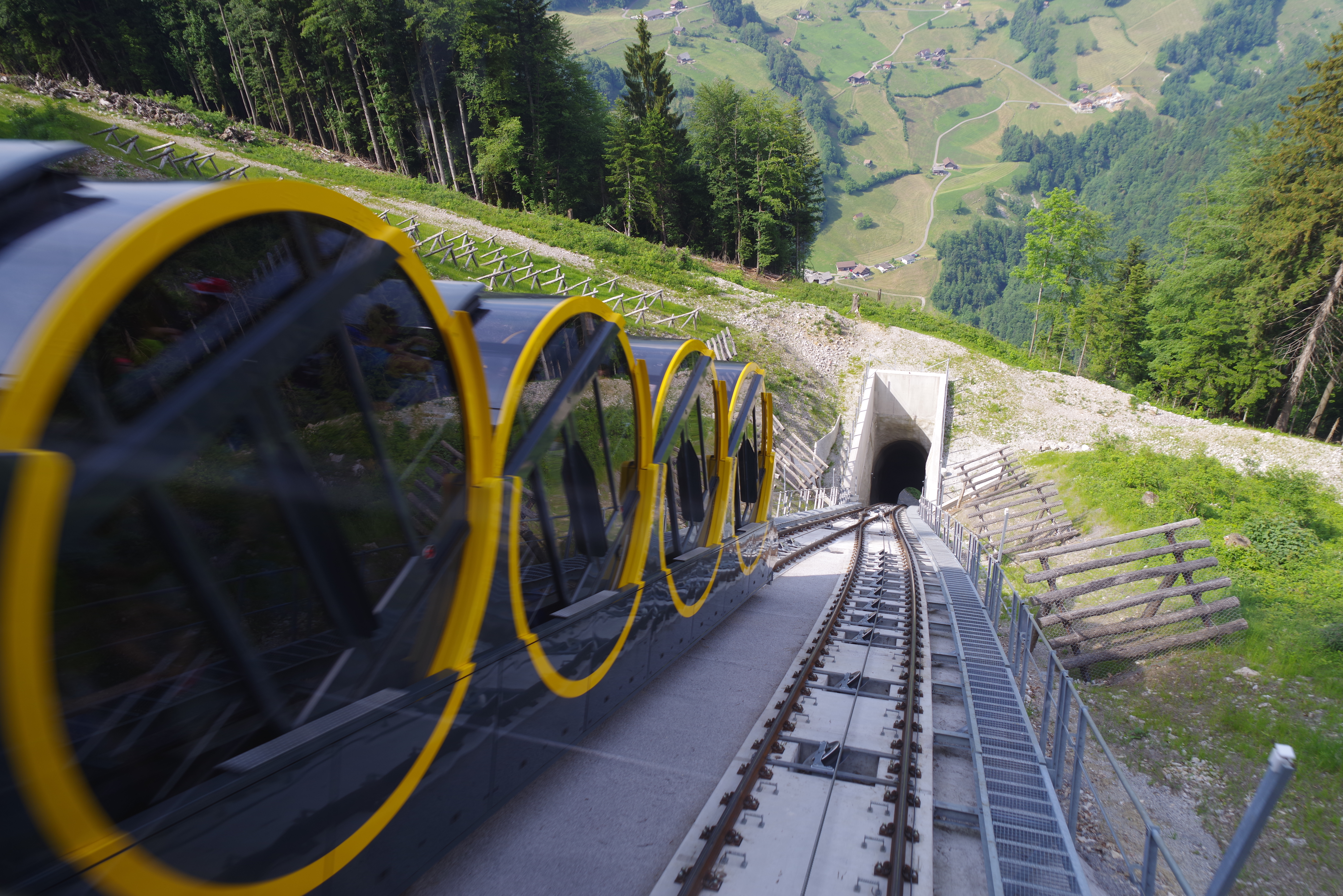
The two Stoosbahn carriages passing the midway point
