= Ruling gradient =

Steepest grade on a railroad line

In railroading, the ruling grade is the steepest grade on the rail line between two locations. Climbing the steepest part of the line dictates the minimum motive power needed, or how light the train must be, in order for the run to be made without assistance. While a low-powered (and inexpensive) locomotive can handle less-steep sections, which might be the majority of a run, the more powerful locomotive is needed for the steeper parts. Therefore, this steep section "rules" or controls the whole line, even though that requires more power than necessary for the other sections. This is why special "helper engines" (also dubbed "Bankers") are often stationed near steep grades on otherwise mild tracks. It is cheaper than running a more powerful (and thus more costly) locomotive over the entire track mileage in order to make the grade, especially when multiple trains run over the line each day (to help justify the fixed daily cost of the helper operation).

In the 1953 edition of Railway Engineering William H. Hay says "The ruling grade may be defined as the maximum gradient over which a tonnage train can be hauled with one locomotive...The ruling grade does not necessarily have the maximum gradient on the division. Momentum grades, pusher grades, or those that must regularly be doubled by tonnage trains may be heavier." This means the "ruling grade" may change if the management chooses to operate the railroad differently.

== Compensation for curvature ==
Other things being equal, a train is harder to pull around a curve than it is on straight track because the wagons – especially bogie (2 axle) wagons – try to follow the chord of the curve and not the arc. To compensate for this, the gradient should be a little less steep the sharper the curve is; the necessary grade reduction is assumed to be given by a simple formula such as 0.04 per cent per "degree of curve", the latter being a measure of curve sharpness used in the United States. On a 10-degree curve (radius 573.7 feet) the grade would thus need to be 0.4% less than the grade on straight track.

== General situation in North America ==
In steam days Southern Pacific trains eastward across Nevada and Utah faced nothing steeper than 0.43% in the 531 miles from Sparks to Ogden—except for a few miles of 1.4% east of Wells. Trains would leave Sparks with enough engine to manage the 0.43% grade (e.g. a 2-10-2 with a 5500-ton train) and would get helper engines at Wells; the "ruling grade" from Sparks to Ogden could be considered 0.43%. But nowadays the railroad doesn't base helper engines at Wells so trains must leave Sparks with enough power to climb the 1.4%, making that the division's ruling grade.

As such, the term can be ambiguous; and is even more ambiguous if the ruling grade is impacted by the effect of a momentum grade. Overland Route trains from Sacramento, California to Oakland face nothing steeper than 0.5% on Track 1, the traditional westward track, but nowadays they might need to approach the Benicia bridge on Track 2, which includes 0.7 miles at about 1.9% on otherwise near-level track. Using this as an example, several issues arise on defining "ruling grade". One issue is whether a running start should be assumed and, if yes, the speed to assume. Another issue is the train length to assume, given that certain lengths exceed the length of the hill in question. And if a running start at some arbitrary speed is assumed, the calculated "ruling grade" will be different for locomotives having different power-vs-speed characteristics.

In the United States, Congress set the Standard Grade for railroads eligible for subsidies and grants in the 1850s. They took as that standard the one adopted by the Cumberland – Wheeling Railway, that grade being 116 feet per mile (22.0 m/km) or 2.2%. Later when charters were drawn up for the Canadian Pacific Railway in Canada and for the Union Pacific Railroad, the national governments imposed the Standard Ruling Grade on the two lines because each received federal assistance and regulation. (Vance, JE Jr.,1995)

== Curve and Gradient Books ==
- Australian Rail Track Corporation – excludes Transport Asset Holding Entity lines, and non-operational country lines.

== See also ==
- Grade (slope)
- Hillclimbing (railway)
- List of steepest gradients on adhesion railways
- Mountain railway
- Rack railway
