= List of steepest gradients on adhesion railways =

This is a list of steep grades along adhesion railways, the most common type of railway that relies on the friction between the drive wheels and the tracks for traction. The inclusion of steep gradients on railways avoids the expensive engineering work required to produce more gentle gradients. However, the maximum feasible gradient is limited by how much of a load the locomotive(s) can haul upwards. Braking when travelling downhill is also a limiting factor.

Tramways and light railways often have steeper gradients than heavier railways. This is because all wheels are usually connected to engine power in order to give better acceleration. Grades of 5% are not uncommon on them. Metros and pure commuter railways often also allow steeper gradients, over 4%, for the same reason. High-speed railways commonly allow 2.5% to 4% because the trains must be strong and have many wheels with power to reach very high speeds. For freight trains, gradients should be as gentle as possible, preferably below 1.5%.

In addition to simple rail adhesion, there have been other solutions to hauling rail mounted vehicles up or down inclines, such as rack railways and cable inclines (including rail mounted water tanks to carry barges). To help with braking on the descent, a non-load-bearing "brake rail" located between the running rails can be used, similar to the rail used in the Fell system, e.g. by the Snaefell Mountain Railway on the Isle of Man.

== Examples ==
The list below is of some of the steepest gradients on adhesion railways, in order of decreasing steepness:

Gradient	Line	Date Open	Notes
1 in 7.2 (13.8%)	Calçada de São Francisco, Lisbon Tramways, Portugal	1873	In past, cable trams or funiculars only as hills too steep for horses. Currently used by unassisted electric trams.
1 in 8.6 (11.6%)	Pöstlingbergbahn, Austria	1898	
1 in 9 (11.1%)	Cass Scenic Railway, West Virginia, United States	1901	Former logging railway, steepest non-electrified adhesion railway
1 in 9 (11%) or 1 in 10 (10%)	Estrada de Ferro Campos do Jordão, Brazil		22 existing railways merged and nationalised in 1953
1 in 9.5 (10.5%)	Roaring Camp & Big Trees Narrow Gauge Railroad, California, United States	1963	3 ft narrow gauge heritage railroad. Steepest portion is a switchback constructed in 1976, after the original Corkscrew Trestle alignment was destroyed by fire. Steepest narrow-gauge passenger grade in the world.
1 in 10 (10%)	Sheffield Supertram, Sheffield, England	1994	
1 in 10.4 (9.6%)	Gmunden Tramway, Austria	1894	
1 in 10.5 (9.549%)	Straßenbahn Mainz, Germany	1884	Located in the Gaustraße
1 in 11 (9.1%)	Allentown light rail line, Pittsburgh, United States	????	
1 in 11 (9.1%)	Saint-Gervais–Vallorcine railway, France	1901	
1 in 11 (9.1%)	J Church line, San Francisco	1917	
1 in 11.13 (9.0%)	BC Forest Discovery Centre, Duncan, B.C., Canada		The steepest incline on a 3 ft narrow-gauge railway in Canada, the BC Forest Discovery Centre is a Forestry and Logging Museum that runs a tourist train, using a combination of steam locomotives and diesel locomotives, usually with trains consisting of 1-3 coaches in length, as well as motor cars.
1 in 11.4 (8.8%)	Cinci Drumuri–Pădurii, Iași Tramways, Iași, Romania		
1 in 11.4 (8.75%)	A and B Loop and NS Line of the Portland Streetcar system, Portland, Oregon, United States		Located in the block of Southwest Harrison Street between 1st Avenue and 2nd Avenue
1 in 11.8 (8.5%)	Stuttgart light rail system, Germany		Steepest gradient in Alexanderstraße on the southern part of line U15.
1 in 12.5 (8%)	Hakone Tozan Line, Japan		
1 in 12.5 (8%)	Trieste-Opicina tramway		Mixed adhesion and rope-hauled operation. The maximum gradient on adhesion is 8% between Vetta Scorcola and Cologna stops. Maximum gradient on the rope-hauled section is 26% between Romagna and S. Anastasio stops.
1 in 12.5 (8.0%)	Appenzell–St. Gallen–Trogen railway, Appenzeller Bahnen, Switzerland		
1 in 12.6 (7.9%)	Uetliberg railway line, Sihltal Zürich Uetliberg Bahn, Switzerland	1875	
1 in 12.7 (7.85%)	Green Line B branch, Boston, Massachusetts, United States		The steepest gradients are near Washington Street station.
1 in 13.7 (7.3%)	Montreux–Lenk im Simmental line, Switzerland		
1 in 14 (7.1%)	Driving Creek Railway, Coromandel, New Zealand		
1 in 14 (7.1%)	Hopton Incline, Cromford and High Peak Railway, England		This incline has only carried passengers, by adhesion, on enthusiast special trains, but is now completely closed.
1 in 14.1 (7.1%)	Erzberg Railway (Erzbergbahn), Austria		Built as a rack railway, adhesion operation only by passenger railbuses, now only museum operation on part of the line.
1 in 14 (7.0%)	Red Marble Grade, Topton, North Carolina.		A 2015 survey lists the 3.5 mile stretch between MP 87 and MP 90.5 at a 4% average grade and says there are isolated stretches approaching 7%. When originally built the ruling grade was 4.2% as listed by southern railway. But due to the fills settling it has drastically changed. This segment of track has always been worked by adhesion. This line is owned by Great Smoky Mountains Railroad and in 2019 is out of service.
1 in 14.2 (7.0%)	Bernina Railway, Switzerland		
1 in 14.2 (7.0%)	MAX Light Rail system, Portland, Oregon, United States		System's ruling gradient of 7.0% is located on the viaduct connecting the Steel Bridge with Southwest 1st Avenue.
1 in 14.2 (7.0%)	SacRT light rail, Sacramento, California, United States		
1 in 15 (6.67%)	Usui Pass, former Shin'etsu Main Line, Japan		
1 in 15 (6.67%)	Former Keihan Keishin Line		
1 in 15 (6.67%)	Toden Arakawa Line (Tokyo Sakura Tram), Japan		
1 in 15.4 (6.5%)	Incline from the Causeway Street Tunnel up to the Lechmere Viaduct on the Green Line (MBTA), Boston, Massachusetts, United States		This incline is commonly believed to be the "steepest grade of tracks in the T system."
1 in 15.9 (6.3%)	Alishan Forest Railway, Taiwan		
1 in 16.4 (6.1%)	Hunsrückbahn, Germany		Built as a rack railway.
1 in 16.4 (6.1%)	Keihan Keishin Line		
1 in 16.6 (6.0%)	Ligne de Cerdagne, France		
1 in 16.6 (6.0%)	Arica, Chile to Bolivia		With 100 m (328.08 ft) radius curves.
1 in 16.6 (6.0%)	Terni–Perugia–Sansepolcro railway (Perugia Sant'Anna branch)		Steepest standard gauge line in Italy
1 in 16.7 (6.0%)	Arosabahn, Switzerland	1910	Rockfall shelter
1 in 17 (5.89%)	Madison Incline, Madison, Indiana, United States		Steepest standard gauge, line haul railroad in North America. Worked as a rack railway until 1868 when the Reuben Wells was built to work the hill by adhesion.
1 in 17.1 (5.88%)	Docklands Light Railway, London, England		On the ramp from the original London and Blackwall Railway viaduct to the tunnel leading to Bank.
1 in 17.5 (5.7%)	Mukilteo, Washington, United States, Boeing Factory Spur		Rail line for delivering parts shipped from overseas to the Boeing Everett Factory.
1 in 17.5 (5.7%)	Canada Line, Vancouver, B.C., Canada		Ruling gradient for the Canada Line for its steepest portion, between Broadway–City Hall station and Olympic Village station.
1 in 18 (5.5%)	Near Alausi, Ecuador on line to Quito		
1 in 18 (5.5%)	Flåmsbanen, Norway		
1 in 18 (5.5%)	Höllentalbahn (Black Forest), Germany		
1 in 19.2 (5.2%)	Hong Kong Tramway, Hong Kong		Along the section of King's Road between the junctions with Kornhill Road and Shau Kei Wan Road/Taikoo Shing Road
1 in 19 (5.3%)	Camden Tram, New South Wales, Australia		This line has been closed for over 50 years.
1 in 19 (5.3%)	Foxfield Railway, Staffordshire, England		This incline is on a preserved colliery railway which briefly carried passengers over this steep section but does not now normally do so.
1 in 19 (5.3%)	Kangra Valley Railway, Himachal Pradesh, India		
1 in 20 (5.0%)	Rapperswil - Samstagern, Südostbahn, Switzerland		
1 in 20 (5.0%)	Murg Valley Railway, Germany		
1 in 20 (5.0%)	Kurobe Gorge Railway, Japan		
1 in 20 (5.0%)	Eizan Electric Railway Kurama Line, Japan		
1 in 20 (5.0%)	Nankai Electric Railway Koya Line, Japan		
1 in 20 (5.0%)	Kobe Electric Railway (Shintetsu) Ao Line and Arima Line, Japan		
1 in 20 (5.0%)	Tateyama Erosion Control Train, Japan		
1 in 20 (5.0%) / 1 in 25 (4.0%)	Matheran Hill Railway, India		Near Mumbai
1 in 21 (4.7%)	Saluda Grade, Saluda, North Carolina, United States		The steepest standard gauge mainline railroad grade in the United States. Worked by adhesion between 1878 and 2001, currently out of service.
1 in 22 (4.5%)	Balsam Mountain Grade, Balsam N.C.		Balsam Mountain, home of highest railroad station east of the Rockies; average grade about 4.0%, max 4.5%. 1 of 2 grades on southern railways former Murphy branch that are +4% grade. Balsam Mountain has seen many runaways. It is still in service operated by the Blue Ridge Southern Railroad (Watco).
1 in 22 (4.5%)	Darjeeling Himalayan Railway, India		
1 in 22 (4.5%)	Big Hill, British Columbia, Canada		Operated from 1884 to 1909 when it was replaced by two spiral tunnels.
1 in 22.5 (4.4%)	Thamshavn Line, Norway		
1 in 23 (4.3%)	Ballochney incline, Ballochney Railway, Scotland		The steepest standard gauge inclines used regularly by passenger trains by adhesion in Britain. Both closed to passengers from 1 May 1930 by the London and North Eastern Railway and since closed completely.
1 in 23 (4.3%)	Causewayend incline, Slamannan Railway, Scotland		The steepest standard gauge inclines used regularly by passenger trains by adhesion in Britain. Both closed to passengers from 1 May 1930 by the London and North Eastern Railway and since closed completely.
1 in 23.5 (4.25%)	Boketu Forest Railway, China	1924	Steepest railway line owned by China Railways
1 in 25 (4.0%)	Cologne–Frankfurt high-speed rail line, Germany		
1 in 25 (4.0%)	Chosica - Galera, Central Railway, Peru		
1 in 25 (4.0%)	Selketalbahn, Germany		
1 in 25 (4.0%)	Cumbres and Toltec Scenic Railroad, Colorado, United States		
1 in 25 (4.0%)	Durango and Silverton Narrow Gauge Railroad, Colorado, United States		
1 in 25 (4.0%)	Sawando to Akagi, Iida Line, Japan		
1 in 25 (4.0%)	Fujikyuko Line, Fuji Kyuko Railway, Japan		
1 in 25 (4.0%)	Batlow branch, New South Wales, Australia	1923	This line has been closed for many years. A popular grade in NSW.
1 in 25 (4.0%)	Newnes branch, New South Wales, Australia		This line has been closed for many decades. The Glowworm Tunnel on its former route is a popular tourist attraction. Used Shay locomotives.
1 in 25 (4.0%)	Oberon branch, New South Wales, Australia	1923-1980	This line has been closed for decades.
1 in 25 (4.0%)	Dorrigo branch, New South Wales, Australia		This line has been closed for decades. There have been several attempts by the Dorrigo Steam Railway and Museum and Glenreagh Mountain Railway to reinstate part of it as a historic/tourist rail line.
1 in 25 (4.0%)	Luxembourg to St Michel-Notre Dame, RER Line B, Paris, France		
1 in 26 (3.85%)	Iquique Railway, Chile		
1 in 26 (3.85%)	Ōu Main Line (Yamagata Shinkansen), Japan		Momentum Grades
1 in 27 (3.7%)	Mersey Railway Tunnel, England		
1 in 27 (3.7%)	Werneth Incline, England		Regular passenger service withdrawn 7 January 1963 and since closed completely.
1 in 27 (3.7%)	Holywell branch line, Wales		Regular passenger service withdrawn 6 September 1954 and since closed completely.
1 in 27 (3.7%)	Mauritius Railways		
1 in 28 (3.6%)	LGV Sud-Est high-speed line, France		
1 in 28.5 (3.5%)	Kyushu Shinkansen, Japan		
1 in 40 (2.25%)	Johnsonville line, New Zealand		
1 in 48 (2.08%)	Liverpool and Manchester Railway Docks	1830	Designed for cable haulage to begin with; replaced by locomotives when technology advanced enough.
1 in 96 (1.04%)	Liverpool and Manchester Railway	1830	On either side of Rainhill level where Rainhill locomotive trials were conducted in 1829.
1 in 880 (0.11%)	Liverpool and Manchester Railway	1830	General ruling gauge overall

== See also ==
- Grade (slope)
- Hillclimbing (railway)
- Lickey Incline, steepest British main-line gradient
- Longest trains
- Mountain railway
- Rack railways
- Ruling gradient
- Spiral (railway)
- Zig zag (railway)
