= Hillclimbing (railway) =

Railway in which a load is carried up an incline

Hillclimbing is a problem faced by railway systems when a load must be carried up an incline. While railways have a great ability to haul very heavy loads, this is only possible when the tracks are fairly level. As soon as the gradients increase, the tonnage that can be hauled is greatly diminished.

== History ==
Early tramways and railways were laid out with very gentle grades because locomotive and horse haulage were so low in tractive effort. The only exception would be with a line that was downhill all the way for loaded traffic. Brakes were very primitive at this early stage.

Where a railway has to cross a range of mountains, it is important to lower the summit as much as possible, as this reduces the steepness of the gradients on either side. This can be done with a summit tunnel or a deep summit cutting.

A summit tunnel can lower the summit even more, and steeper hills result in shorter tunnels. Also, tunnels cost the same no matter how much overburden there is, while cuttings tend to increase in cost with the square of the overburden.

Care had to be taken with summit tunnels in the early days of steam with designs that suffered from problems with smoke and slippery rail.

== Ruling gradient ==
The ruling gradient of a section of railway line between two major stations is the gradient of the steepest stretch. The ruling gradient governs the tonnage of the load that the locomotive can haul reliably.

== Techniques to overcome steep hills ==
Some of the techniques that can be used to overcome steep hills are:

=== Railway layout to reduce gradient ===
- Compensation for curvature: the gradient is slightly eased on sharpest curves so that the tractive effort to pull the train is uniform.
- Horseshoe curves
- Spirals
- Zig zags
- A descending momentum gradient on the approach to a hill allows a train to increase speed before a climb.

=== Track type ===
- Rail surface treatment
- Fell mountain railway system
- Hanscotte centre-rail system
- Rack railway
- Elevators, cable railways, or funicular railways driven by stationary engines (cable haulage up and down inclines)

=== Motive power ===
- Using a booster engine, though this is usually limited to starting the heavy train
- Using two-in-one articulated locomotives such as the Fairlie, Garratt or Mallet locomotive
- Replacing the engine with a more powerful heavier engine for the duration of the steep grade
- Attaching additional banking engine(s)
- Using multiple units to divide the load on tractive wheels
- Geared steam locomotives such as a Shay locomotive
- Atmospheric railway

=== Modifying the load ===
- Dividing the load or splitting the train, which requires a siding at the summit

== See also ==
- Cable car
- Funicular railway
- Grade (slope)
- Lickey Incline
- Mountain railway
- Rack railway
- Ruling gradient
- Slope
- Steepest gradients on adhesion railways
