= Biberegg railway station =

Railway station in Switzerland

Biberegg
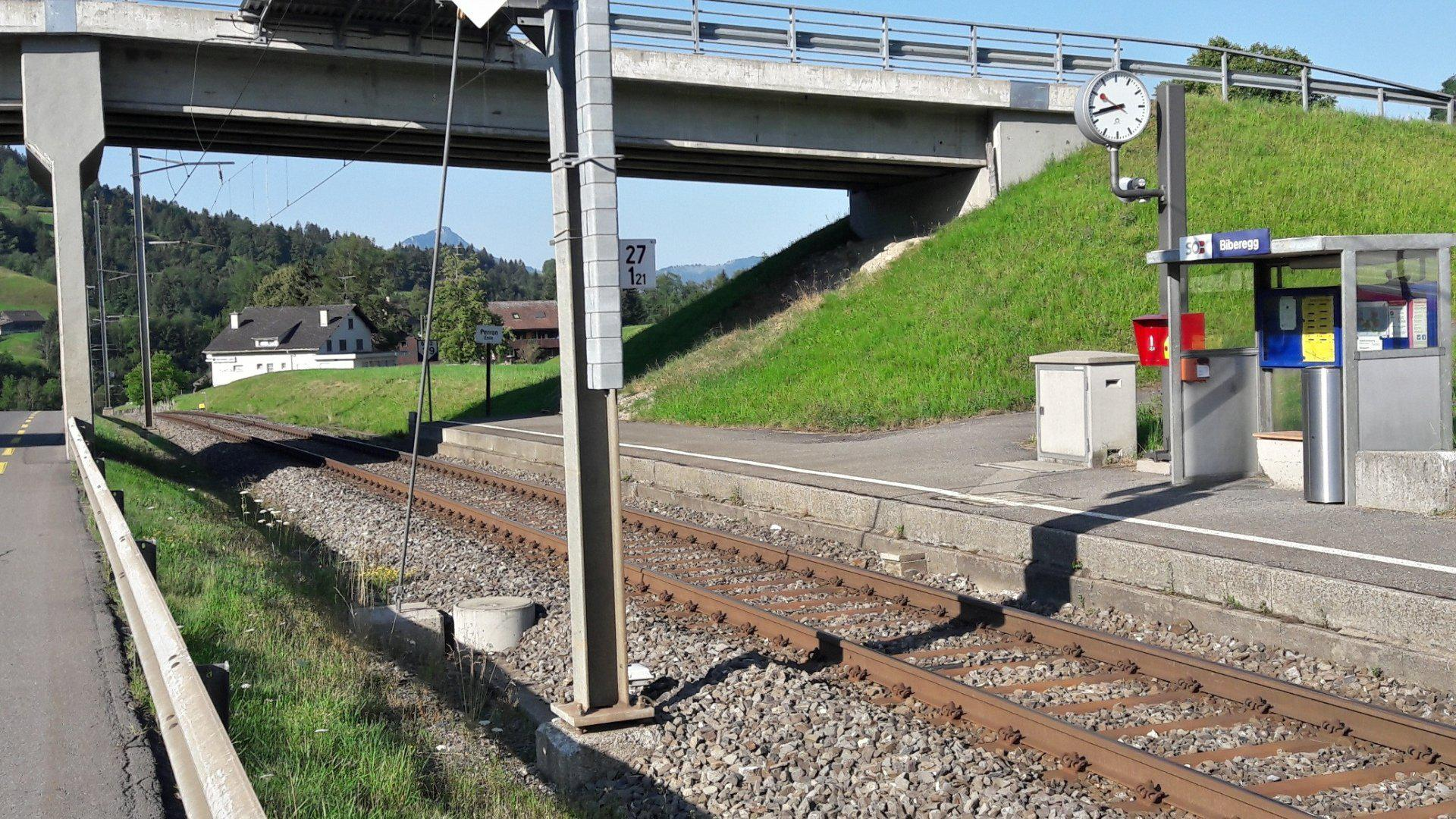
- The station platform in 2018

General information
- Location: Rothenthurm; Switzerland
- Coordinates: 47°05′36″N 8°40′09″E
- Elevation: 936 m (3,071 ft)
- Owner: Südostbahn
- Line: Pfäffikon–Arth-Goldau line
- Train operators: Südostbahn

Services
Preceding station	Lucerne S-Bahn	Following station
Sattel towards Arth-Goldau	S31	Rothenthurm towards Biberbrugg
Location
- Location within Switzerland Location within Canton of Schwyz

Biberegg railway station (German: Bahnhof Biberegg) is a railway station in Rothenthurm, in the Swiss canton of Schwyz. It is an intermediate stop on the standard gauge Pfäffikon–Arth-Goldau line of Südostbahn.

== Services ==
The following services stop at Biberegg:

- Lucerne S-Bahn S31: hourly service between Arth-Goldau and Biberbrugg.
