= Sattel railway station =

Railway station in Sattel, Switzerland

Sattel

General information
- Location: Sattel; Switzerland
- Coordinates: 47°04′54″N 8°38′02″E
- Elevation: 792.8 m (2,601 ft)
- Owner: Südostbahn
- Line: Pfäffikon–Arth-Goldau line
- Platforms: 1
- Tracks: 1
- Train operators: Südostbahn
- Connections: Sattel-Hochstuckli cable car

History
- Opened: 10 December 2023

Services
Preceding station	Lucerne S-Bahn	Following station
Steinerberg towards Arth-Goldau	S31	Biberegg towards Biberbrugg
Location

Sattel railway station (German: Bahnhof Sattel) is a railway station in the municipality of Sattel, in the Swiss canton of Schwyz. It is an intermediate stop on the standard gauge Pfäffikon–Arth-Goldau line of Südostbahn (SOB).

== History ==
The project to replace the former station began in 2022, as Sattel-Aegeri no longer met requirements for accessibility and the Canton of Schwyz's public transport strategy to better align rail and bus services. Construction began in early 2023, with an estimated project cost of 5.9m CHF. The new station opened on 10 December 2023, with Sattel-Aegeri closing permanently on the same day.

== Facilities ==
Sattel railway station has a 170 meter covered platform, along with bicycle storage beneath the main platform.

== Connections ==
The station is in walking distance to the valley station of the Sattel-Hochstuckli cable car to Mostelberg and Hochstuckli skiing area.

== Services ==
As of the December 2023 timetable change, the following service calls at Sattel:

- Lucerne S-Bahn S31: hourly service between Arth-Goldau and Biberbrugg.
