= Südostbahn =

Swiss railway company

Südostbahn (SOB)

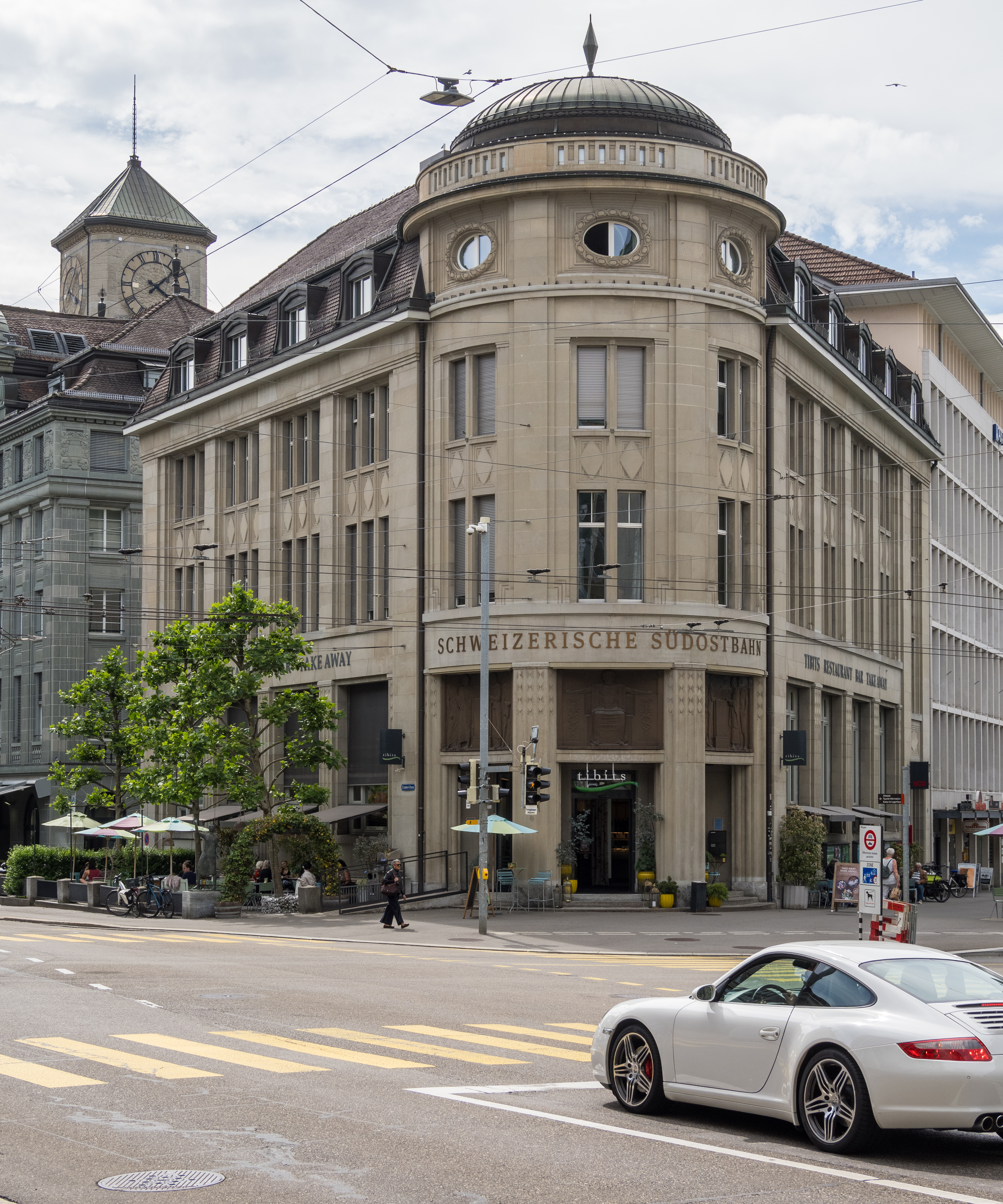
- Head office in St. Gallen
- Native name: Schweizerische Südostbahn AG (German)
- Type: Jointly cantonal and federally owned AG/SA
- Industry: Rail transport
- Founded: 1 January 2001; 25 years ago (retroactive)
- Headquarters: St. Gallen, Switzerland
- Key people: Armin Weber (CEO), Benedikt Würth
- Revenue: ▲CHF68.6958 million (2024)
- Number of employees: 996 (as of 2024)
- Divisions: Passenger
- Website: sob.ch

SOB rail network
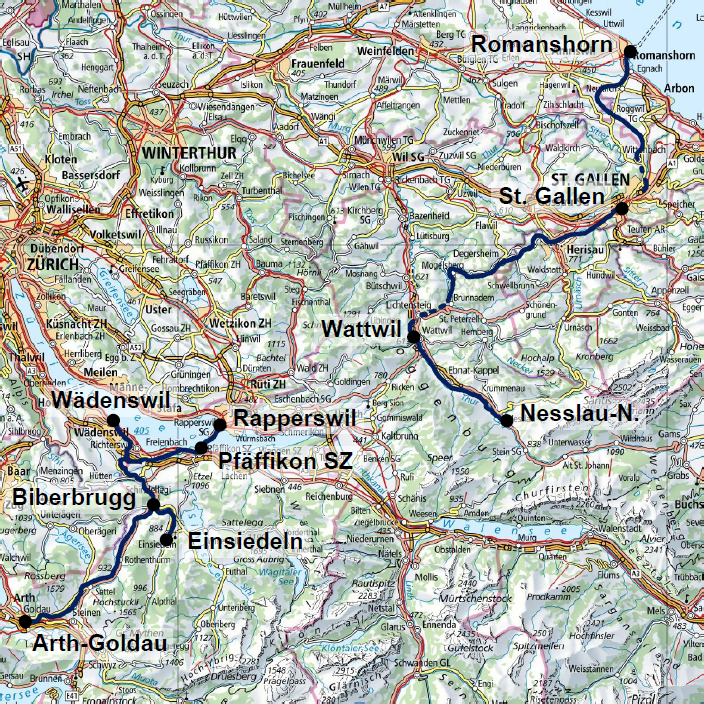
- Südostbahn (SOB) rail network

Overview
- Dates of operation: 1 May 1877–present

Technical
- Track gauge: 1,435 mm (4 ft 8 1/2 in) standard gauge
- Electrification: 100% 15 kV, 16.7 Hz Overhead line
- Length: 111 km (69.0 mi)

The Schweizerische Südostbahn AG (German, lit. 'South-Eastern Railway'), commonly abbreviated to SOB, is a Swiss railway company, and a 1,435 mm (4 ft 8 1/2 in) standard gauge network in Central and Eastern Switzerland. It resulted from the merger of the original SOB with the Bodensee–Toggenburg railway (BT) at the end of 2001.

The Schweizerische Südostbahn AG (Swiss South-Eastern Railway SA) is a small private railway jointly owned by the cantonal and federal governments as an Aktiengesellschaft (AG).

The Südostbahn is one of the three major standard gauge railway operators im Switzerland, the other two being Swiss Federal Railways and BLS AG.

== Network ==
The rail network of the Südostbahn (SOB) consists of that formerly owned by BT in northeast Switzerland (between Lake Constance and Toggenburg):

- Romanshorn–St. Gallen St. Fiden line,
- St. Gallen–Herisau–Degersheim–Wattwil line, and
- (Wattwil–)Ebnat-Kappel–Krummenau–Nesslau-Neu Sankt Johann line,

and that previously owned by the original SOB located predominantly in Central Switzerland:

- Rapperswil–Pfäffikon SZ line,
- Pfäffikon SZ–Freienbach SOB–Wollerau–Samstagern–Schindellegi-Feusisberg–Biberbrugg–Altmatt–Rothenthurm–Biberegg–Sattel-Aegeri–Steinerberg–Arth-Goldau line, and
- Einsiedeln–Biberbrugg–Schindellegi-Feusisberg–Samstagern–Wädenswil line.

Since 2006, SOB also owns Wattwil station and the railway from Wattwil to Ebnat-Kappel, which until then belonged to SBB CFF FFS. The railway stations of Romanshorn, St. Gallen, and Pfäffikon SZ, and the railway tracks between St. Gallen St. Fiden–St. Gallen, Wattwil (except railway station)–Rapperswil, and Arth-Goldau–Luzern are owned by Swiss Federal Railways, but are used by SOB for its services.

In total, the SOB network measures 128.9 kilometres (80.1 miles), and comprises the following lines:

- Romanshorn – St. Gallen St. Fiden (19.1 kilometres (11.9 miles))
- St. Gallen – Wattwil – Nesslau-Neu St. Johann (44.5 kilometres (27.7 miles))
- Rapperswil – Pfäffikon SZ (Seedamm) (4 kilometres (2.5 miles))
- Pfäffikon SZ – Arth-Goldau (34.6 kilometres (21.5 miles), including 6.1 kilometres (3.8 miles) common with Wädenswil–Einsiedeln)
- Wädenswil – Einsiedeln (16.7 kilometres (10.4 miles))

The adhesion railway network spreads over mountainous terrain, with a maximum slope of 50‰ (5 %) between Wädenswil/Pfäffikon SZ and Biberbrugg, and between Rothenthurm and Arth-Goldau. The lowest altitude on the SOB network is found at Romanshorn (399 metres (1,309 ft) a.s.l.), and the highest at Biberegg (933 metres (3,061 ft) a.s.l.), between Rothenthurm and Sattel-Aegeri. The highest elevation on the section between Nesslau-Neu St. Johann and St. Gallen is reached near Degersheim (798.7 metres (2,620 ft) a.s.l.).

The network is mostly a single-track railway, with intermittent double-tracks (9.84 kilometres (6.11 mi) in total) present in sections where trains cross regularly. The entire network is electrified since 1939.

== Infrastructure ==
The direct connection from Lake Constance (Bodensee) via Lake Zurich (Zürichsee) towards Lake Lucerne (Vierwaldstättersee), which follows the Alpine foothills, was achieved by numerous civil engineering works. These consist of a series of viaducts and tunnels. Engineering structures account for one eighth of the total SOB rail network. They comprise:

- 177 bridges spanning a total of 4.2 kilometres (2.6 miles), and
- 19 tunnels through 8.5 kilometres (5.3 miles) of mountains.

One of the viaducts, the 99 metres (325 ft) high and 365 metres (1,198 ft) long Sitter Viaduct (SOB) near St. Gallen Haggen, is the highest railway bridge in Switzerland. It is also the longest bridge on the SOB network and was built between 1908 and 1910. Other notable viaducts are the Glatttal Viaduct (296 metres (971 ft) long, 34 metres (112 ft) high) near Herisau station, and the Wissbach Viaduct (289.5 metres (950 ft) long, 63 metres (207 ft) high) between Degersheim and Schachen. Many bridges of the SOB network were constructed by BT.

The longest tunnel on the SOB network is the 3.5 kilometres (2.2 mi) long Wasserfluh Tunnel between Brunnadern-Neckertal and Lichtensteig, with 10.4‰ grades. The tunnel was constructed between 1905 and 1910. The second longest tunnel is the Bruggwald Tunnel between St. Gallen St. Fiden and Wittenbach, having a length of 1.7 kilometres (1.1 mi) and a slope of 12‰. It was built between 1907 and 1910. Most tunnels of the SOB network belonged to BT previously. The 8.6 kilometres (5.3 mi) long Ricken Tunnel on the Uznach–Wattwil line, used by the SOB operated Voralpen Express and S4 service of St. Gallen S-Bahn, belongs to Swiss Federal Railways (SBB CFF FFS).

== Rolling stock ==
In the 1990s, the former Südostbahn (SOB) ordered four two-piece NPZ (Neuer Pendelzug; English: "new push-pull train") sets (RBDe 566 + ABt), which were delivered from the first production series in 1995, bearing numbers RBDe 566 400-403. Initially, the SOB opted not to convert any intermediate cars for use with these trainsets. Thus, the SOB DVTs differed from those of the SBB CFF FFS by the addition of a first class compartment. The motor coaches of the NPZ sets, however, were identical to those of SBB CFF FFS. The SOB later converted several intermediate cars to elongate their trainsets (three-/four-car sets).

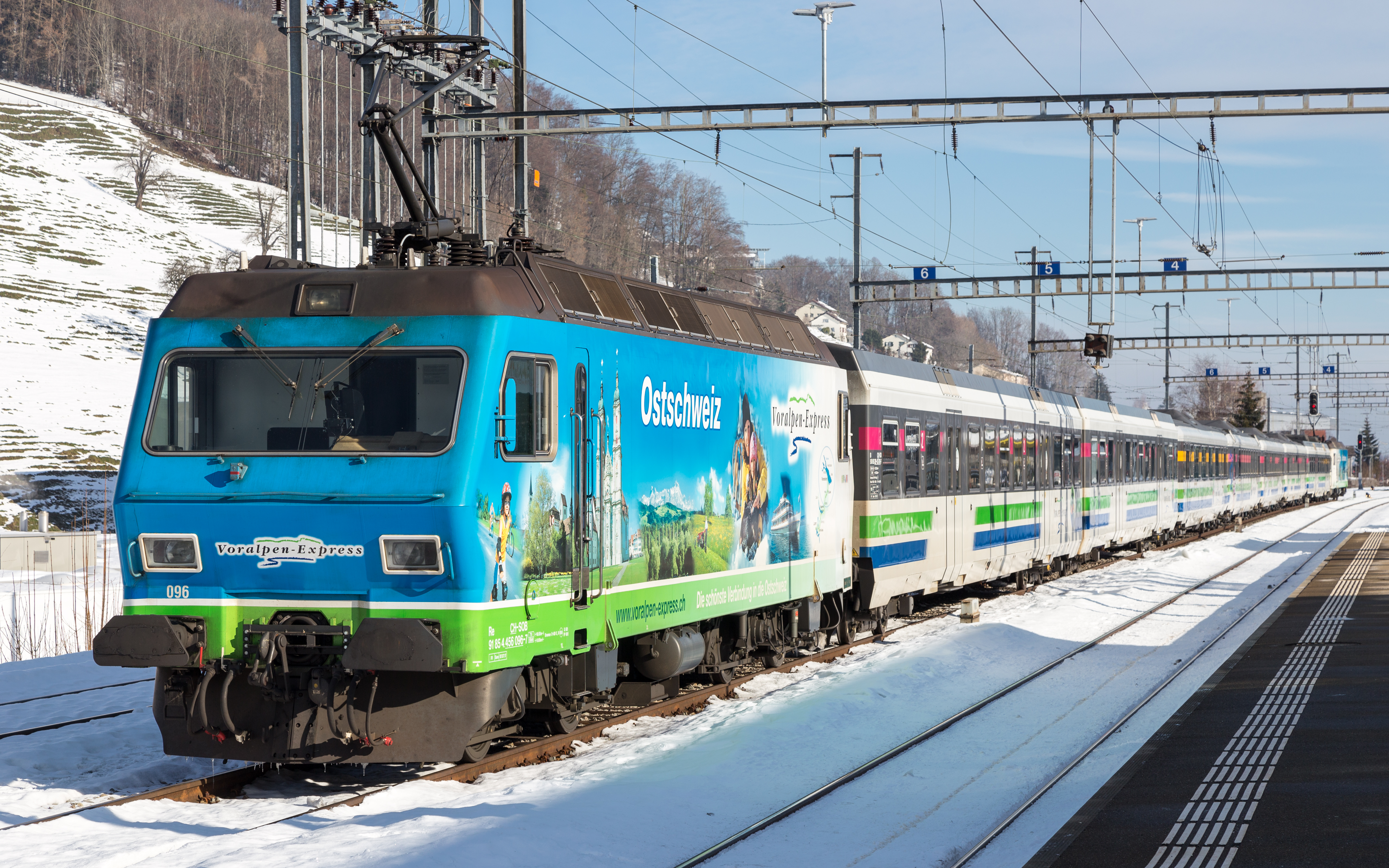
Re 456 with Voralpen-Express in Herisau

The NPZ first class control cars (ABt) existed for the two types of RBDe 566 that SOB owned at that time (RBDe 566 071-076 ex BT and RBDe 566 077-080 ex original SOB of the type also used by SBB CFF FFS). Until 2019, nine second class control cars (BDt) were used for the Voralpen-Express sets with Re 456, Re 446 or Re 420 (the latter occasionally leased from SBB-CFF-FFS) locomotives. After the merger of the original SOB with BT, the four NPZ sets were repainted in 2003 in the livery of the new SOB, with the sides of the vehicles painted light and dark gray, and the nose and border between side and roof painted red. They operated throughout the SOB network as RBDe 566 077-080.

The NPZ sets were later replaced by Stadler FLIRT EMUs (four-car-sets), delivered between 2007 and 2013 (RABe 526 041-526 063). The latter were painted in the most recent SOB livery: silver, with red window band, and light gray doors. Additional FLIRT-III four-car-sets were delivered between 2019 and 2021 (RABe 526 001-526 006). The FLIRT/FLIRT-III sets operate as S-Bahn service, but also as extension units during peak-hours on InterRegio lines, i.e., for the named trains Voralpen-Express/Treno Gottardo/Aare Linth, for which new copper-red painted Traverso eight-car EMU sets (RABe 526 101/201-526 117/217) started operations between 2019 and 2021. Some of the FLIRT/FLIRT-III sets are named after mountain peaks along SOB operated lines. The names are indicated near the ends of the trainsets.

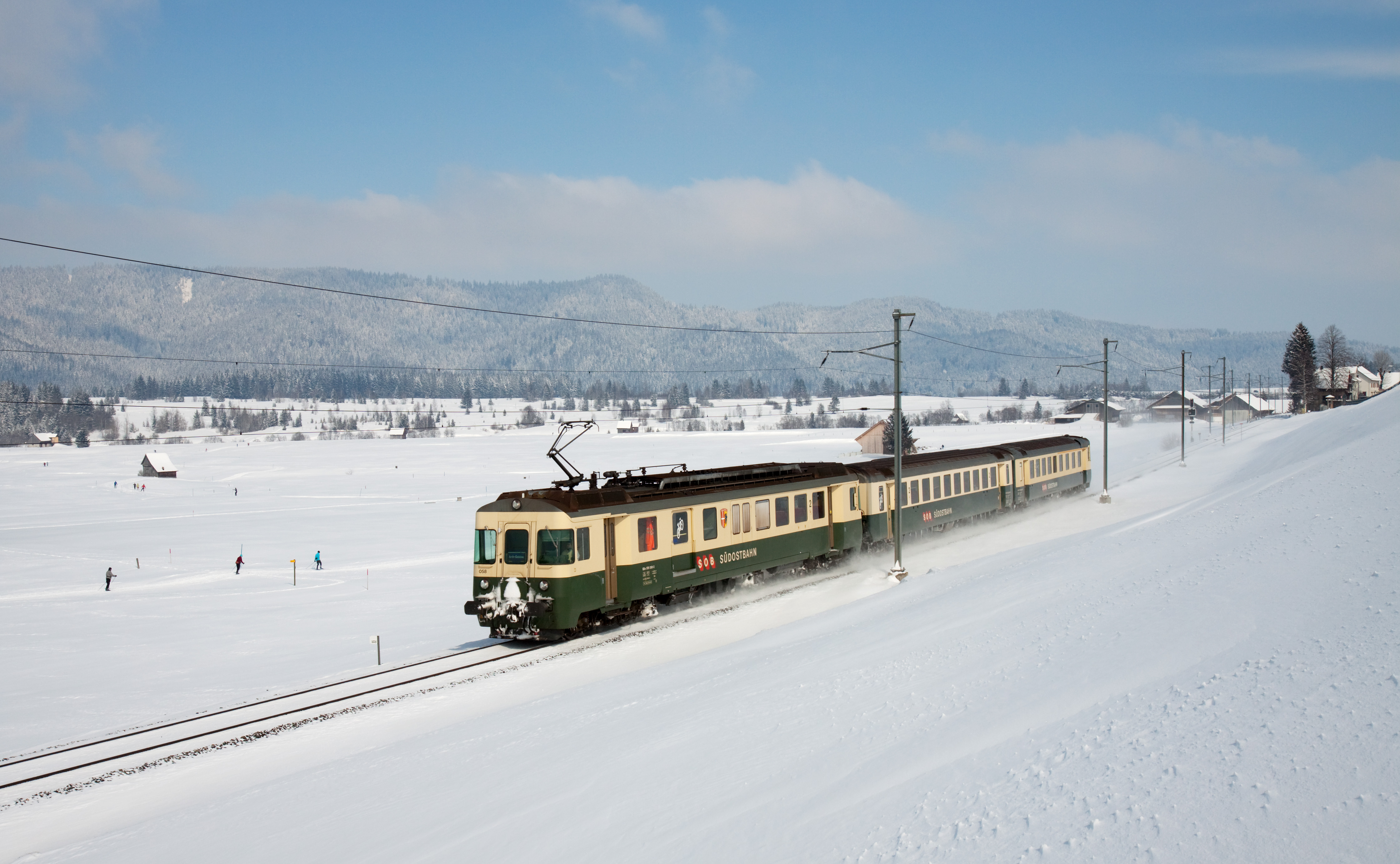
Old generation rolling stock (until 2010): BDe 4/4 with a push-pull train, between Altmatt and Rothenthurm

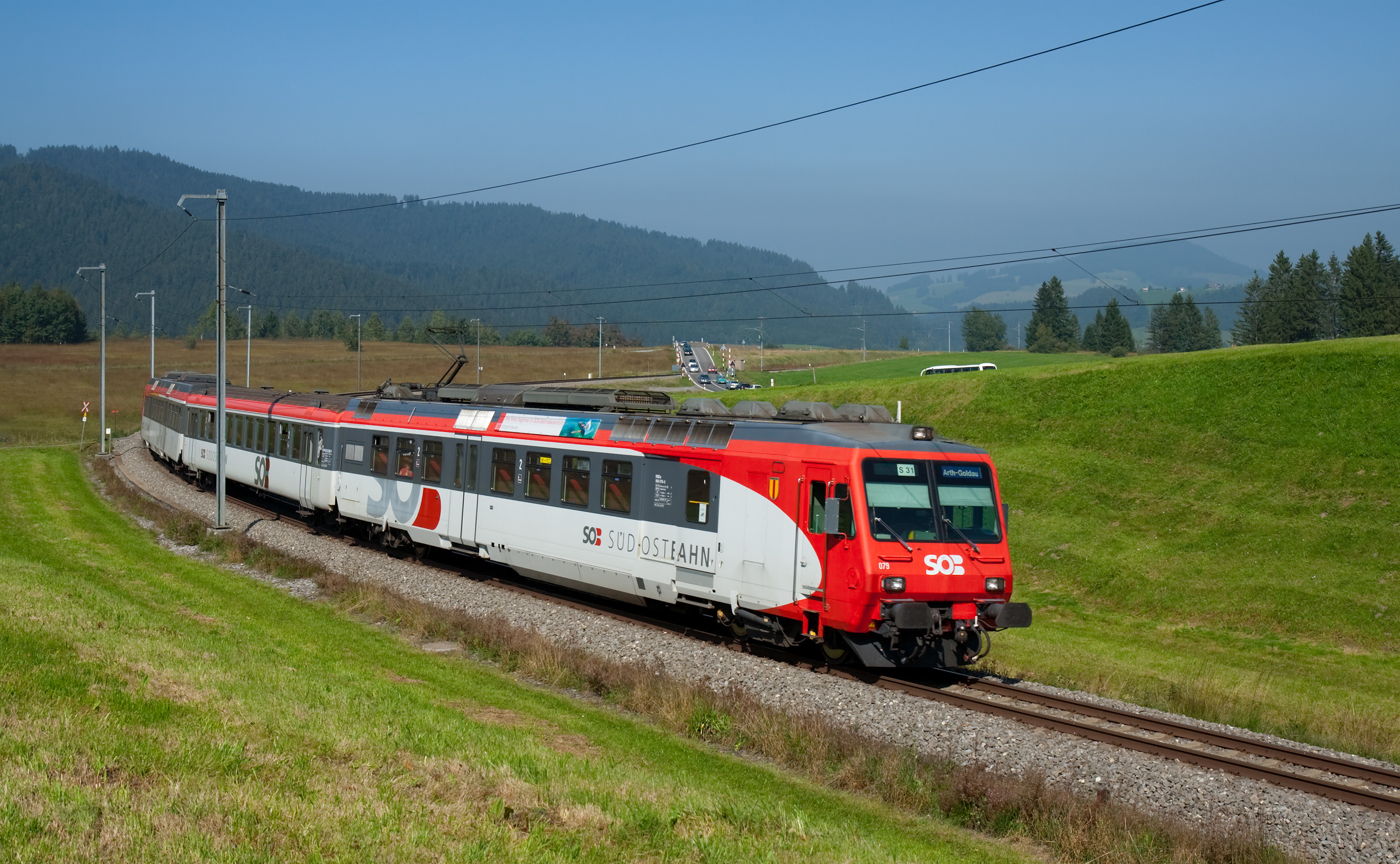
SOB NPZ set (RBDe 566 motor coach, coach, and driving trailer) with former SOB livery

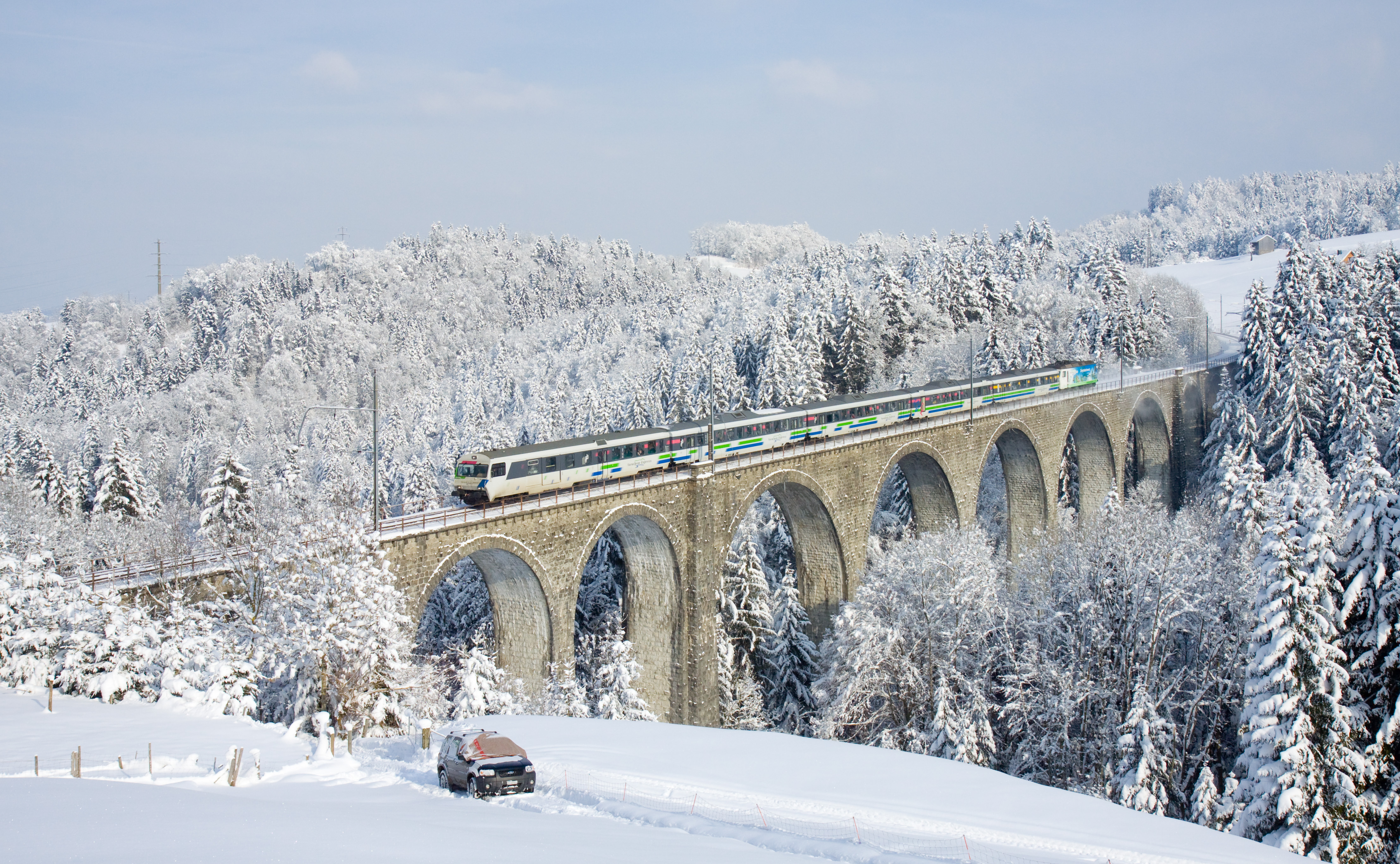
Historic Voralpen Express push-pull trainset (used until 2019) on Wissbach Viaduct near Degersheim

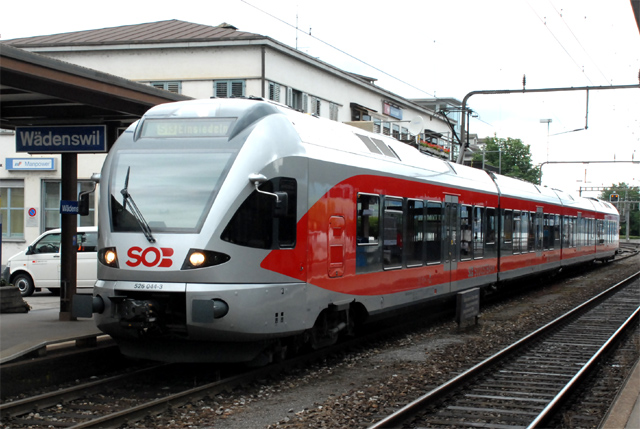
SOB RABe 526 (Series 1/2) S-Bahn set at Wädenswil station

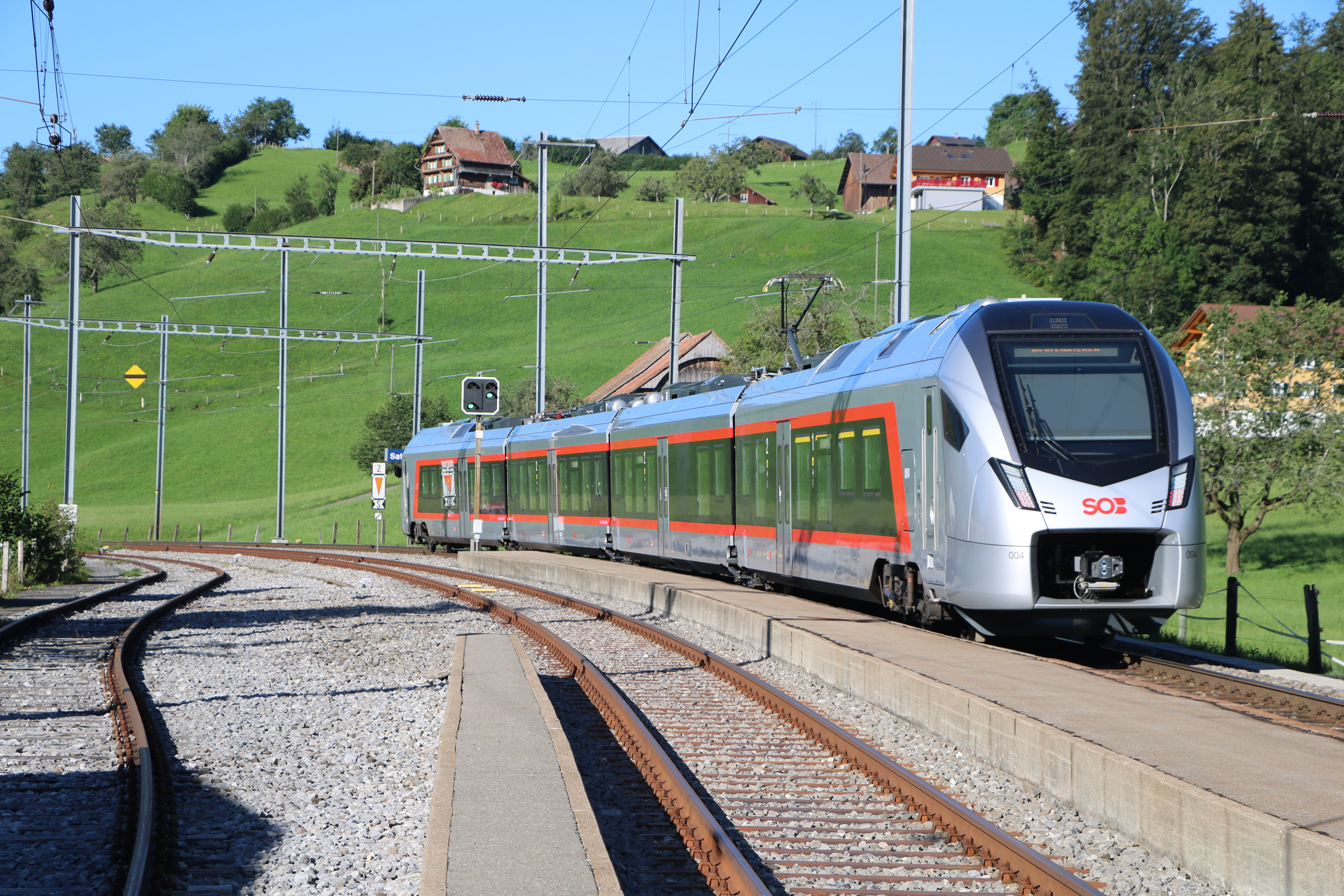
SOB RABe 526 (Series 3) S-Bahn set at Sattel-Aegeri station

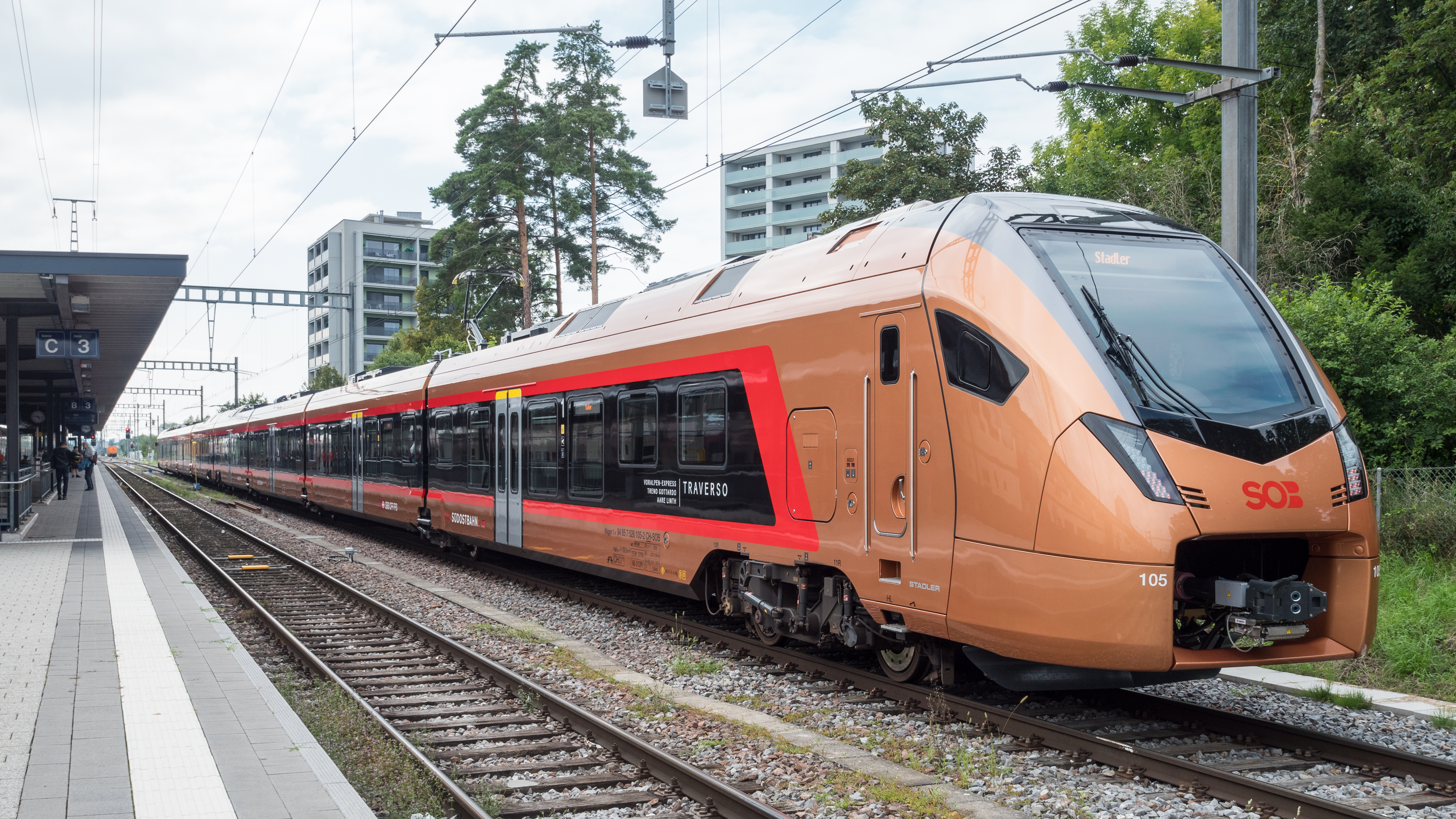
New SOB RABe 526 "Traverso" operating since 2019

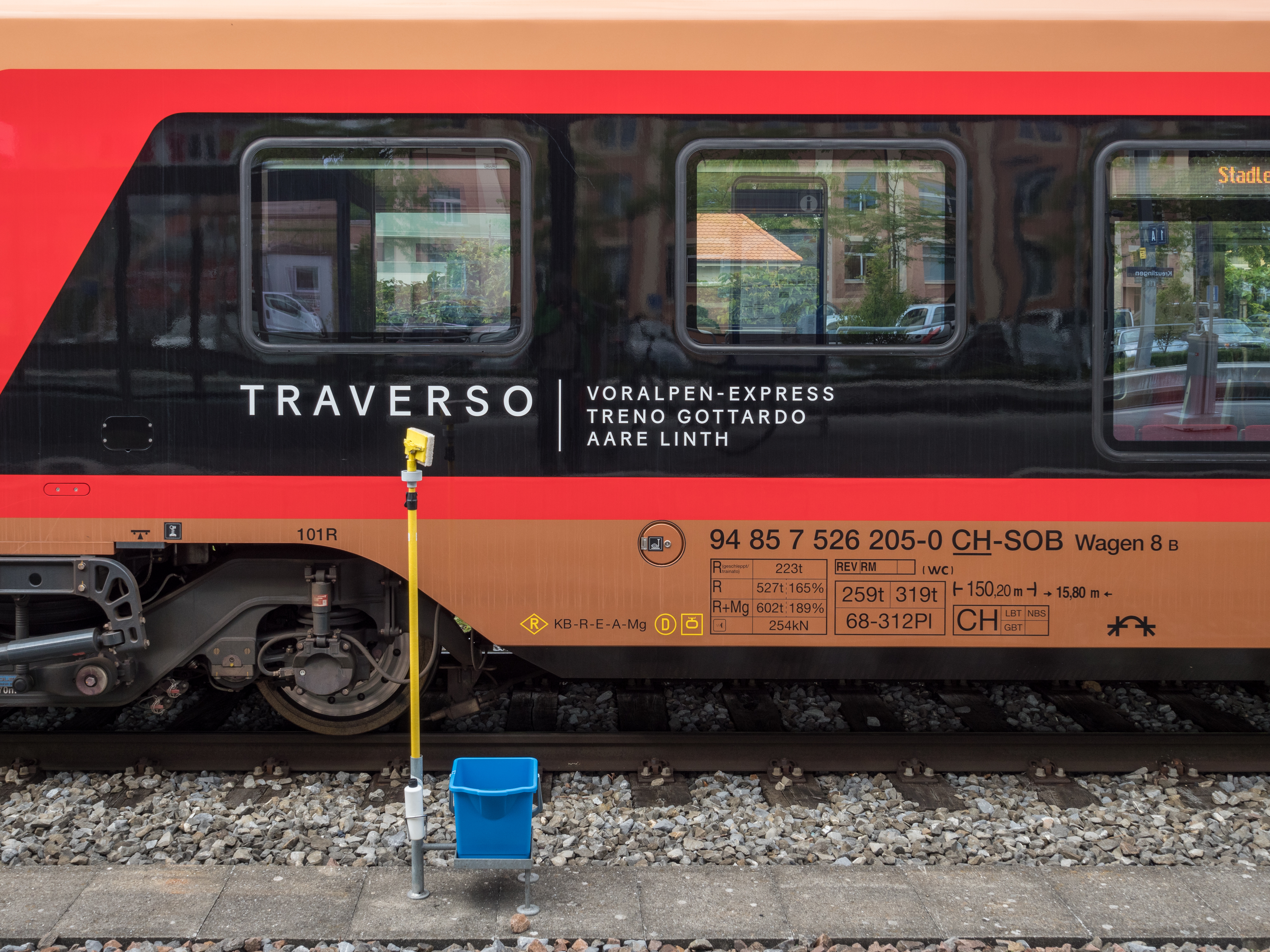
New SOB RABe 526 "Traverso" operating since 2019

=== Naming ===
In Switzerland, it is common customs to name EMUs (e.g. SBB RABe 501, RABDe 500, RABe 514) and locomotives (e.g. SBB Ae 6/6, Re 6/6, Re 450, Re 460). Several of Südostbahn's four-car EMUs are named after Swiss mountains. The name, along with a line drawing of the mountain's crest line and its highest elevation in meters above sea level (Meter über Meer, m.ü.M.), are indicated near the ends of the trainset. The table below summarizes all named SOB trainsets:

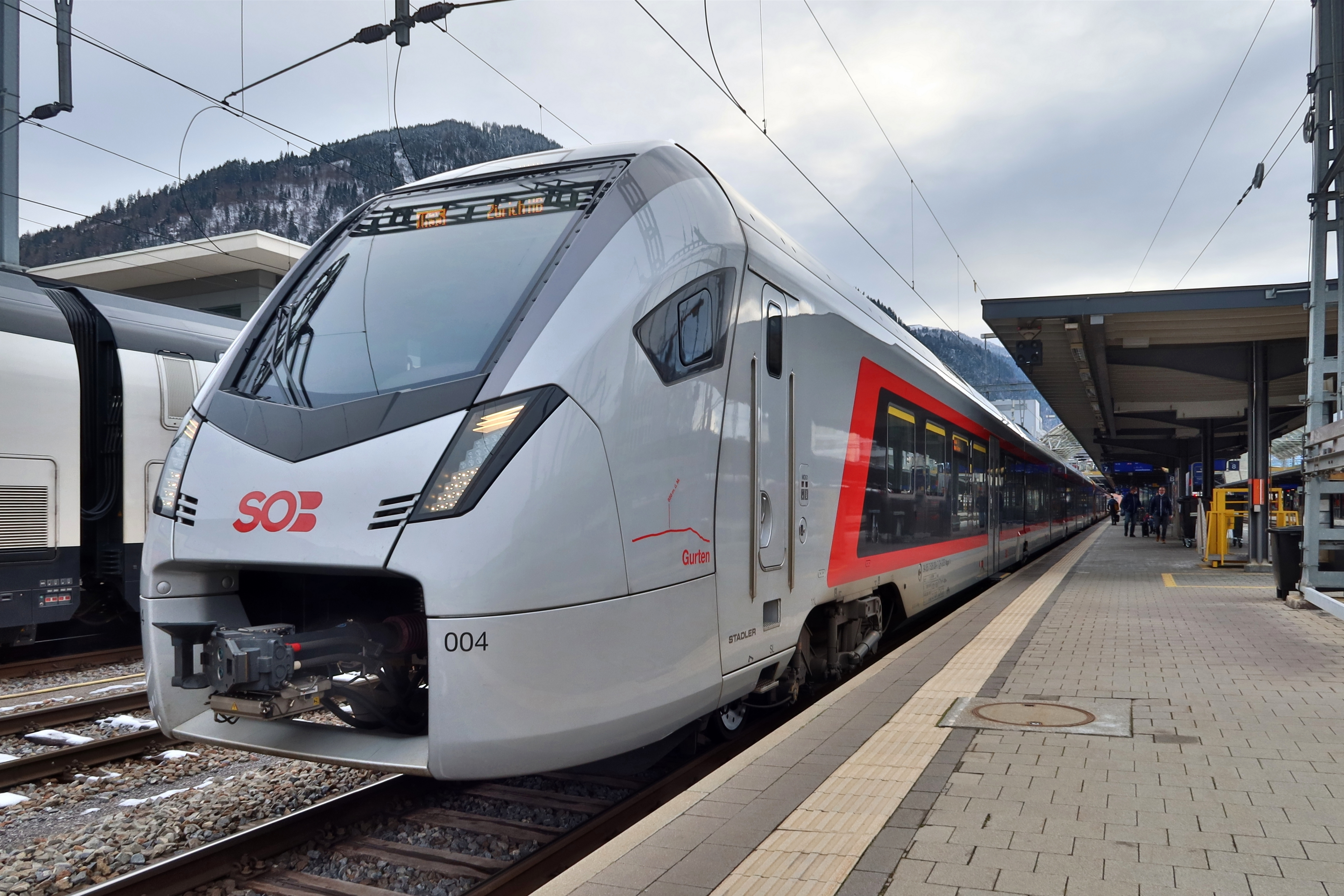
RABe 526 004-7 is named Gurten

RABe 526 Series 1 (TSI numbers 94 85 7 526 XXX-X CH-SOB)
№	Name	№	Name	№	Name	№	Name
526 041-9	Mythen	526 044-3	Morgartenberg	526 047-6	Rossberg	526 050-0	Alvier
526 042-7	Chrüzberg	526 045-0	Federispitz	526 048-4	Kronberg	526 051-8	Zimmerberg
526 043-5	Churfirsten	526 046-8	Ringelspitz	526 049-2	Hochstuckli		

RABe 526 Series 2 (TSI numbers 94 85 7 526 XXX-X CH-SOB)
№	Name	№	Name	№	Name	№	Name
526 052-6	Schnabelsberg	526 055-9	Mürtschenstock	526 058-3	Speer	526 061-7	Rigi Kulm
526 053-4	Etzel	526 056-7	Pizol	526 059-1	St. Anton	526 062-5	Chapfenberg
526 054-2	Hoher Kasten	526 057-5	Gonzen	526 060-9	Hundwiler Höhi	526 063-3	Alpstein

RABe 526 Series 3 (TSI numbers 94 85 7 526 XXX-X CH-SOB)
№	Name	№	Name	№	Name	№	Name
526 001-3	Bachtel	526 005-4	Pilatus	526 009-6	Sissacherflue	526 013-8	Vilan
526 002-1	Calanda	526 006-2	Gitschen	526 010-4	Tödi		
526 003-9	Bristen	526 007-0	Pizzo di Claro	526 011-2	Hirzli		
526 004-7	Gurten	526 008-8	Vrenelisgärtli	526 012-0	Kuegrat		

== Services ==
=== InterRegio ===
Südostbahn (SOB) operates InterRegio (IR) services as named trains Voralpen-Express, Treno Gottardo, and Aare Linth. Due to the clock-face scheduling, the Swiss rail network offers passengers timely connections at most railway stations. Since 2018, most InterRegio lines in Switzerland are numbered and color-coded for more clarity.

==== Voralpen-Express ====
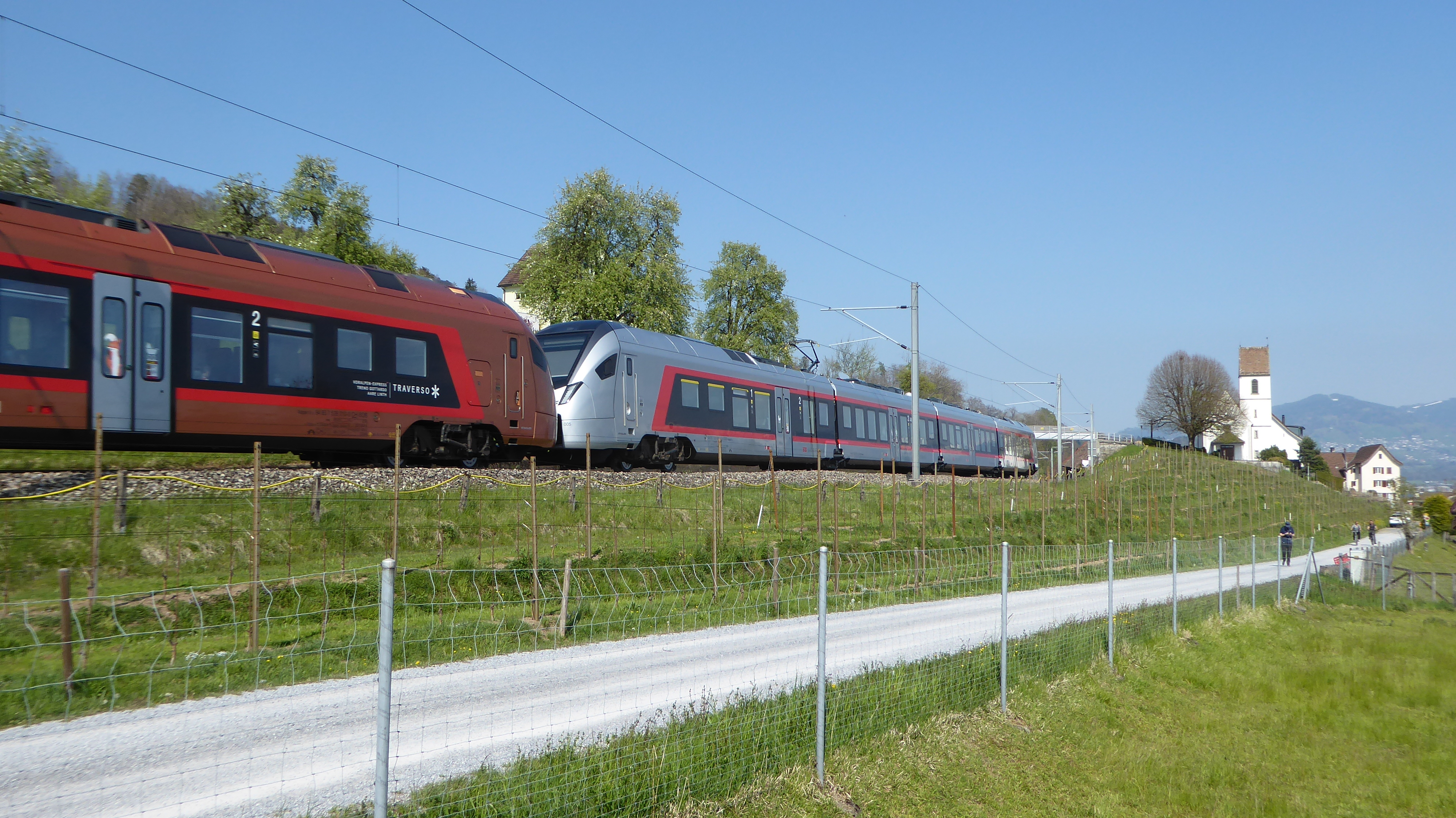
SOB Voralpen-Express at Bollingen

From 1992 to 2013, Voralpen-Express (English: "Prealps Express") was jointly operated with the Swiss Federal Railways (SBB CFF FFS), and it continued as a regional train between St. Gallen and Romanshorn. It is since operated solely by SOB, and the trains turn around in St. Gallen. Between 2013 and 2019, Voralpen-Express ran under its own train category (VAE). It is now again classified as InterRegio (unnumbered) after it was briefly categorized as Panorama Express (PE). The name Voralpen-Express is still indicated on platform displays and mentioned during train departure announcements at the platform.

IR Voralpen-Express: Luzern – St. Gallen

Luzern – Luzern Verkehrshaus – Meggen Zentrum – Küssnacht am Rigi – Arth-Goldau – Rothenthurm – Biberbrugg – Pfäffikon SZ – Rapperswil – Uznach – Wattwil – Herisau – St. Gallen

Voralpen-Express runs mainly on tracks of the SOB network but uses tracks owned by Swiss Federal Railways between Lucerne and Arth-Goldau, and between Rapperswil and Wattwil (including the 8.6 kilometres (5.3 mi) long Ricken Tunnel on the Uznach–Wattwil line).

==== Treno Gottardo ====
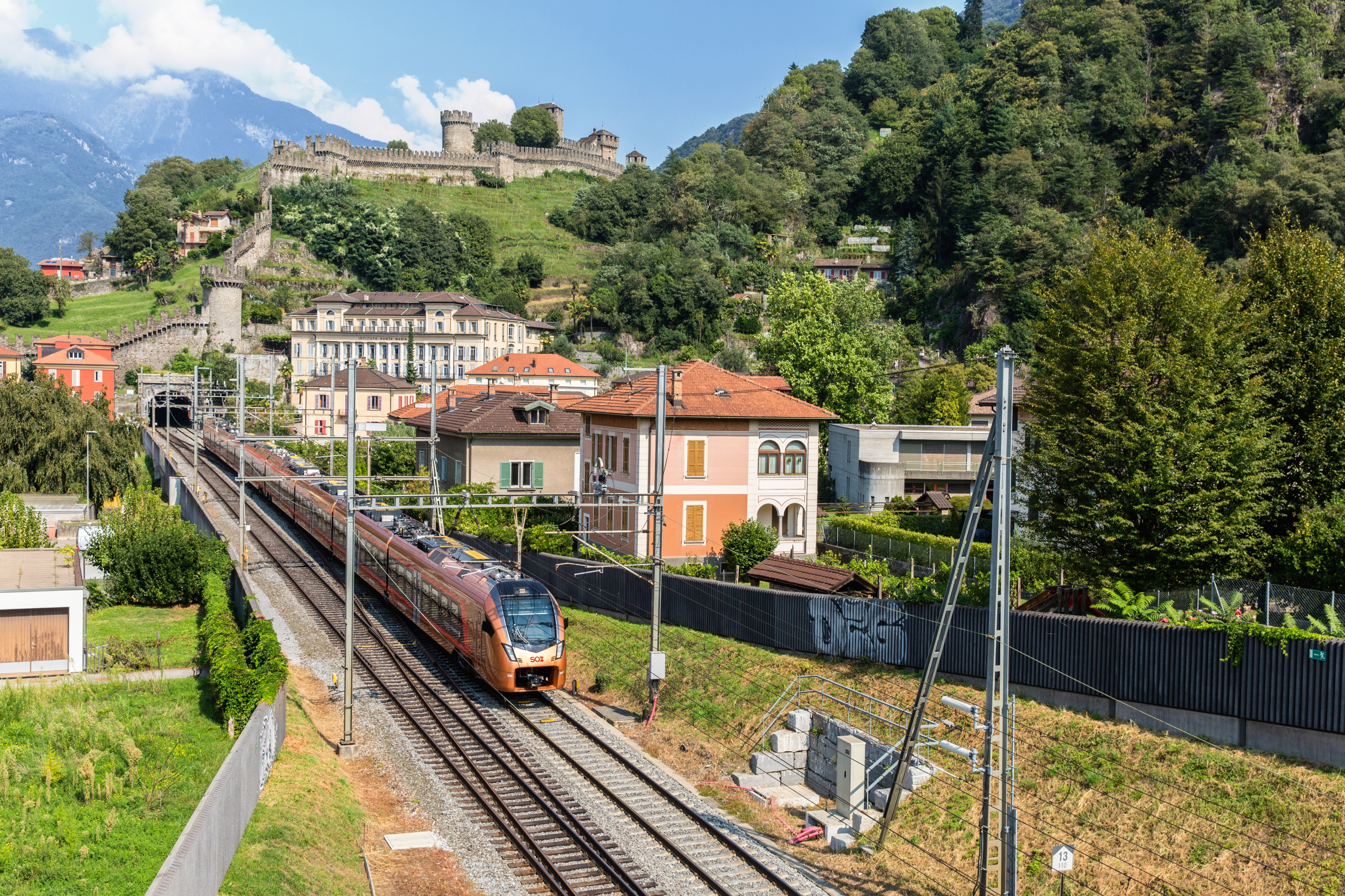
SOB/SBB CFF FFS Treno Gottardo on the Gotthard Railway (here at Bellinzona)

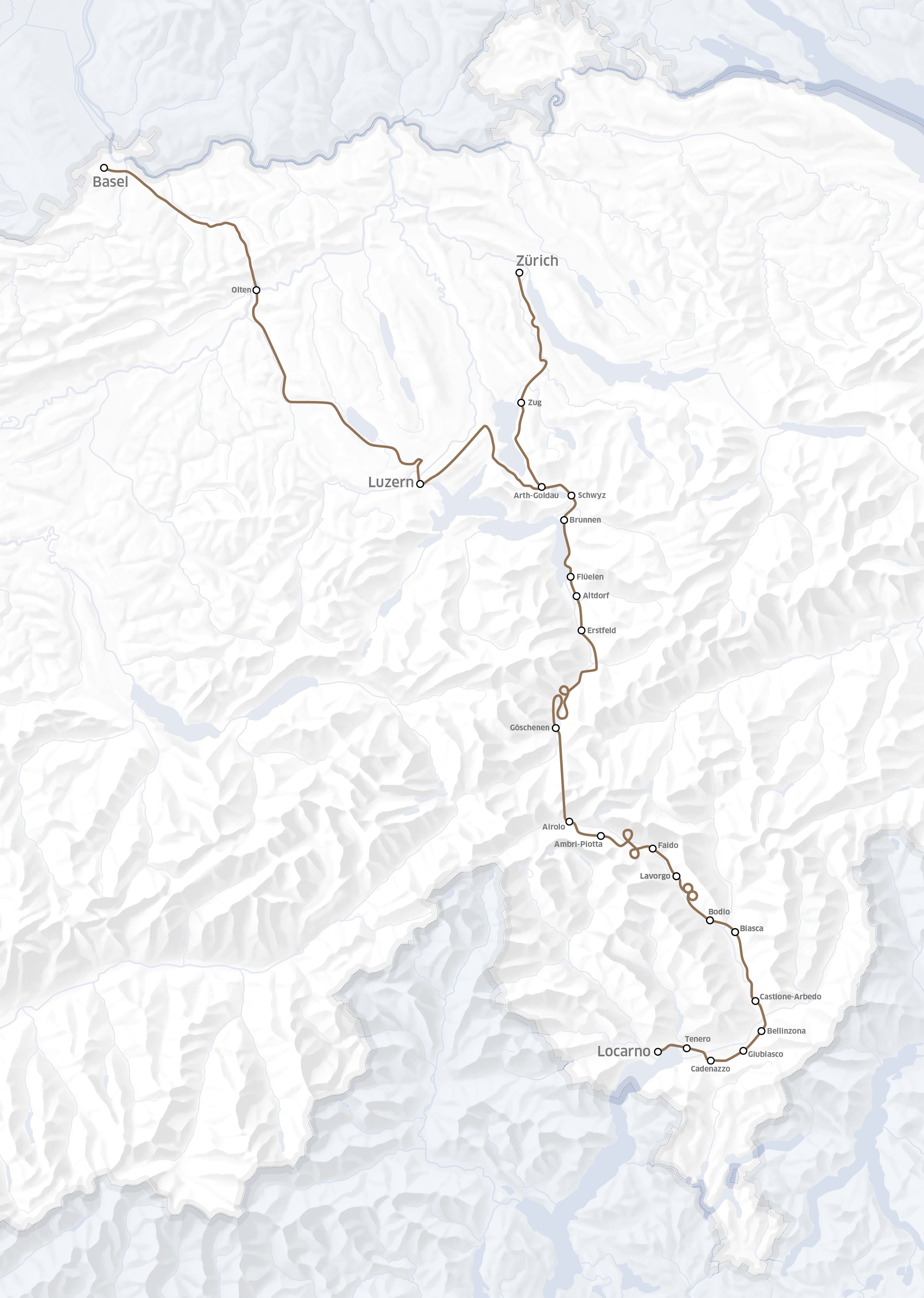
Treno Gottardo routes across the Swiss Alps

Treno Gottardo (Italian for "Gotthard train") is jointly operated by SOB and SBB CFF FFS and runs entirely on the network owned by the latter. It connects the city of Locarno, in the Italian speaking part of Switzerland, alternately with the cities of Basel and Zurich, both located in the German speaking part of the country. Trains to/from Basel reverse direction at Lucerne (dead-end station). It was launched in December 2020, but trains turned around at Bellinzona until spring 2021 due to construction work between Bellinzona and Locarno at that time.

Basel SBB – Locarno

Basel SBB – Olten – Luzern – Arth-Goldau – Schwyz – Brunnen – Flüelen – Erstfeld – Göschenen – Airolo – Ambri-Piotta – Faido – Lavorgo – Bodio TI – Biasca – Castione-Arbedo – Bellinzona – Cadenazzo – Tenero – Locarno

Zürich HB – Locarno

Zürich HB – Zug – Arth-Goldau – Schwyz – Brunnen – Flüelen – Erstfeld – Göschenen – Airolo – Ambri-Piotta – Faido – Lavorgo – Bodio TI – Biasca – Castione-Arbedo – Bellinzona – Cadenazzo – Tenero – Locarno

Treno Gottardo follows the scenic route of the Gotthard Railway. This "old route" crosses the Alps through the ca. 15 kilometres (9.3 mi) long Gotthard Tunnel between Göschenen (1,106 metres (3,629 ft) a.s.l.) and Airolo (1,142 metres (3,747 ft) a.s.l.). It uses a series of spiral loops and horseshoe curves (partly in tunnels) to quickly gain altitude, or to lose altitude on the other side of the tunnel, respectively. All InterCity and EuroCity trains instead use the 57.09 kilometres (35.47 mi) long Gotthard Base Tunnel since its opening in 2016.

==== Aare Linth ====
The named train Aare Linth was launched in December 2021. It connects Chur, the capital of Canton Grisons, with the Swiss capital of Bern. The trains reverse direction at Zurich mainstation (Zürich HB), which is a cul-de-sac. The train is named after the Aare and Linth rivers, which it follows/crosses on its journey. Aare Linth is operated by SOB in cooperation with SBB CFF FFS; it runs entirely on the Swiss Federal Railways network. Stadler "Traverso" trainsets operate on this InterRegio line except during rush hour, when higher-capacity rolling stock of SBB CFF FFS is used.

Bern – Chur

Bern – Burgdorf – Herzogenbuchsee – Langenthal – Olten – Zürich Altstetten – Zürich HB – Thalwil – Wädenswil – Pfäffikon SZ – Siebnen-Wangen – Ziegelbrücke – Unterterzen – Walenstadt – Sargans – Bad Ragaz – Maienfeld – Landquart – Chur

==== Alpenrhein-Express ====
In December 2024, the new named train Alpenrhein-Express began operations using Stadler "Traverso" EMUs. It connects Chur with St. Gallen. The train is named after the Alpine Rhine (Alpenrhein), a portion of the Rhine. The Alpenrhein-Express runs mainly over the Chur–Rorschach railway line of Swiss Federal Railways, which follows the Alpine Rhine. This line was upgraded to dual tracks prior to the opening of the service, allowing for a half-hourly InterRegio service. The Alpenrhein-Express operates hourly, while another IR13 service of Swiss Federal Railways operates in between. The latter run between Sargans via St.Gallen to Zurich. The same trainsets used for the Alpenrhein-Express continue as S81 service of St. Gallen S-Bahn (see below), providing hourly direct services between Chur and Appenzell Ausserrhoden's capital Herisau.

St. Gallen – Chur

St. Gallen – Rorschach – St. Margrethen – Heerbrugg – Altstätten SG – Buchs SG – Sargans – Bad Ragaz – Maienfeld – Landquart – Chur

=== S-Bahn ===
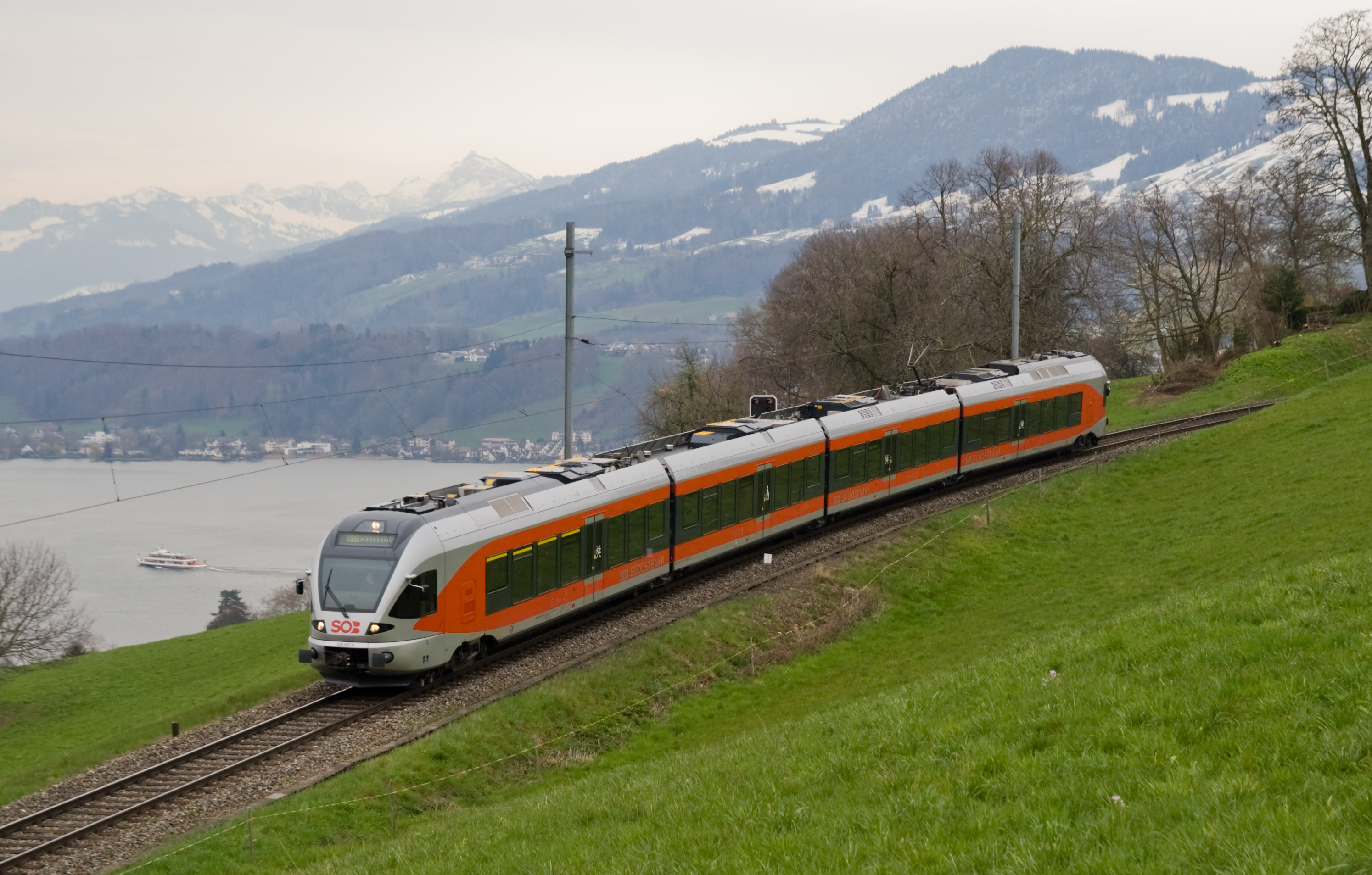
S13 of Zurich S-Bahn descending towards Wädenswil

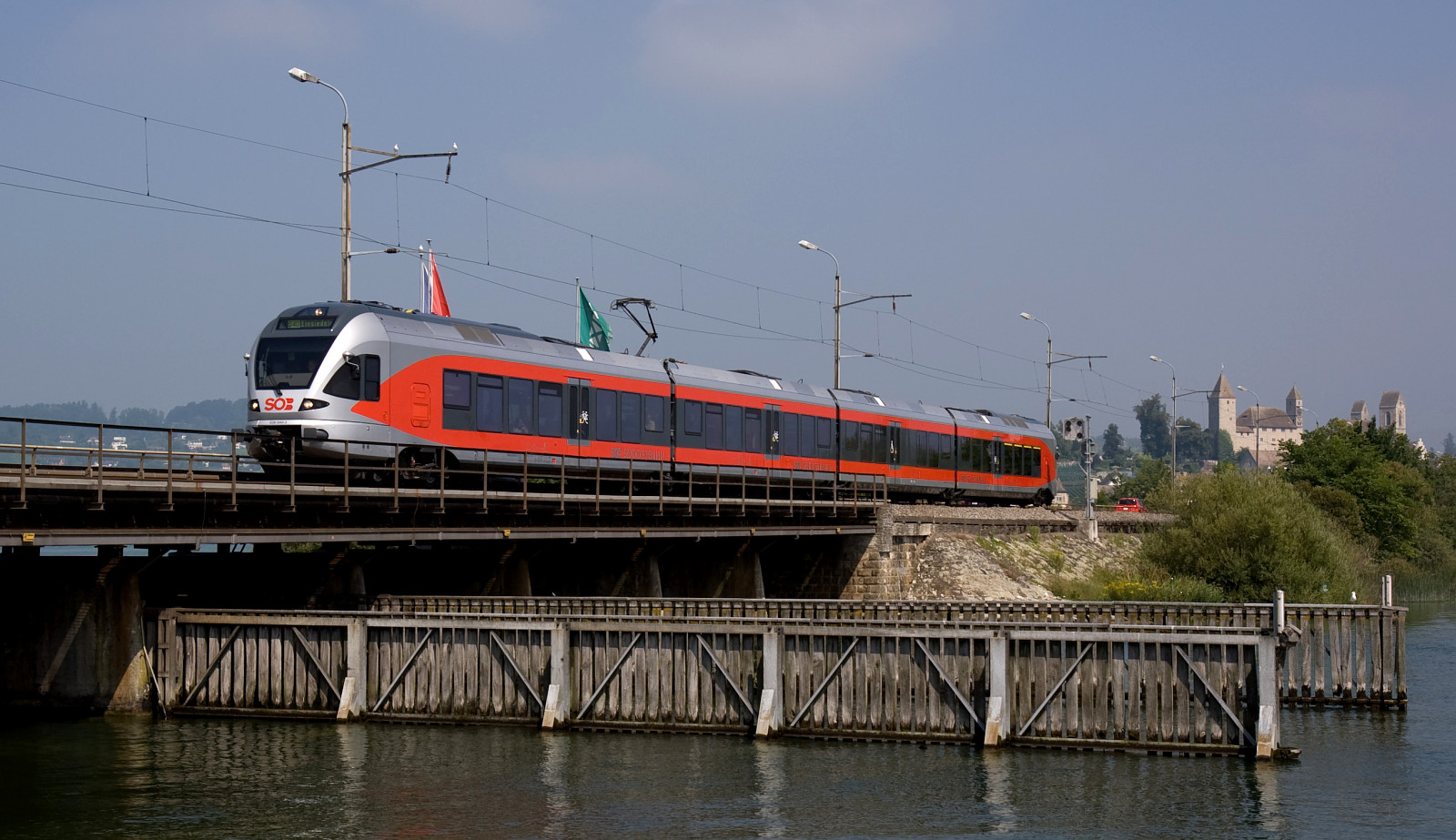
A Südostbahn Stadler FLIRT as S40 on the Seedamm

As of the December 2023 timetable change, Südostbahn (SOB) operates the following S-Bahn services in Central and Eastern Switzerland:

- Lucerne S-Bahn:
  - S31 Arth-Goldau – Steinerberg – Sattel – Biberegg – Rothenthurm – Altmatt – Biberbrugg
- St. Gallen S-Bahn:
  - S4 Rapperswil – Uznach – Kaltbrunn – Wattwil – Lichtensteig – Brunnadern-Neckertal – Mogelsberg – Degersheim – Schachen (Herisau) – Herisau – St. Gallen Haggen – St. Gallen – St. Gallen St. Fiden – Mörschwil – Goldach – Rorschach Stadt – Rorschach – Staad – Rheineck – St. Margrethen – Au SG – Heerbrugg – Rebstein-Marbach – Altstätten SG – Oberriet – Rüthi SG – Salez-Sennwald – Buchs SG – Sevelen – Sargans
  - S6 Rapperswil – Blumenau – Schmerikon – Uznach – Benken – Schänis – Ziegelbrücke – Nieder- und Oberurnen – Näfels-Mollis – Netstal – Glarus – Ennenda – Mitlödi – Schwanden ( – Nidfurn-Haslen – Leuggelbach – Luchsingen-Hätzingen – Diesbach-Betschwanden – Rüti GL – Linthal Braunwaldbahn – Linthal, only during off-peak hours)
  - S17 Sargans – Mels – Flums – Walenstadt – Unterterzen – Murg – Mühlehorn – Ziegelbrücke – Schänis – Benken – Uznach – Schmerikon – Blumenau – Rapperswil
  - S81 St. Gallen – St. Gallen Haggen – Herisau
- Zürich S-Bahn:
  - S13 Einsiedeln – Biberbrugg – Schindellegi-Feusisberg – Samstagern – Grüenfeld – Burghalden – Wädenswil
  - S40 Einsiedeln – Biberbrugg – Schindellegi-Feusisberg – Samstagern – Riedmatt – Wollerau – Wilen bei Wollerau – Freienbach SOB – Pfäffikon SZ – Hurden – Rapperswil
- Not formally part of an S-Bahn network:
  - S27 (March shuttle) Ziegelbrücke – Bilten – Reichenburg – Schübelbach-Buttikon – Siebnen-Wangen (operates only Monday–Friday during peak-hours)

== See also ==
- Rail transport in Switzerland
