= Altmatt railway station =

Railway station in Switzerland

Altmatt
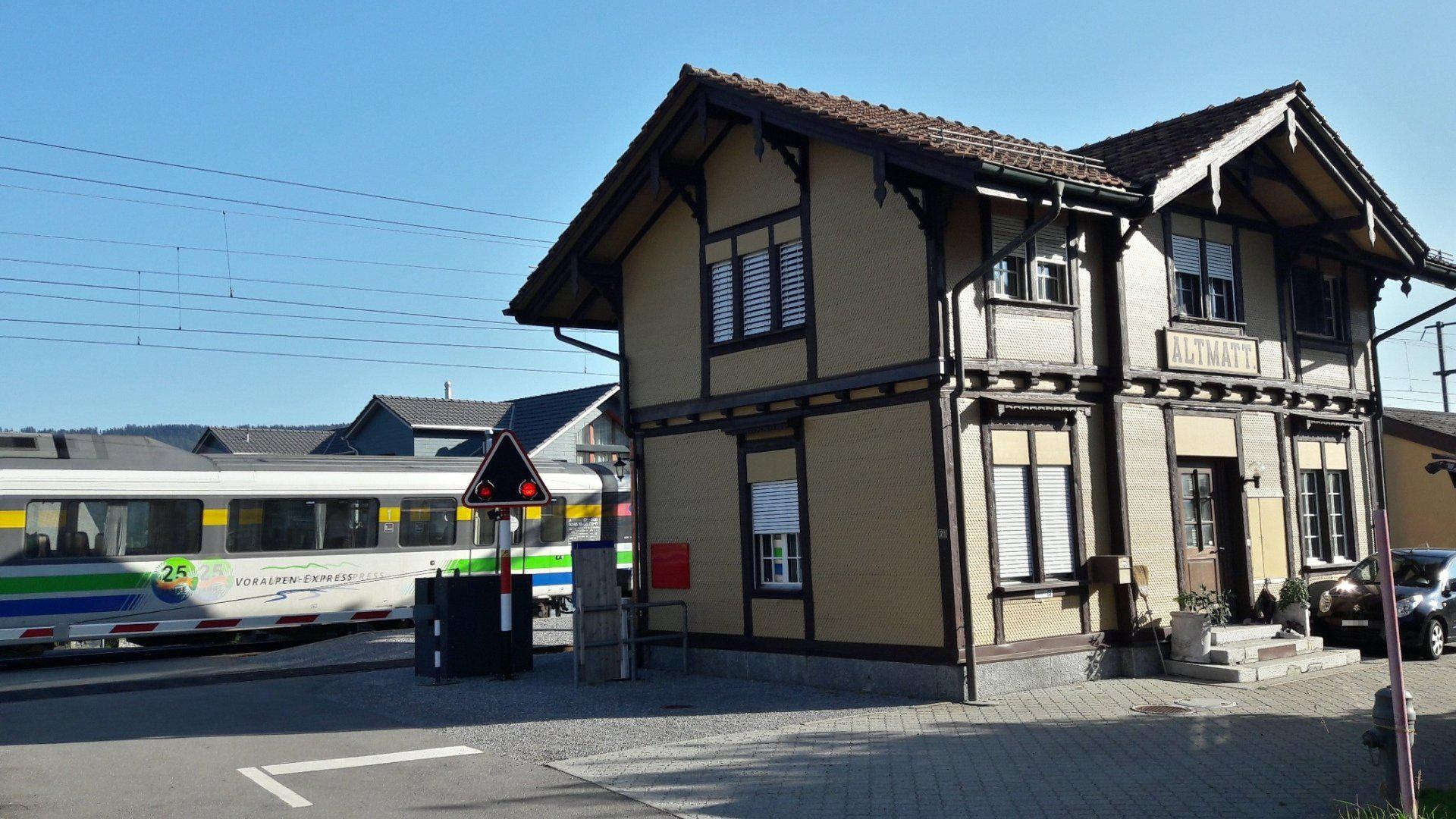
- The station building in 2018

General information
- Location: Rothenthurm; Switzerland
- Coordinates: 47°07′54″N 8°41′46″E
- Elevation: 920 m (3,020 ft)
- Owner: Südostbahn
- Line: Pfäffikon–Arth-Goldau line
- Train operators: Südostbahn

Services
Preceding station	Lucerne S-Bahn	Following station
Rothenthurm towards Arth-Goldau	S31	Biberbrugg Terminus
Location
- Location within Switzerland Location within Canton of Schwyz

Altmatt railway station (German: Bahnhof Altmatt) is a railway station in Rothenthurm, in the Swiss canton of Schwyz. It is an intermediate stop on the standard gauge Pfäffikon–Arth-Goldau line of Südostbahn.

== Services ==
The following services stop at Altmatt:

- Lucerne S-Bahn S31: hourly service between Arth-Goldau and Biberbrugg.
