= Rothenthurm railway station =

Railway station in Switzerland

Rothenthurm
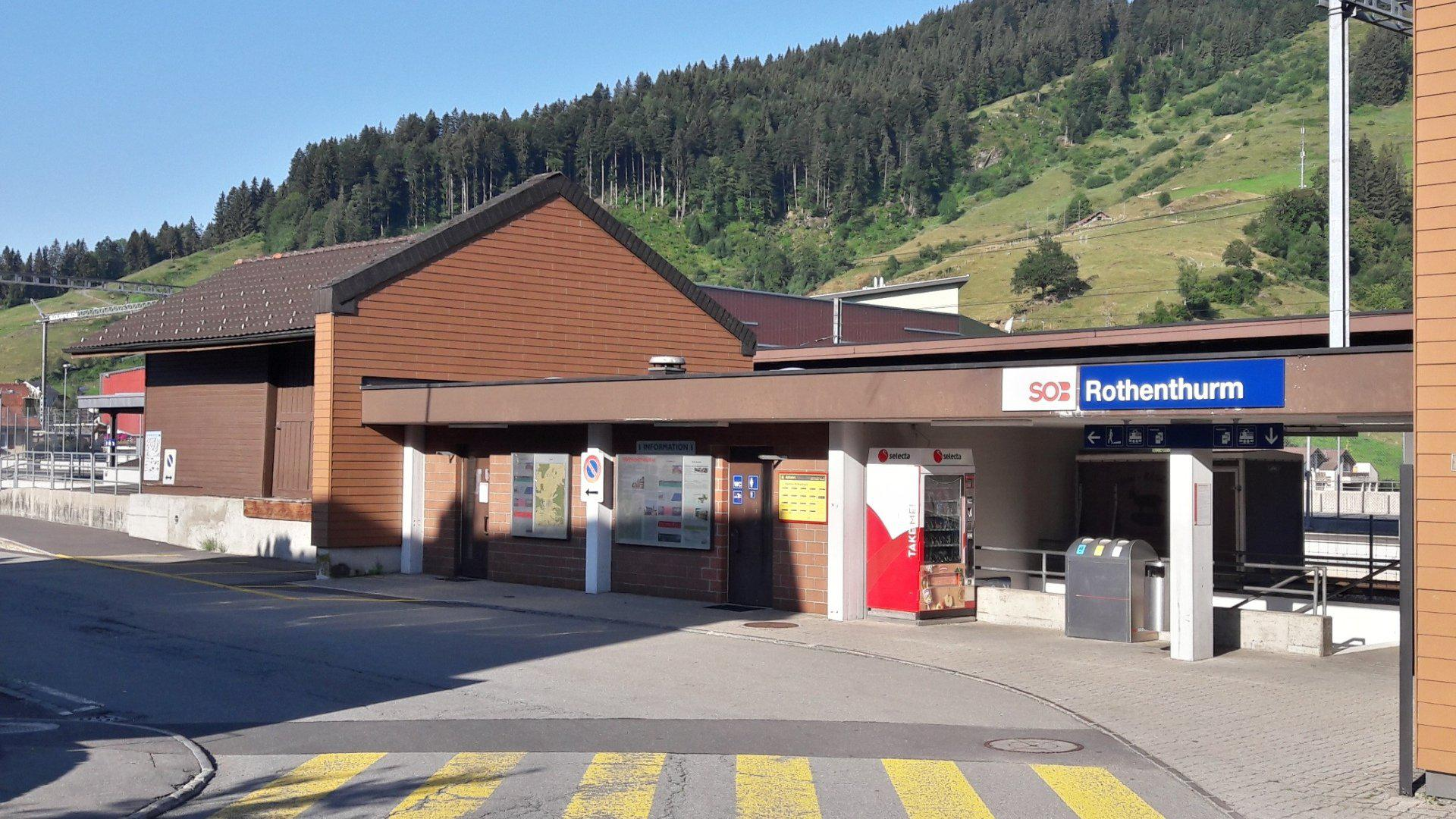
- The station in 2018

General information
- Location: Rothenthurm; Switzerland
- Coordinates: 47°06′21″N 8°40′29″E
- Elevation: 923 m (3,028 ft)
- Owner: Südostbahn
- Line: Pfäffikon–Arth-Goldau line
- Train operators: Südostbahn

Services
Preceding station	Südostbahn	Following station
Arth-Goldau towards Lucerne	Voralpen Express	Biberbrugg towards St. Gallen
Preceding station	Lucerne S-Bahn	Following station
Biberegg towards Arth-Goldau	S31	Altmatt towards Biberbrugg
Location
- Location within Switzerland Location within Canton of Schwyz

Rothenthurm railway station (German: Bahnhof Rothenthurm) is a railway station in Rothenthurm, in the Swiss canton of Schwyz. It is an intermediate stop on the standard gauge Pfäffikon–Arth-Goldau line of Südostbahn.

== Services ==
The following services stop at Rothenthurm:

- IR Voralpen-Express: hourly service between Lucerne and St. Gallen.
- Lucerne S-Bahn S31: hourly service between Arth-Goldau and Biberbrugg.
