= Steinerberg railway station =

Railway station in Switzerland

Steinerberg
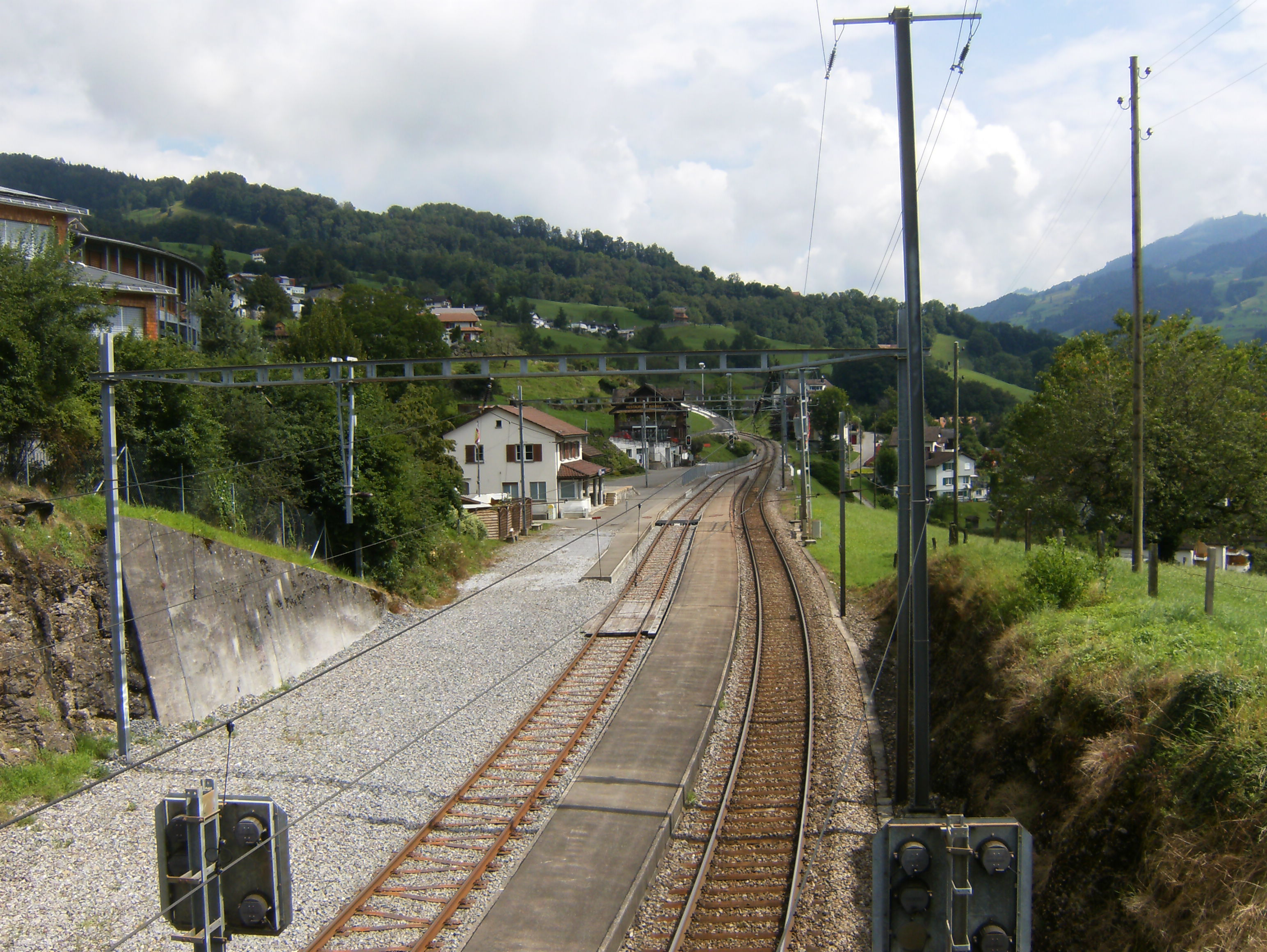
- Steinerberg in 2016

General information
- Location: Steinerberg; Switzerland
- Coordinates: 47°03′08″N 8°35′07″E
- Elevation: 592 m (1,942 ft)
- Owner: Südostbahn
- Line: Pfäffikon–Arth-Goldau line
- Train operators: Südostbahn

Services
Preceding station	Lucerne S-Bahn	Following station
Arth-Goldau Terminus	S31	Sattel towards Biberbrugg
Location
- Location within Switzerland Location within Canton of Schwyz

Steinerberg railway station (German: Bahnhof Steinerberg) is a railway station in Steinerberg, in the Swiss canton of Schwyz. It is an intermediate stop on the standard gauge Pfäffikon–Arth-Goldau line of Südostbahn.

== Services ==
The following services stop at Steinerberg:

- Lucerne S-Bahn S31: hourly service between Arth-Goldau and Biberbrugg.
