= Sattel-Aegeri railway station =

Disused railway station in Switzerland

Sattel-Aegeri
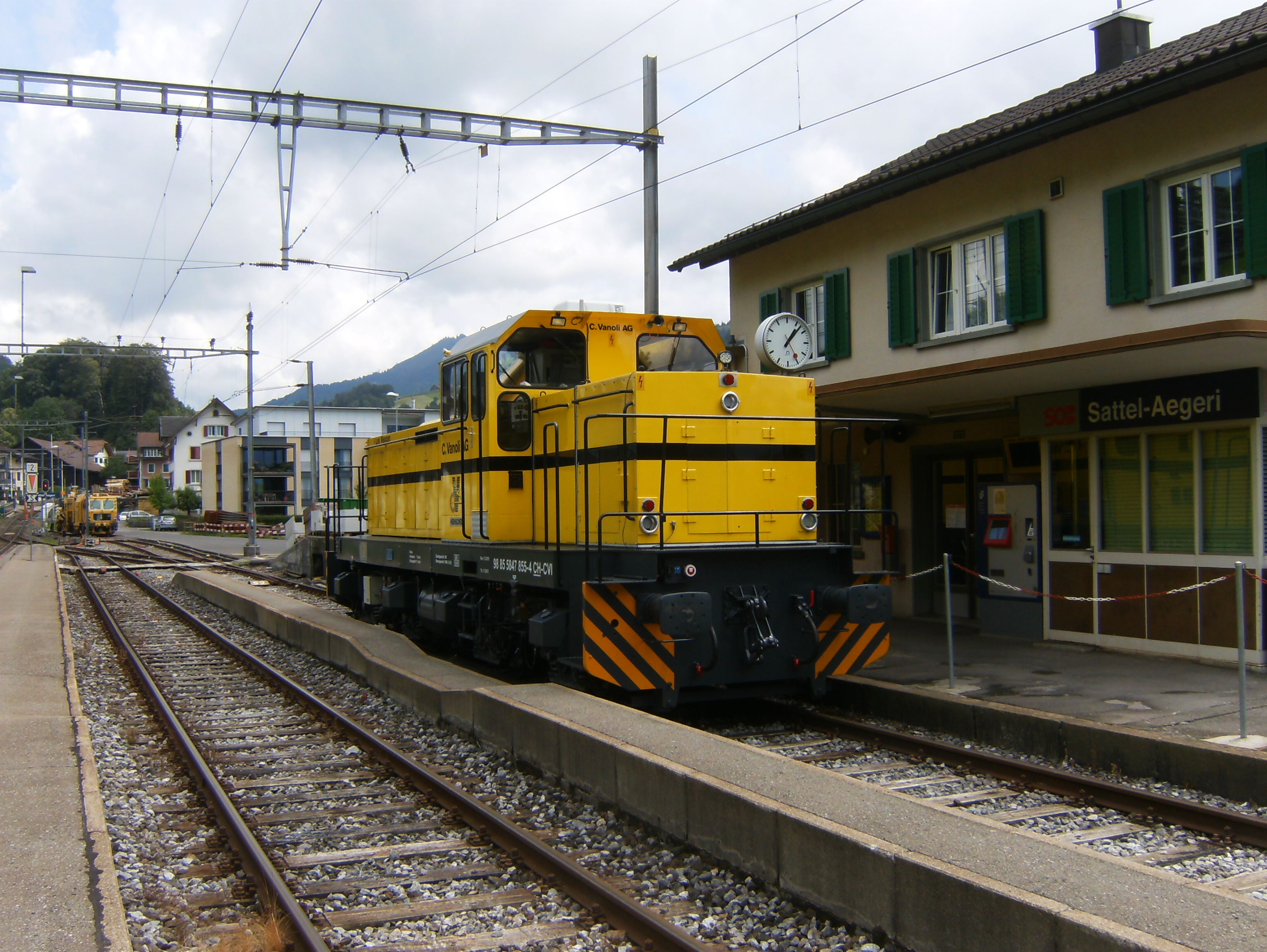
- A work train at Sattel-Aegeri in 2016

General information
- Location: Sattel; Switzerland
- Coordinates: 47°05′N 8°38′E
- Owner: Südostbahn
- Line: Pfäffikon–Arth-Goldau line
- Train operators: Südostbahn

History
- Opened: 31 July 1891
- Closed: 10 December 2023
Location
- Location within Switzerland Location within Canton of Schwyz

Sattel-Aegeri railway station (German: Bahnhof Sattel-Aegeri) was a railway station in Sattel, in the Swiss canton of Schwyz. It was an intermediate stop on the standard gauge Pfäffikon–Arth-Goldau line of Südostbahn. The station closed with the timetable change on 10 December 2023 in favor of a new station, Sattel, located near the town center.
