= St. Gallen Haggen railway station =

Railway station in Switzerland

St. Gallen Haggen
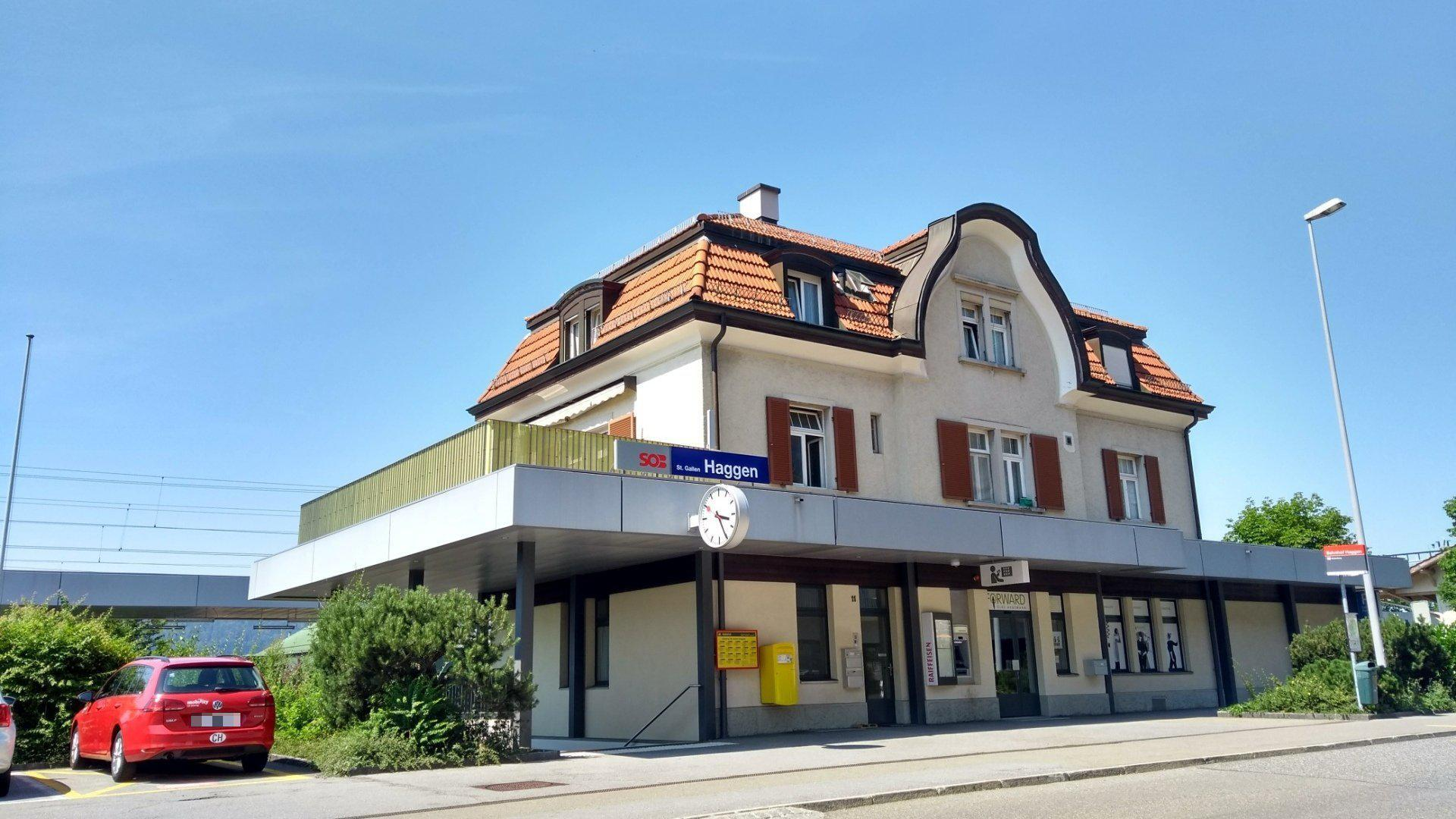
- The station building in 2018

General information
- Location: St. Gallen; Switzerland
- Coordinates: 47°25′N 9°20′E
- Elevation: 677 m (2,221 ft)
- Owner: Südostbahn
- Line: Bodensee–Toggenburg
- Train operators: Südostbahn; Thurbo
- Connections: Ostwind tariff network
- Bus: VBSG bus line 7

Other information
- Fare zone: 210 (Tarifverbund Ostwind)

Services
Preceding station	St. Gallen S-Bahn	Following station
Herisau towards Nesslau-Neu St. Johann	S2	St. Gallen towards Altstätten SG
Herisau towards Rapperswil	S4	St. Gallen towards Sargans
Herisau Terminus	S81	St. Gallen Terminus
Location
- Location within Switzerland Location within Canton of St. Gallen

St. Gallen Haggen railway station (German: Bahnhof St. Gallen Haggen) is a railway station in the Bruggen neighborhood of the city of St. Gallen, in the Swiss canton of St. Gallen. It is an intermediate station on the Bodensee–Toggenburg railway of Südostbahn (SOB) and located within fare zone 210 of the Ostwind tariff network.

== Services ==
St. Gallen Haggen is served by S-Bahn trains only. As of the December 2023 timetable change, the following services stop at St. Gallen Haggen:

- St. Gallen S-Bahn
  - S2 / S4: half-hourly service between Wattwil and Altstätten SG via St. Gallen and hourly service to Rapperswil, Sargans, and Nesslau-Neu St. Johann.
  - S81: hourly service between Herisau and St. Gallen.

The railway station is also served by a bus route of Verkehrsbetriebe St. Gallen (VBSG).

== See also ==
- Bodensee S-Bahn
- Rail transport in Switzerland
