= SOB Traverso =

Swiss passenger trainset

Traverso
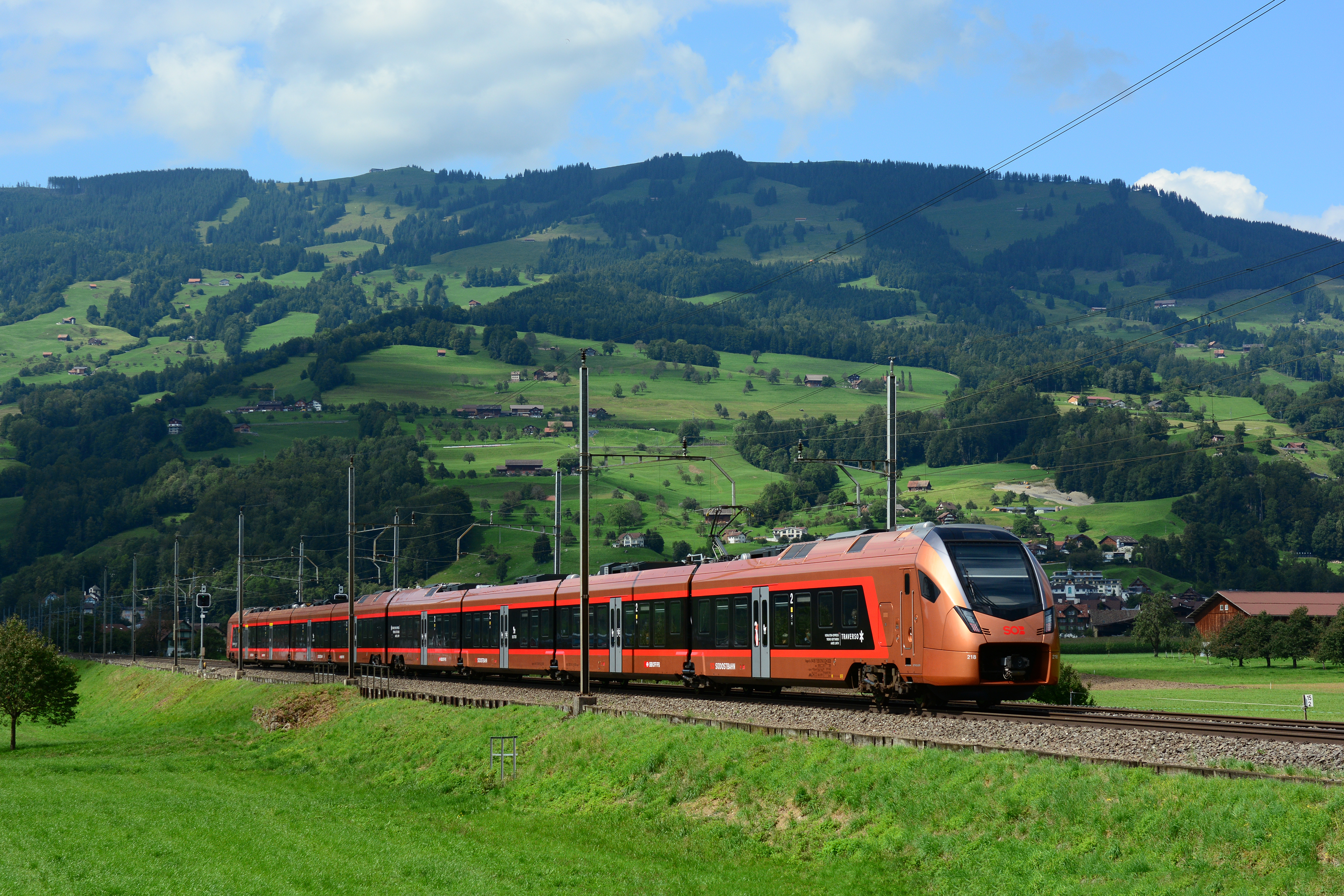
- SOB No. 218 near Steinen with a Treno Gottardo service in 2021

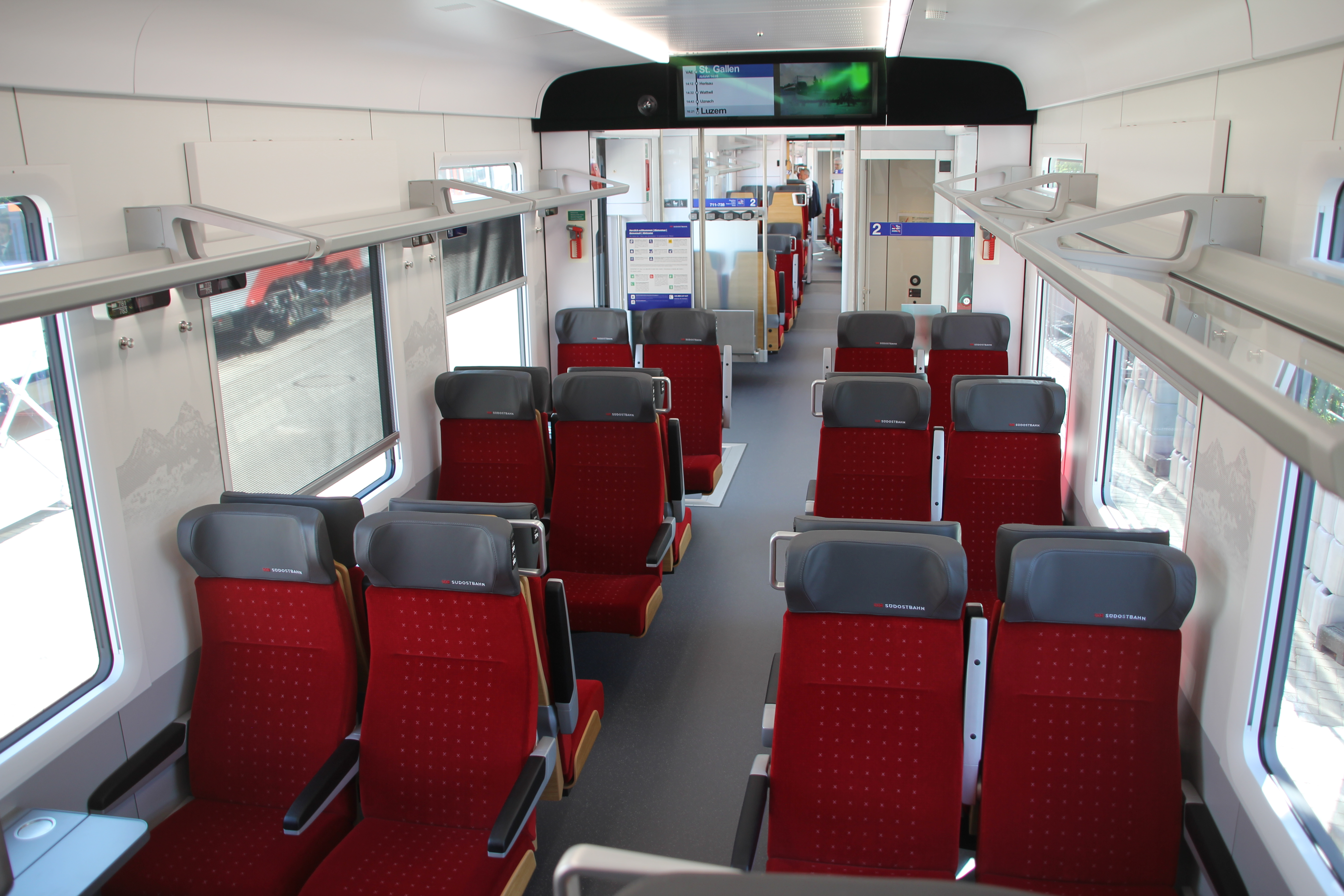
- Second class interior
- In service: 2019–present
- Manufacturer: Stadler Rail
- Number built: 30
- Fleet numbers: 101/201–106/206; 107/207–117/217; 118/218–124/224; 125/225–130/230
- Capacity: 359
- Owner: Südostbahn

Specifications
- Train length: 150,200 mm (492 ft 9 in)
- Width: 2,820 mm (9 ft 3 in)
- Height: 4,120 mm (13 ft 6 in)
- Floor height: 1,145 mm (3 ft 9.1 in)
- Low-floor: 600 mm (2 ft 0 in)
- Articulated sections: 8
- Maximum speed: 160 km/h (99 mph)
- Electric system: 15 kV 16.7 Hz AC
- UIC classification: Bo'2'2'2Bo' + Bo'2'2'2 Bo'

The SOB Traverso, designated RABe 526, is a passenger articulated trainset manufactured by Stadler Rail for Südostbahn, a railway company in Switzerland. It is a derivative of the Stadler FLIRT and began entering service in 2019. Südostbahn employs the Traversos on long-distance routes such as the Voralpen-Express and the Treno Gottardo services over the traditional Gotthard railway.

== History ==
Südostbahn (SOB) ordered six eight-car trainsets from Stadler Rail in June 2016, as part of an CHF 170 million order that also included five four-car trainsets for use on local services. Südostbahn ordered eleven more eight-car trainsets in December 2017 to operate two InterRegio routes, dubbed Treno Gottardo, that would use the traditional route over the Gotthard railway. Under an agreement with Swiss Federal Railways, SOB would assume the operation of these services with the December 2020 timetable change. With SOB and SBB having made a further agreement for the joint operation of the Aare Linth between Bern and Chur, SOB ordered seven more trainsets in December 2018. Altogether the three orders cost CHF 480 million.

As planned, the first Traversos began operation in December 2019 on the Voralpen-Express. The trains were painted in a copper livery that according to SOB symbolized "the historical development of human society." The Treno Gottardo trains, operating from Basel SBB and Zürich HB to Locarno, commenced in December 2020. SOB began running Traversos on the Aare Linth in December 2021.

== Design ==
Each formation is composed of eight cars, with a normal seating capacity of 359. Altogether the formation is 150,200 millimetres (492 ft 9 in) long. Cars are 2,820 millimetres (9 ft 3 in) wide and stand 4,120 millimetres (13 ft 6 in) tall. The cars are designed for low floor boarding; doors are 600 millimetres (2 ft 0 in) from the ground.

Traversos have both first- and second-class seating, 68 of the former and 291 of the latter. There are also 21 seats that can fold out for additional capacity. Vending machines provide on-board catering.

== Rolling stock ==
The Traverso fleet was delivered in four series:

- Series 1 (RABe 526 201–206) was delivered in 2019
- Series 2 (RABe 526 207–217) was delivered in 2020
- Series 3 (RABe 526 218–224) was delivered in 2021
- Series 4 (RABe 526 225–230) was delivered in 2024

== See also ==
- BLS RABe 528 – Swiss passenger trainset
- Swiss locomotive and railcar classification
