= Hochstuckli =

Mountain in Switzerland

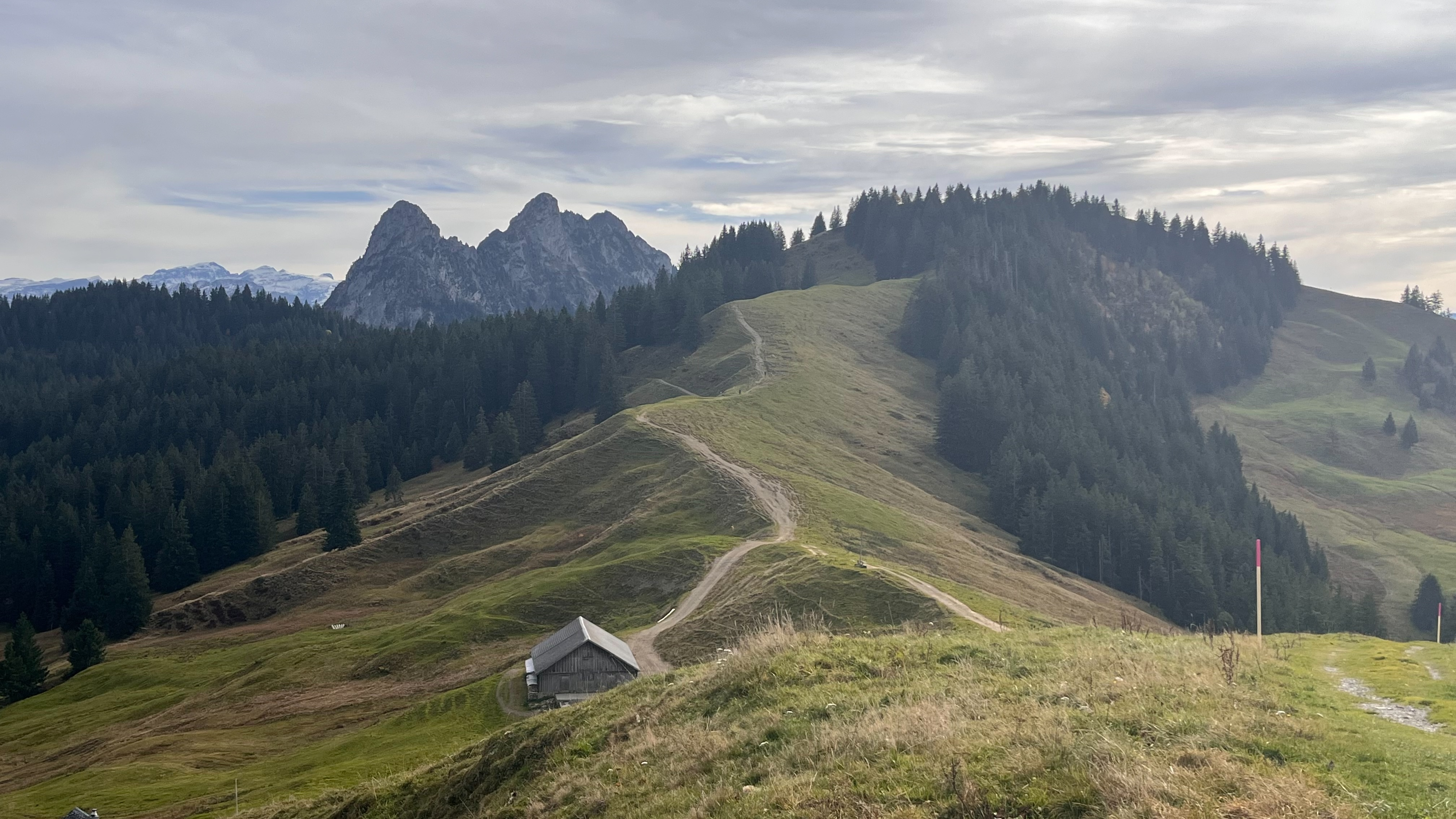
- Hochstuckli (Grosser Mythen in the background)

Highest point
- Elevation: 1,566 m (5,138 ft)
- Prominence: 156 m (512 ft)
- Parent peak: Gross Mythen
- Coordinates: 47°03′28″N 8°40′11″E

Geography
- Location within Switzerland Location within Canton of Schwyz
- Country: Switzerland
- Canton: Schwyz
- Parent range: Schwyzer Alps

The Hochstuckli is a 1,566 m (5,138 ft) high mountain of the Schwyzer Alps, overlooking Mostelberg in the canton of Schwyz, Switzerland.

== Transport ==
Mostelberg can be reached via a gondola lift, whose valley station is located near Sattel railway station. During winter, the mountain is part of a ski resort area. A ski-lift climbs to an elevation of 1,486 m (4,875 ft).

== See also ==
- List of mountains of the canton of Schwyz
