= Mostelberg =

Coordinates: 47°04′00″N 8°38′58″E

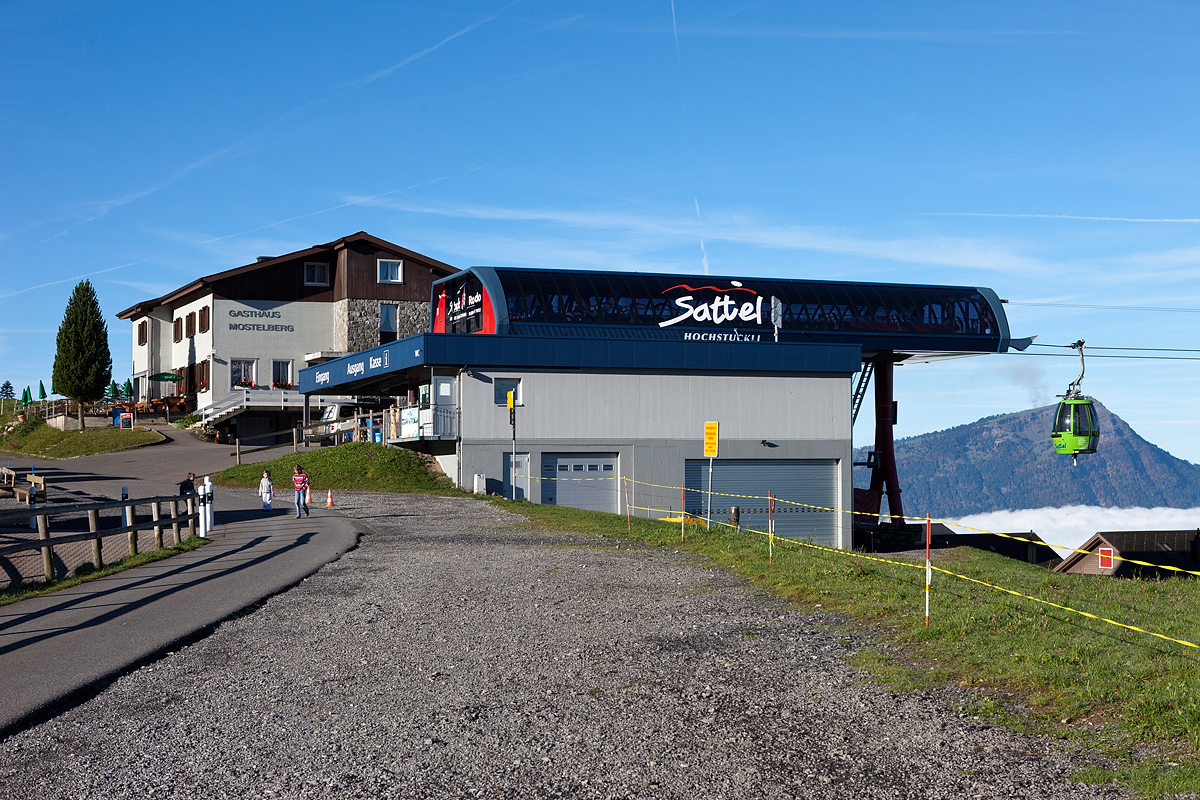
Gondola station

Mostelberg (also known simply as Mostel) is a resort in the Swiss Alps, located in the canton of Schwyz. The village is situated in the region between Lake Ägeri and Lake Lauerz, above Sattel, at a height of 1,191 metres above sea level. It belongs to the municipality of Sattel.

Mostelberg can be reached via a gondola lift from Sattel. In winter the resort includes a ski area culminating near the Hochstuckli.

Near the gondola station is located a 374-metre-long foot suspension bridge. The bridge crosses the Lauitobel valley.
