= Rothenthurm =

- Municipality
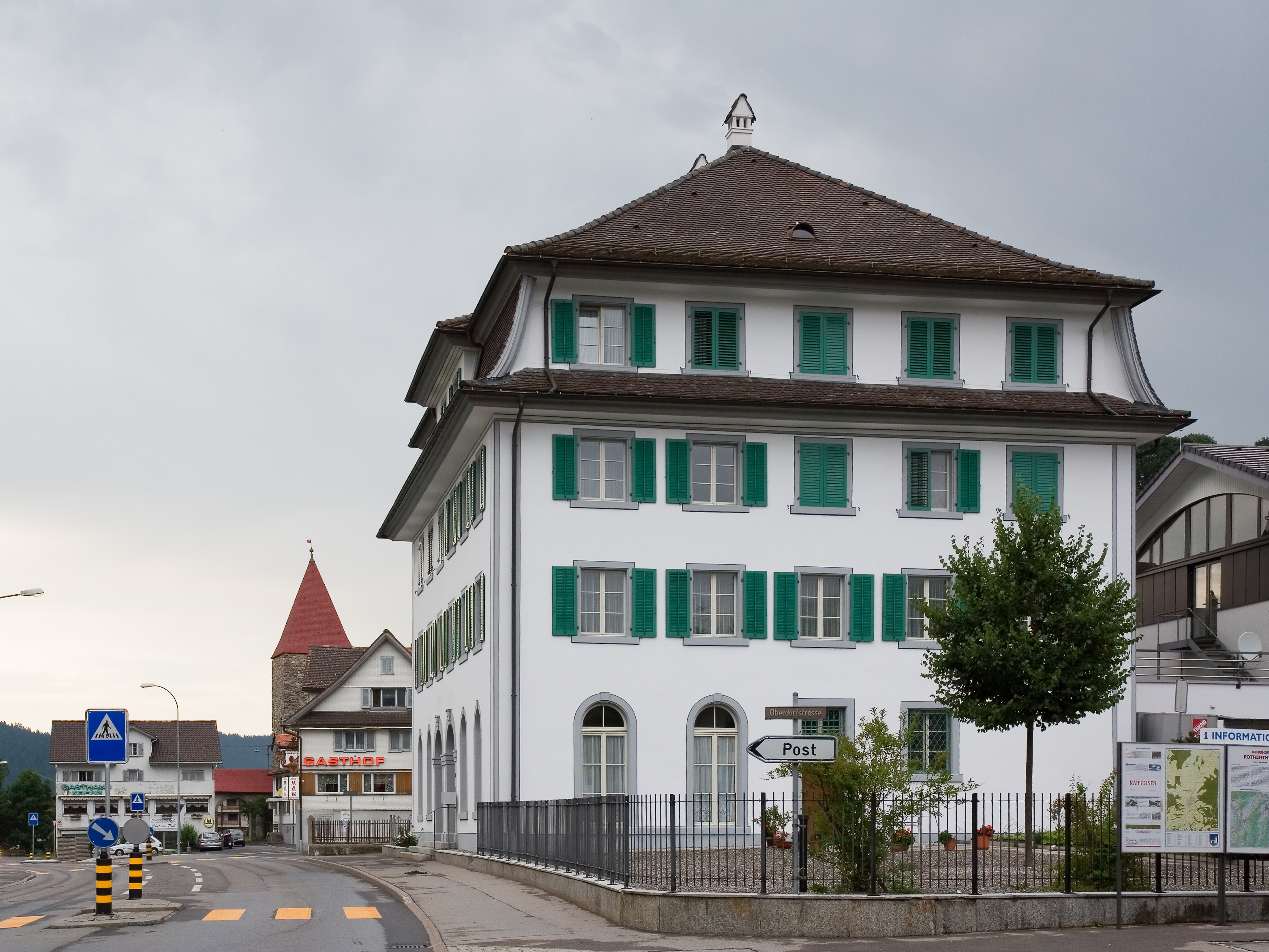

- Coat of arms
- Location of Rothenthurm
- Location within Switzerland Location within Canton of Schwyz
- Coordinates: 47°6′N 8°40′E
- Country: Switzerland
- Canton: Schwyz
- District: Schwyz

Area
  - Total: 22.80 km^{2} (8.80 sq mi)
- Elevation: 923 m (3,028 ft)

Population (December 2020)
  - Total: 2,484
  - Density: 108.9/km^{2} (282.2/sq mi)
- Time zone: UTC+01:00 (CET)
  - Summer (DST): UTC+02:00 (CEST)
- Postal code: 6418
- SFOS number: 1370
- ISO 3166 code: CH-SZ
- Surrounded by: Alpthal, Einsiedeln, Oberägeri (ZG), Sattel, Schwyz
- Website: www.rothenthurm.ch

Rothenthurm is a municipality in Schwyz District in the canton of Schwyz in Switzerland.

== History ==
Aerial view from 1000 m by Walter Mittelholzer (1923)

The French invasion of Switzerland in 1798 brought about a swift end of the Ancien Régime. The French victories against the larger cities of the Swiss Plateau led to the creation of the French supported Helvetic Republic on 12 April 1798. Following the declaration of the Republic, the Cantons of Uri, Schwyz and Nidwalden rejected it and raised an army to fight the French. Under Alois von Reding they were able to raise about 10,000 men. This army was deployed along the defensive line from Napf to Rapperswil. General Reding besieged French controlled Lucerne and marched across the Brünig pass into the Berner Oberland to support the armies of Berne. At the same time, the French General Balthazar Alexis Henri Schauenburg marched out of occupied Zürich to attack Zug, Lucerne and the Sattel Pass. Even though the Reding's army won victories at Rothenthurm and Morgarten, Schauenburg's victory near Sattel allowed him to threaten the town of Schwyz. On 4 May 1798, the town council of Schwyz surrendered.

== Geography ==
Rothenthurm has an area, as of 2006, of 22.8 km^{2} (8.8 sq mi). Of this area, 44.1% is used for agricultural purposes, while 48.6% is forested. Of the rest of the land, 4.2% is settled (buildings or roads) and the remainder (3.1%) is non-productive (rivers, glaciers or mountains).

== Demographics ==
Rothenthurm has a population (as of 31 December 2020) of 2,484. As of 2007, 13.4% of the population was made up of foreign nationals. Over the last 10 years the population has grown at a rate of 2.7%. Most of the population (as of 2000) speaks German (89.8%), with Serbo-Croatian being second most common ( 2.6%) and Albanian being third ( 2.5%).

As of 2000 the gender distribution of the population was 51.2% male and 48.8% female. The age distribution, as of 2008, in Rothenthurm is; 650 people or 31.1% of the population is between 0 and 19. 698 people or 33.4% are 20 to 39, and 544 people or 26.0% are 40 to 64. The senior population distribution is 116 people or 5.6% are 65 to 74. There are 64 people or 3.1% who are 70 to 79 and 17 people or 0.81% of the population who are over 80.

As of 2000 there are 723 households, of which 176 households (or about 24.3%) contain only a single individual. 77 or about 10.7% are large households, with at least five members.

In the 2007 election the most popular party was the SVP which received 61.4% of the vote. The next three most popular parties were the CVP (20.3%), the FDP (8.8%) and the SPS (8%).

In Rothenthurm about 57.2% of the population (between age 25–64) have completed either non-mandatory upper secondary education or additional higher education (either university or a Fachhochschule).

Rothenthurm has an unemployment rate of 1.15%. As of 2005, there were 121 people employed in the primary economic sector and about 42 businesses involved in this sector. 409 people are employed in the secondary sector and there are 43 businesses in this sector. 212 people are employed in the tertiary sector, with 55 businesses in this sector.

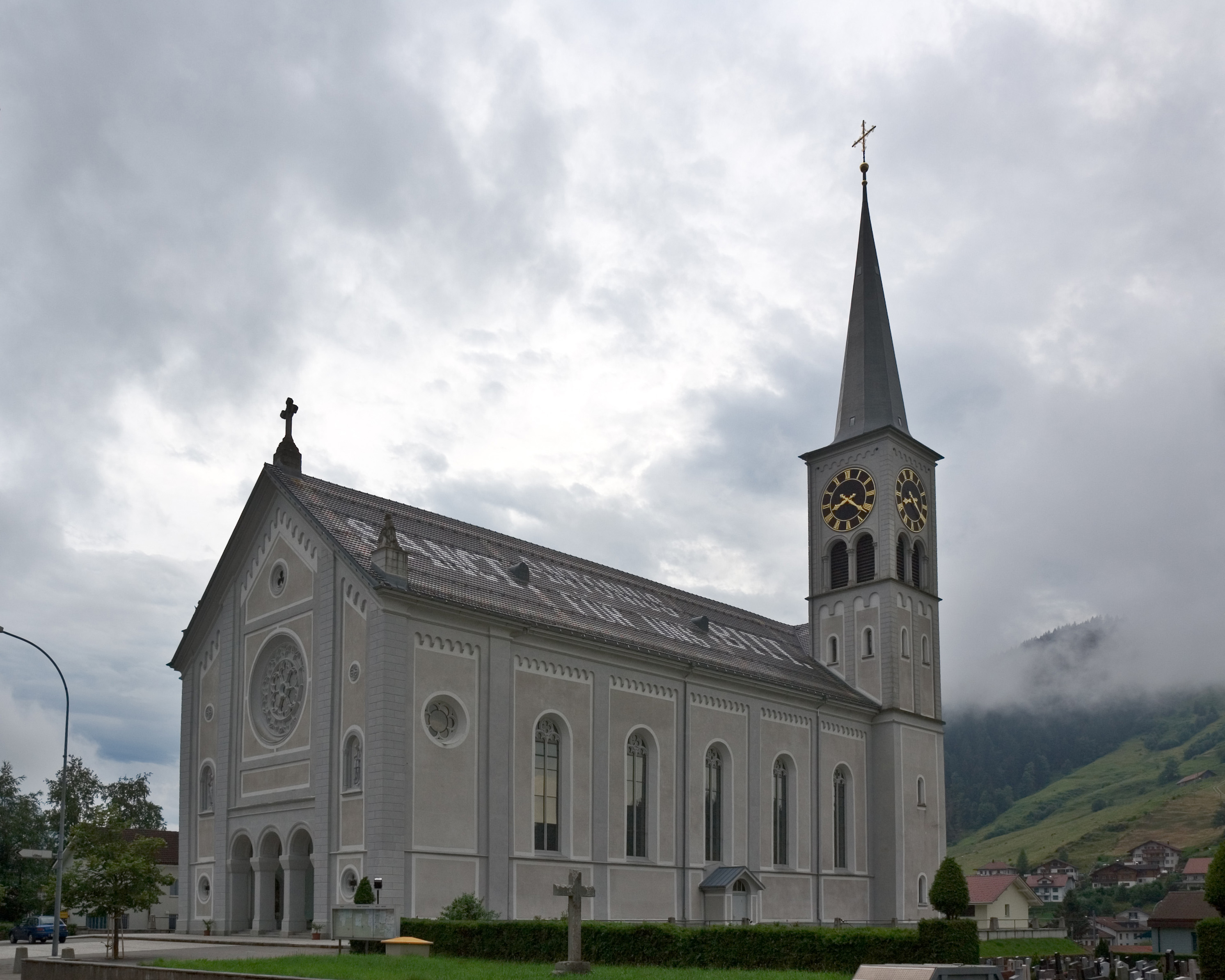
Rothenthurm parish church

From the 2000 census, 1,664 or 79.7% are Roman Catholic, while 140 or 6.7% belonged to the Swiss Reformed Church. Of the rest of the population, there are 75 individuals (or about 3.59% of the population) who belong to the Orthodox Church, and there are less than 5 individuals who belong to another Christian church. There are 100 (or about 4.79% of the population) who are Islamic. There are less than 5 individuals who belong to another church (not listed on the census), 39 (or about 1.87% of the population) belong to no church, are agnostic or atheist, and 66 individuals (or about 3.16% of the population) did not answer the question.

The historical population is given in the following table:

| year | population |
|---|---|
| 1950 | 970 |
| 1960 | 1,159 |
| 1970 | 1,282 |
| 1980 | 1,345 |
| 1985 | 1,436 |
| 1990 | 1,664 |
| 2000 | 2,063 |
| 2005 | 2,017 |
| 2007 | 2,081 |

== Tourism ==
In winter, the 20 km long cross-country skiing trail Finnenloipe Rothenthurm leads through the high moor of Rothenthurm.

== See also ==
- Rothenthurm Initiative
- Rothenthurm railway station
