= Pfäffikon–Arth-Goldau railway =

Railway line in Switzerland

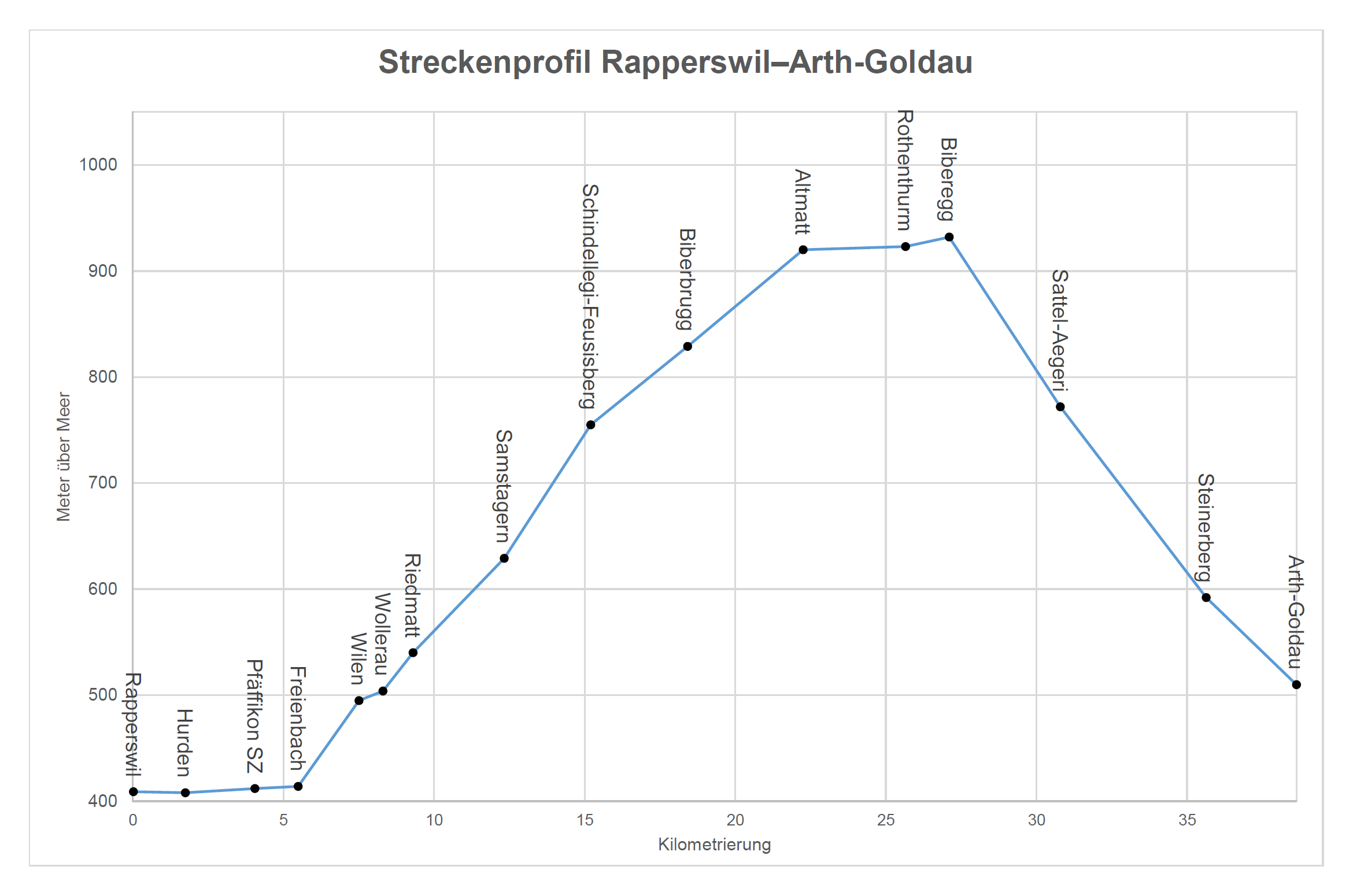

Overview
- Owner: Südostbahn
- Line number: 670
- Termini: Pfäffikon SZ; Arth-Goldau

Technical
- Line length: 34.58 km (21.49 mi)
- Number of tracks: mostly 1
- Track gauge: 1,435 mm (4 ft 8 1/2 in) standard gauge
- Electrification: 15 kV/16.7 Hz AC overhead catenary
- Maximum incline: 5.0%

The Pfäffikon–Arth-Goldau railway is a largely single-track standard-gauge line in Switzerland. It was the only line built by the original Schweizerischen Südostbahn (Swiss Southeastern Railway). Two connecting lines, the Rapperswil–Pfäffikon railway over the Seedamm (causeway) and the Wädenswil–Einsiedeln railway, were built by two predecessor companies, the Wädenswil-Einsiedeln-Bahn and the Zürichsee–Gotthardbahn (Lake Zürich-Gotthard Railway). The Pfäffikon–Arth-Goldau railway used the line between Samstagern and Biberbrugg that had been built as part of the Wädenswil–Einsiedeln railway. The line, including a 34.58 kilometre-long section of the Bodensee–Toggenburg railway (Bodensee-Toggenburg-Bahn) that became part of the new Südostbahn as the result of a merger in 2001, has been electrified since 15 May 1939 at 15 kV AC 16^{2}/_{3} Hz.

== History ==
The line was built to give access to the Gotthard Railway. Due to the local conditions, the Wädenswil–Einsiedeln section was built with a grade of up to 5.0%. The line was taken into operations on 29 July 1891 and officially opened on 31 July. However, official approval for regular operations did not arrive until 4 August. This discrepancy can be explained by the fact that between 31 July and 3 August 1891 Schwyz was celebrating the 600 anniversary of the foundation of the Swiss Confederation and therefore already had special trains for this celebration. The first scheduled train ran on 8 August 1891. The first authorisation was still subject to conditions and operations were therefore limited. The final approval was only granted after the official bridge tests in 1892 as further work had to be carried out on some bridges.

Finance for electrification was not secured for a long time, but it was eventually approved at the General Meeting on 6 July 1938. Work began immediately on building the overhead line and the transmission lines. It was scheduled to be completed before the Swiss National Exhibition of 1939 in Zürich (Landi 39). The electricity would be supplied at cost price from the Etzel works of the SBB. The electrification succeeded and the lines were electrified within 10 months. A small celebration took place on 13 May. Electrical operations should have been started on the entire network of the Südostbahn at the timetable change on 15 May 1939. However, the railway did not have its own electric rolling stock at this time. The eight railcars (CFZe 4/4 and BCFZe 4/4) ordered in 1938 had not yet been delivered.

Biberegg station was opened as a halt for winter sports in 1935 and it was converted into a normal halt in 1979. Riedmatt station was opened in 1974. Freienbach station was upgraded to a crossing station in 1988. Due to the increase in traffic, the line between Samstagern and Schindellegi-Feusisberg was duplicated in 1992.

Deformations developed in the lower part of Lustenau tunnel (or Tunnel No. 2). These were caused by the slope pressures and the cutting of the valley side as a result of the relocation of a cantonal road on the ridge pierced by the tunnel. The deformations became so strong at the beginning of 1975 that intervention work became inevitable. The tunnel was converted into a cutting with a retaining wall in May 1975. Replacement bus services lasted 12 days.

Since 15 October 1977, the Pfäffikon–Arth-Goldau line has been equipped at least to the former SBB profile I, that is a rail weight of 46 kg/m (92.7 lb/yd). The restrictions on axle load and linear load on bridges could then be lifted. Since 2018, all rolling stock up to and including class D4 (22.5 t or 22.1 long tons or 24.8 short tons axle load, 8 t/m (7.2 long ton/yd; 8.1 short ton/yd) linear load) have been allowed on the line.

== Gallery ==
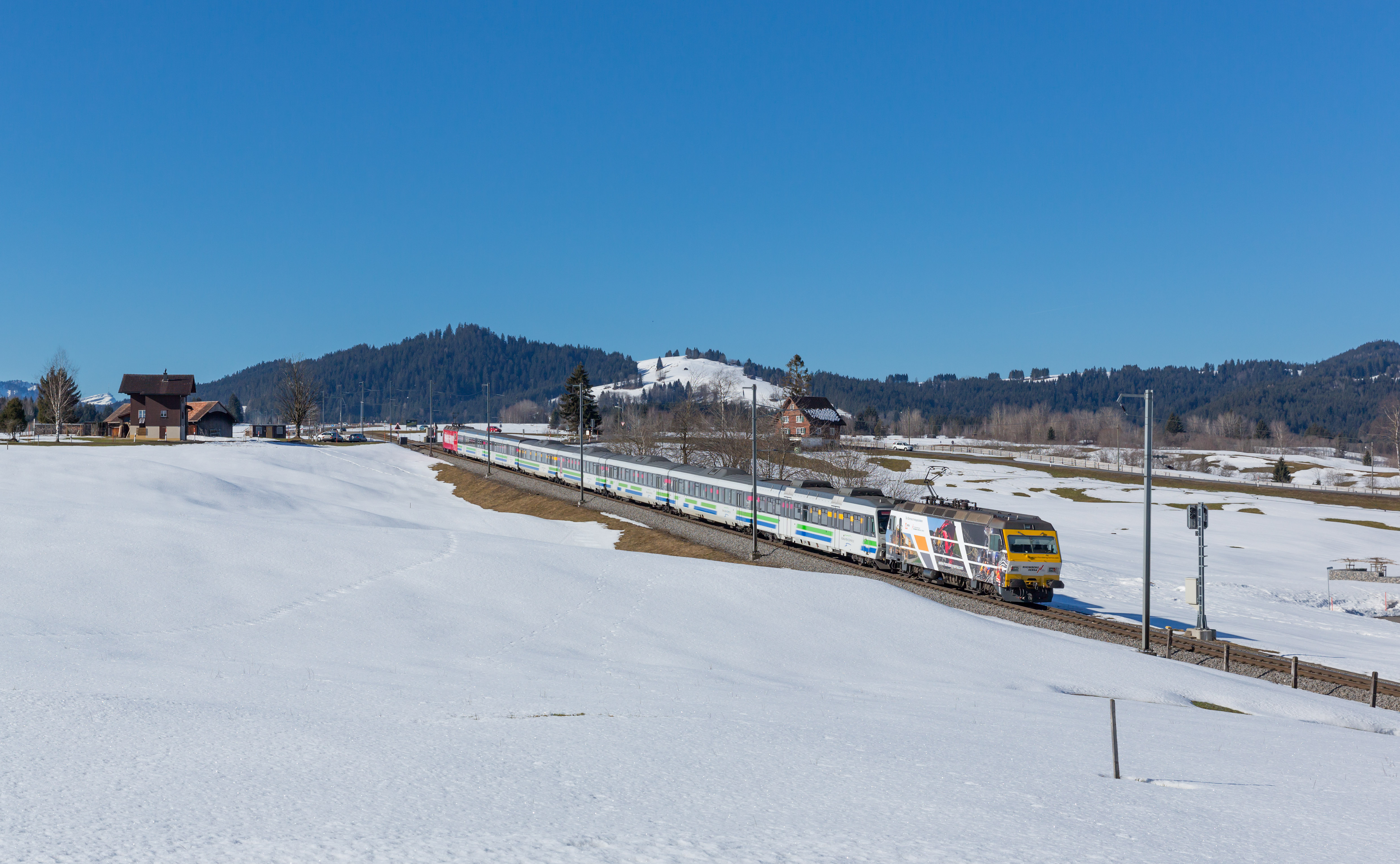
Former Voralpen Express trainset near Altmatt

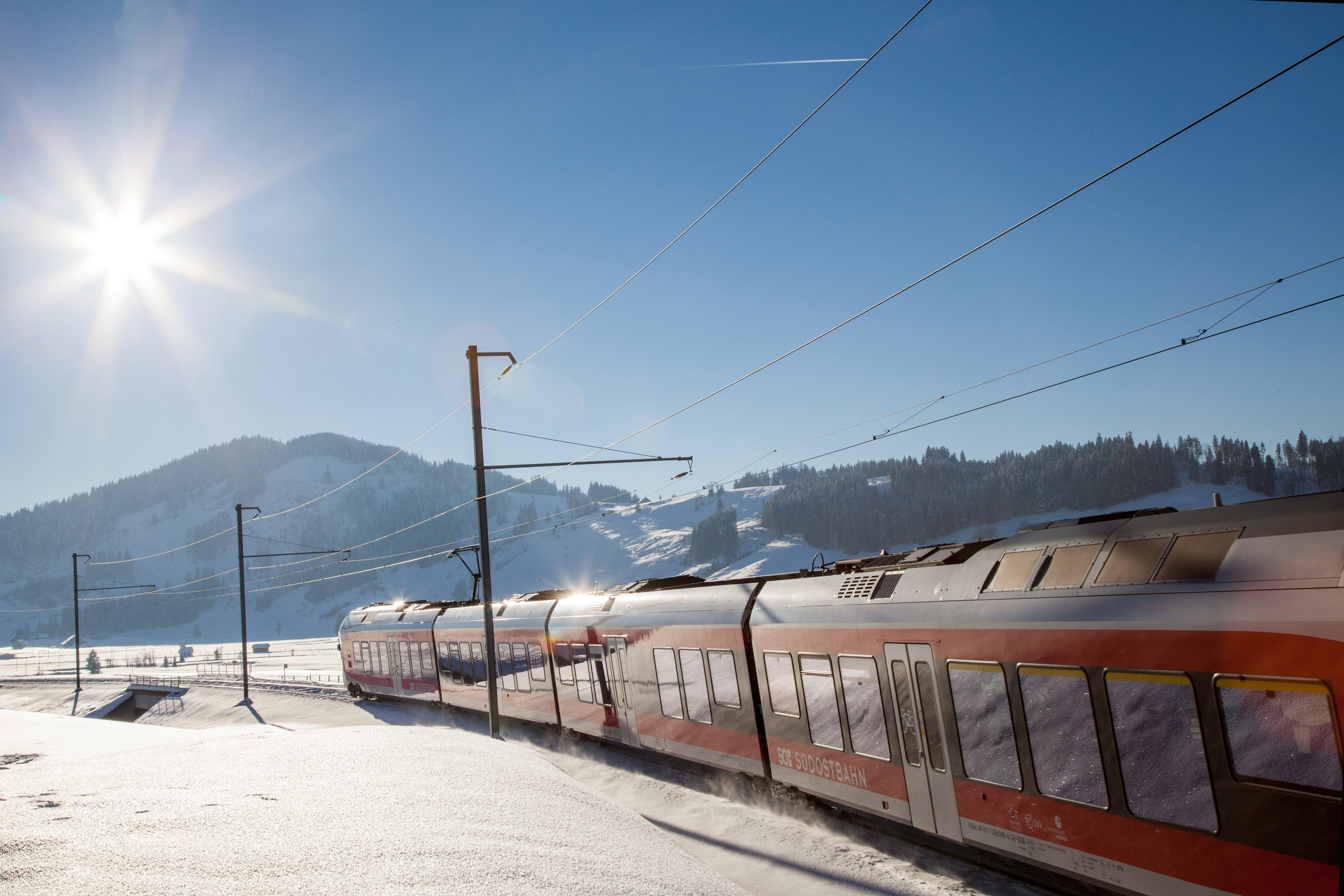
Südostbahn Stadler FLIRT near Altmatt

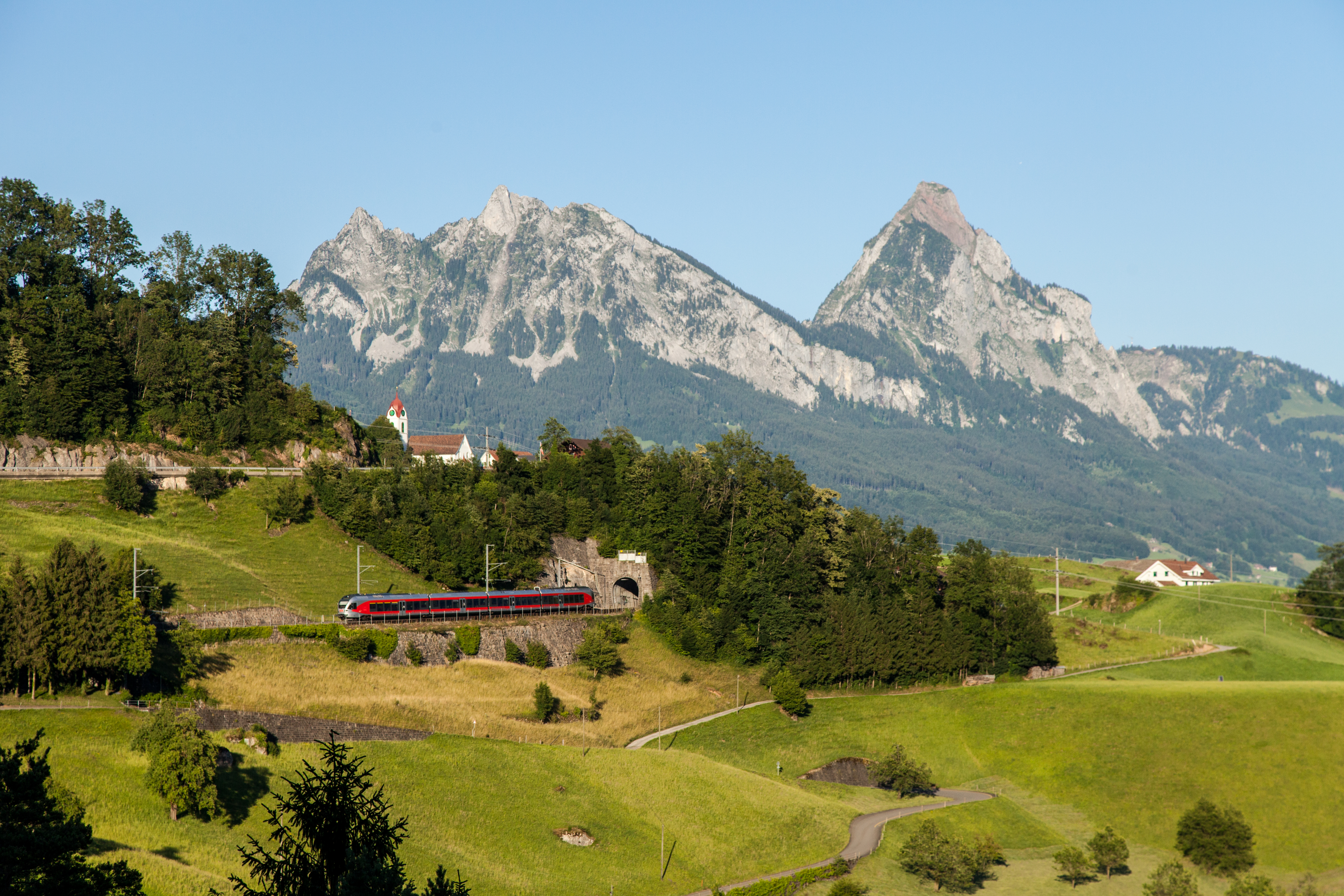
Südostbahn Stadler Flirt near Steinerberg (Mythen in the background)
