= Schweizerische Südostbahn (1890) =

Swiss Southeast Railway (original)
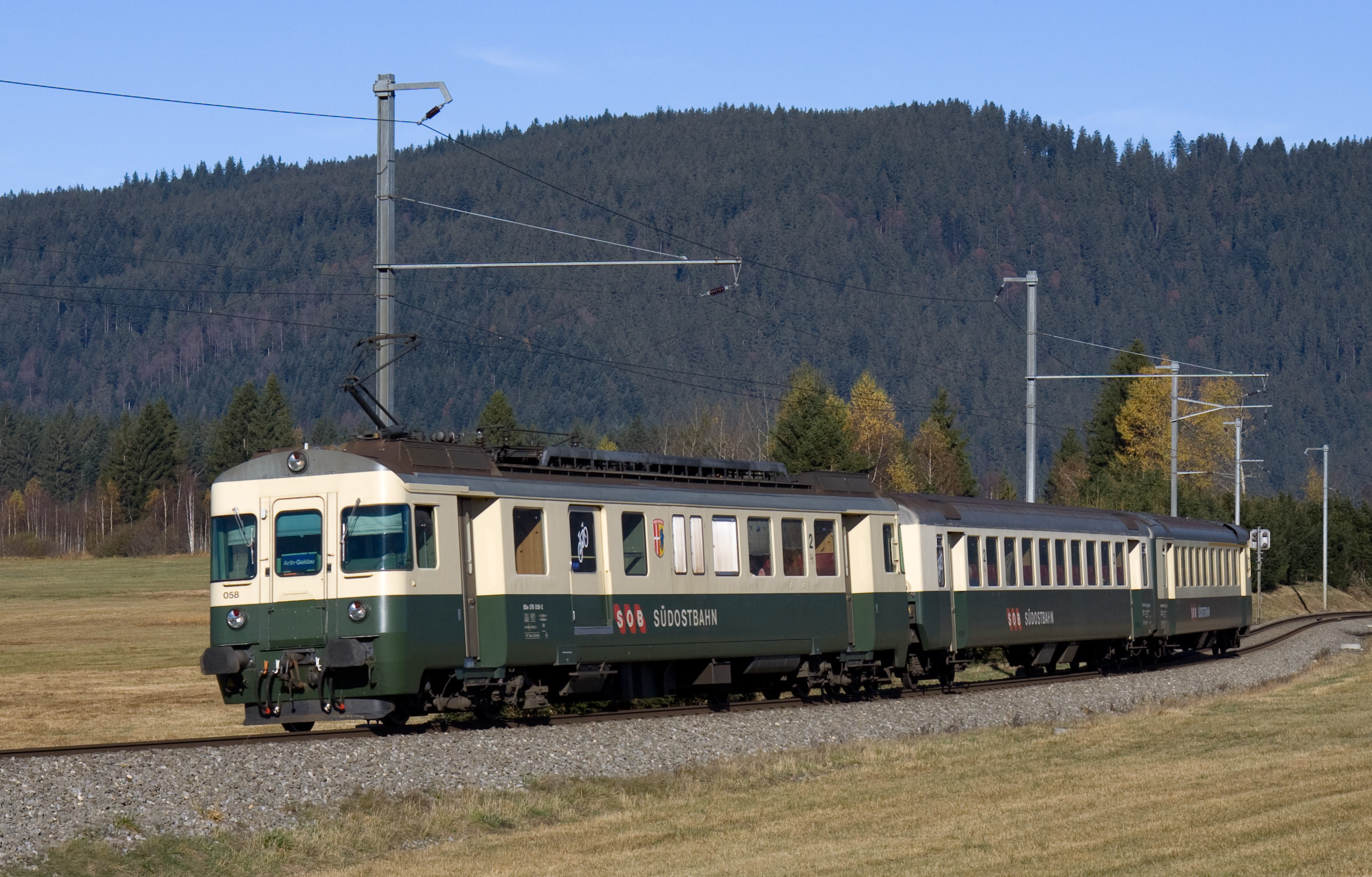
- BDe 4/4 58 Push-pull train between Biberbrugg and Altmatt

Overview
- Native name: Schweizerische Südostbahn
- Line number: 670, 672

Technical
- Line length: 49.201 km (30.572 mi)
- Track gauge: 1,435 mm (4 ft 8 1/2 in) standard gauge
- Electrification: 15 kV/16.7 Hz AC overhead catenary
- Maximum incline: 5%

The original Schweizerische Südostbahn (Swiss Southeastern Railway; SOB) was a railway company in Central Switzerland with its headquarters in Wädenswil. It was created in 1890 by the merger of the Wädenswil-Einsiedeln-Bahn and the Zürichsee–Gotthardbahn (Lake Zürich-Gotthard Railway) and operated the standard gauge adhesion railways on the Rapperswil–Arth-Goldau and the Wädenswil–Einsiedeln routes. It merged in 2001 with the Bodensee–Toggenburg railway (Bodensee-Toggenburg-Bahn) to form the "new" Südostbahn.

== History ==
=== Predecessors and construction ===
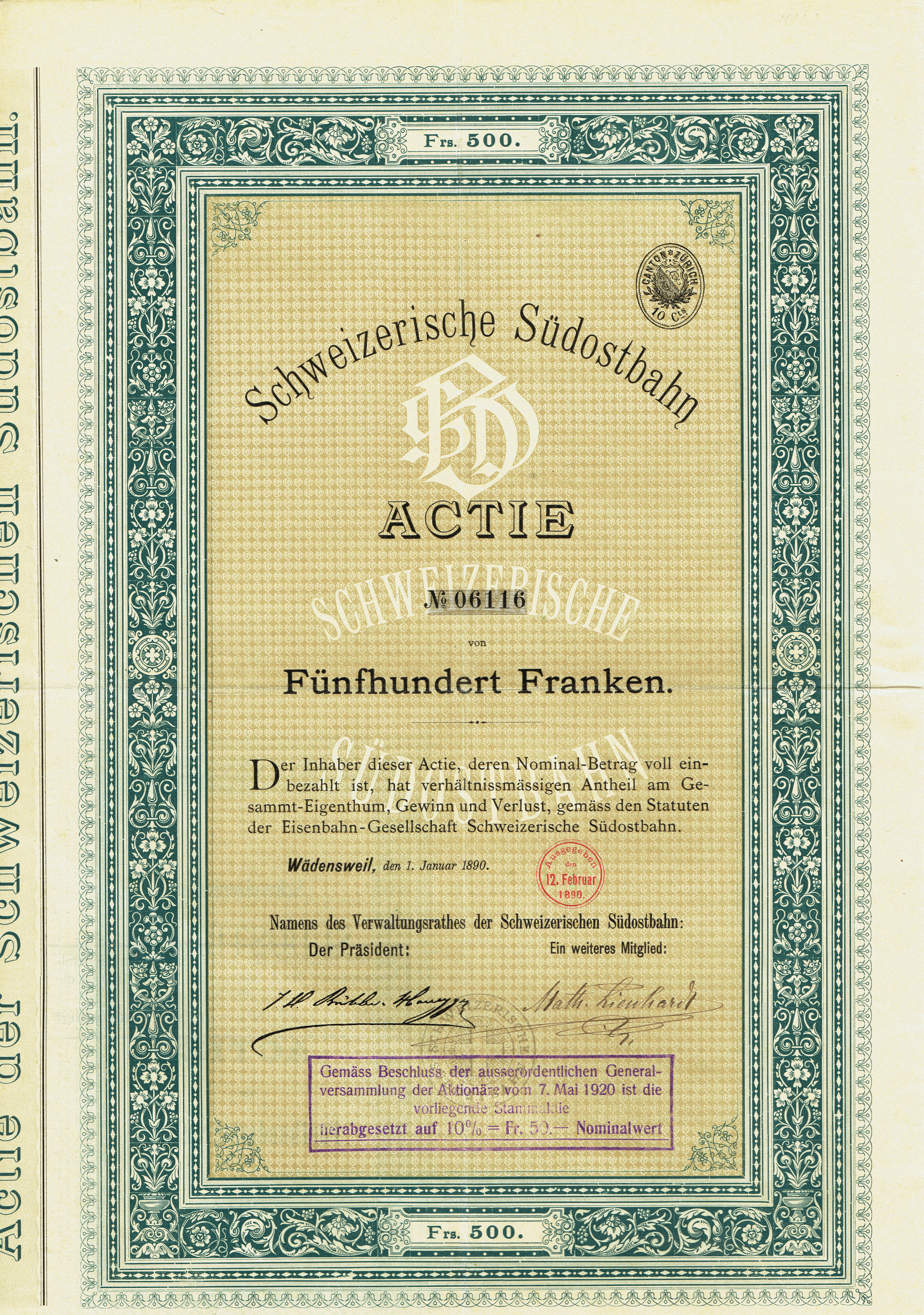
Original share of the Swiss Southeastern Railway worth 500 francs from 1 January 1890

The Wädenswil-Einsiedeln-Bahn (Wädenswil-Einsiedeln Railway; WE) opened the Wädenswil–Einsiedeln railway in 1877 to open up the pilgrimage site of Einsiedeln. Although the Uetliberg Railway had operated at a grade of more than 7.0% since 1875, the WE wanted to use a system called the Walzenradsystems Wetli (the Wetli Roller Wheel System) to increase the grip of the rail because of the expected substantial pilgrim traffic. A serious accident occurred during trials and the line ended up being operated as a normal adhesion railway. The company was not managed by itself, but operated under contract by the Swiss Northeastern Railway (Schweizerische Nordostbahn; NOB).

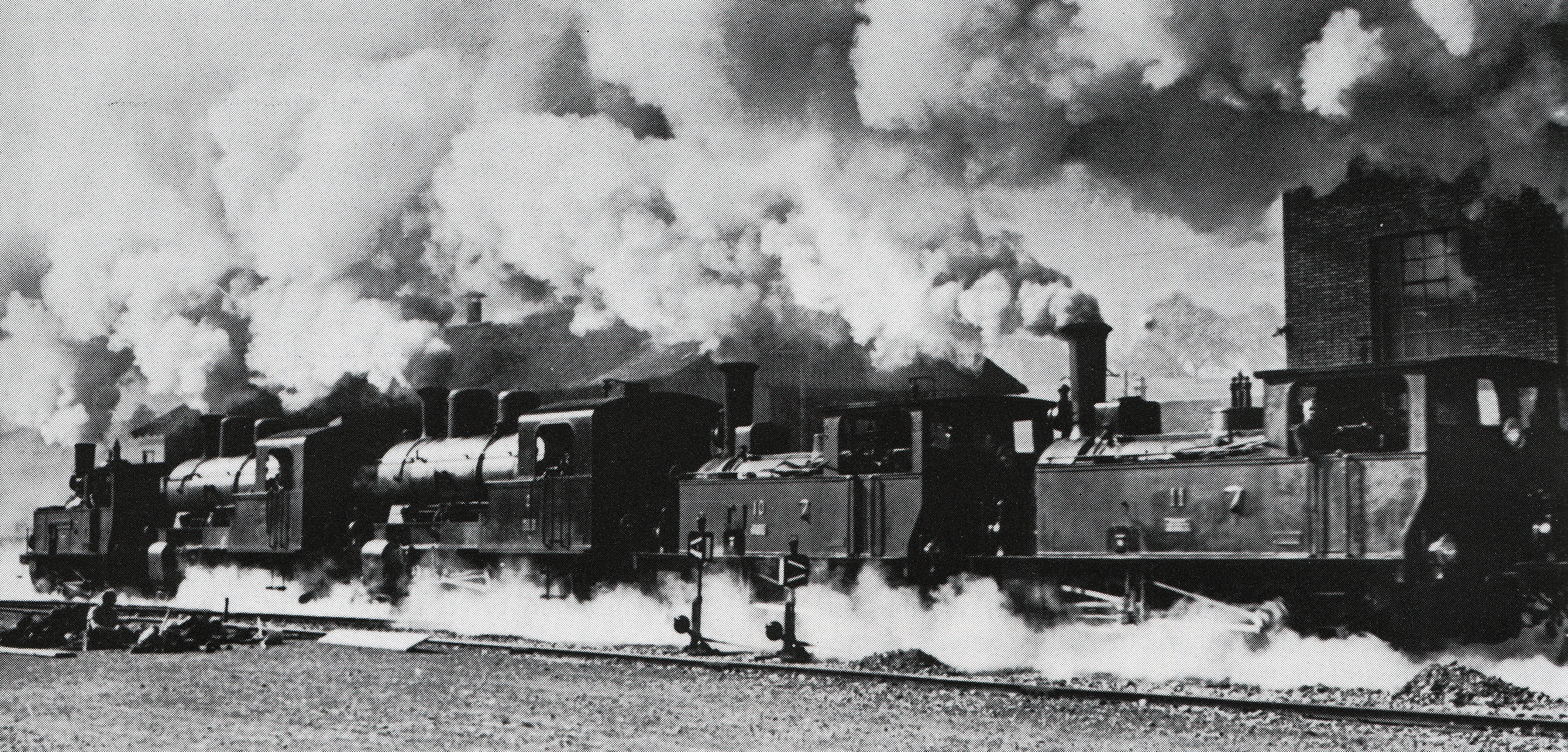
Five steam locomotives of the Südostbahn at Samstagern station; the last two are E 3/3 10 and 11.

The Zürichsee–Gotthardbahn (ZGB) opened the railway line via the newly built Seedamm from Rapperswil to Pfäffikon in 1878. Operations were contracted to the United Swiss Railways (Vereinigte Schweizerbahnen), a competitor of the NOB. The extension of the ZGB would establish a connection to the Gotthard Railway, which was then still under construction. When an initiative committee applied for a concession for a Pfäffikon–Arth-Goldau line, the ZGB sold it the land surveys that it had already carried out. Finally, on 12 August 1889, the Initiative Committee for Railway Construction from Biberbrugg to Arth-Goldau signed a merger agreement with the ZGB, the WE and an initiative committee for a line from Pfäffikon to Samstagern, so that on 1 January 1890 the two lines became the possession of the newly created Schweizerischen Südostbahn (SOB), which also took over the company. On 8 August 1891, it was able to open the Pfäffikon–Samstagern and Biberbrugg–Arth-Goldau lines, which connected Rapperswil to the Gotthard Railway.

Until the electrification of the line, the line was fairly busy and the SOB operated all services, although some pilgrimage and winter sports trains were hauled by Swiss Federal Railways (SBB) steam locomotives.

=== Electric operations ===
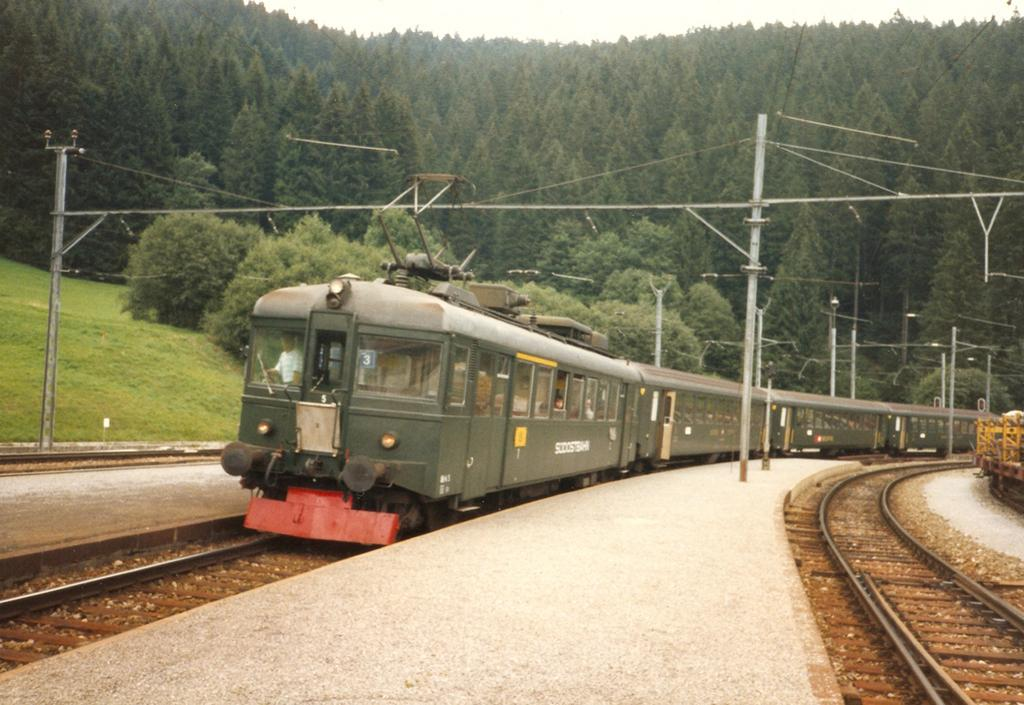
ABe 4/4 5 (formerly CFZe 4/4 12) power car with a passenger train in Biberbrugg.

Although the Südostbahn with its 5.0% gradients was ideal for electric operation, it was not until 1938 that financing could be secured for it. The company opted for the 15 000 V 16 2/3 Hz SBB system and immediately started construction of the overhead lines and traction equipment. The network was electrified within only ten months and electrical operations were started at the timetable change on 15 May 1939. The electricity was available from the Etzel works of the SBB. Because the eight CFZe 4/4 and BCFZe 4/4 railcars that had been ordered had not yet been delivered, the SOB had to rely on electric traction supplied by the SBB and the Bodensee–Toggenburg railway (Bodensee-Toggenburg-Bahn; BT).

The Südostbahn worked with BT and SBB from the start of electrical operation. There were direct trains from St. Gallen to Arth-Goldau, some of which were extended to Lucerne from 1945 and some included a dining car. This was called the Direkte Linie Nordostschweiz–Zentralschweiz (northeast Switzerland–central Switzerland direct line), now called the Voralpen-Express. The SOB provided traction units, locomotive drivers and the buffet car for the working day commuter trains on the Einsiedeln–Wädenswil–Zürich Altstetten route (the Gipfeli-Express).

The numerous special services often required SOB bank engines because of the large gradients. The winter sports and pilgrimage trains required up to four locomotives.

=== Merger with the Bodensee-Toggenburg railway ===
In order to improve its position at the start of the emerging public transport competition, discussions were held in 2002 for a merger with the BT, leading to a retroactive merger on 1 January 2001 to form the new Schweizerischen Südostbahn (SOB) based in St. Gallen. The two workshops in Samstagern and Herisau were preserved.

== Route network ==
The Pfäffikon SZ–Arth-Goldau line was the only line built by the Südostbahn. The adjoining sections were taken over from its two predecessor companies.

Section	Opened	Built by	Property length	Operating length
Wädenswil–Samstagern–Einsiedeln–Einsiedeln	1 May 1877	WE	16.413 km	16.624 km
Rapperswil–Pfäffikon SZ	27 August 1878	ZGB	3.510 km	3.978 km
Pfäffikon SZ–Samstagern and Biberbrugg–Arth-Goldau	8 August 1891	SOB	27.375 km	28.599 km
Total			47.298 km	49.201 km

Double track was put into operation on the Samstagern–Schindellegi-Feusisberg section on 28 April 1992.

Since the merger with the Bodensee-Toggenburg Railway, which can only be reached via the SBB Rapperswi–Wattwil line, the network of the "old" Südostbahn is referred to as the Südnetz (southern network).
