= Grüenfeld railway station =

Railway station in Richterswil, Switzerland

Grüenfeld
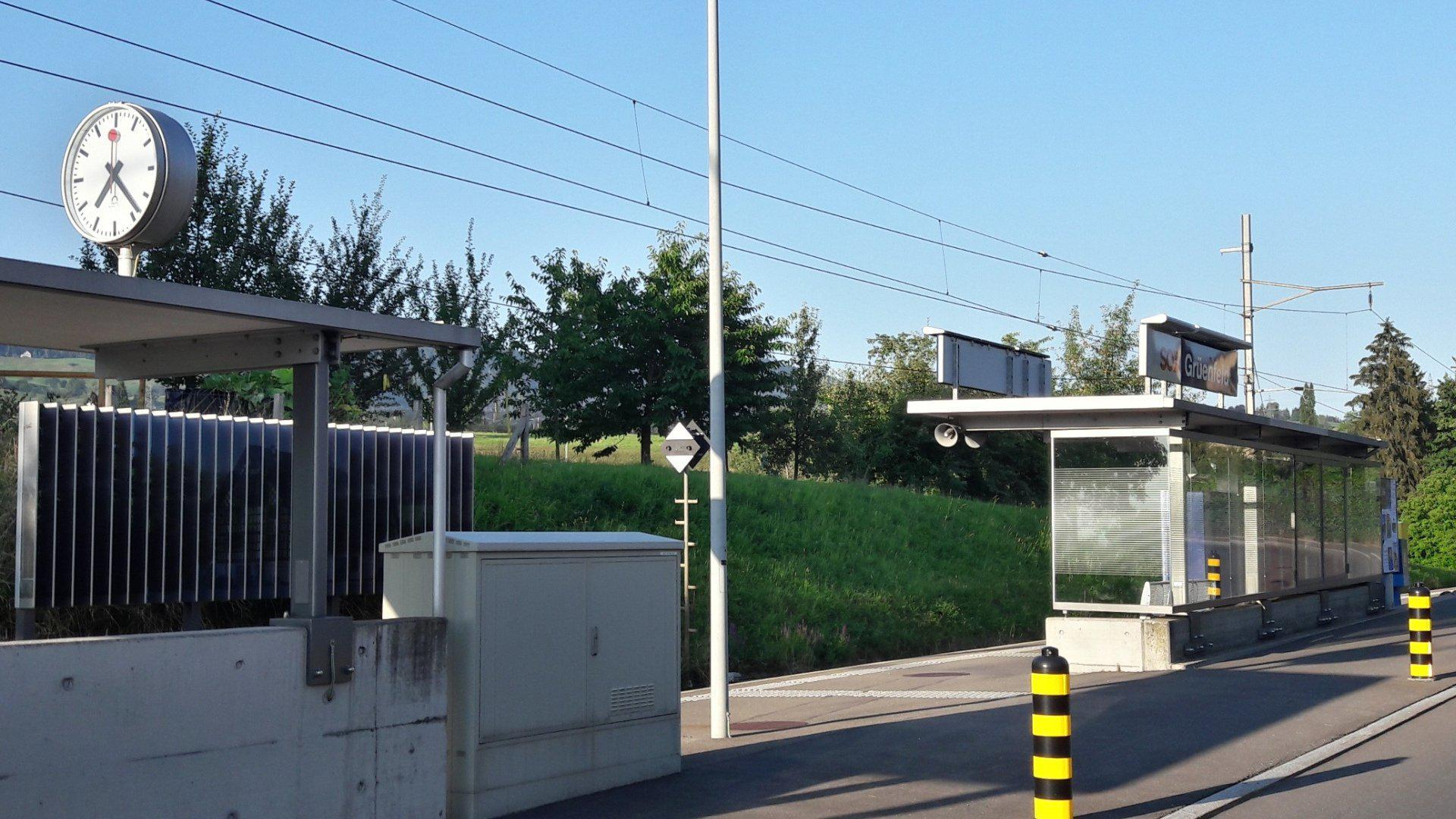
- The station in 2018

General information
- Location: Grüenfeld; Richterswil, Zurich; Switzerland
- Coordinates: 47.198344°N 8.687267°E
- Elevation: 590 m (1,940 ft)
- Owner: Südostbahn
- Operator: Südostbahn
- Line: Wädenswil–Einsiedeln
- Platforms: 1 side platform
- Tracks: 1

Other information
- Fare zone: 153 (ZVV)

Services
| Preceding station | Zurich S-Bahn | Following station |
|---|---|---|
| Burghalden towards Wädenswil | S13 | Samstagern towards Einsiedeln |
Location
- Location within Switzerland Location within Canton of Zurich

Grüenfeld is a railway station in the Swiss canton of Zurich and municipality of Richterswil. The station is on the Wädenswil to Einsiedeln railway line, owned by the Südostbahn, within fare zone 153 of the Zürcher Verkehrsverbund (ZVV).

== Services ==
The station is served by Zurich S-Bahn service S13, from Einsiedeln to Wädenswil. As of the December 2023 timetable change, the following services call at Grüenfeld:

- Zurich S-Bahn S13: half-hourly service between Wädenswil and Einsiedeln, via Biberbrugg

== See also ==
- Rail transport in Switzerland
