= Schindellegi-Feusisberg railway station =

Railway station in the canton of Schwyz, Switzerland

Schindellegi-Feusisberg
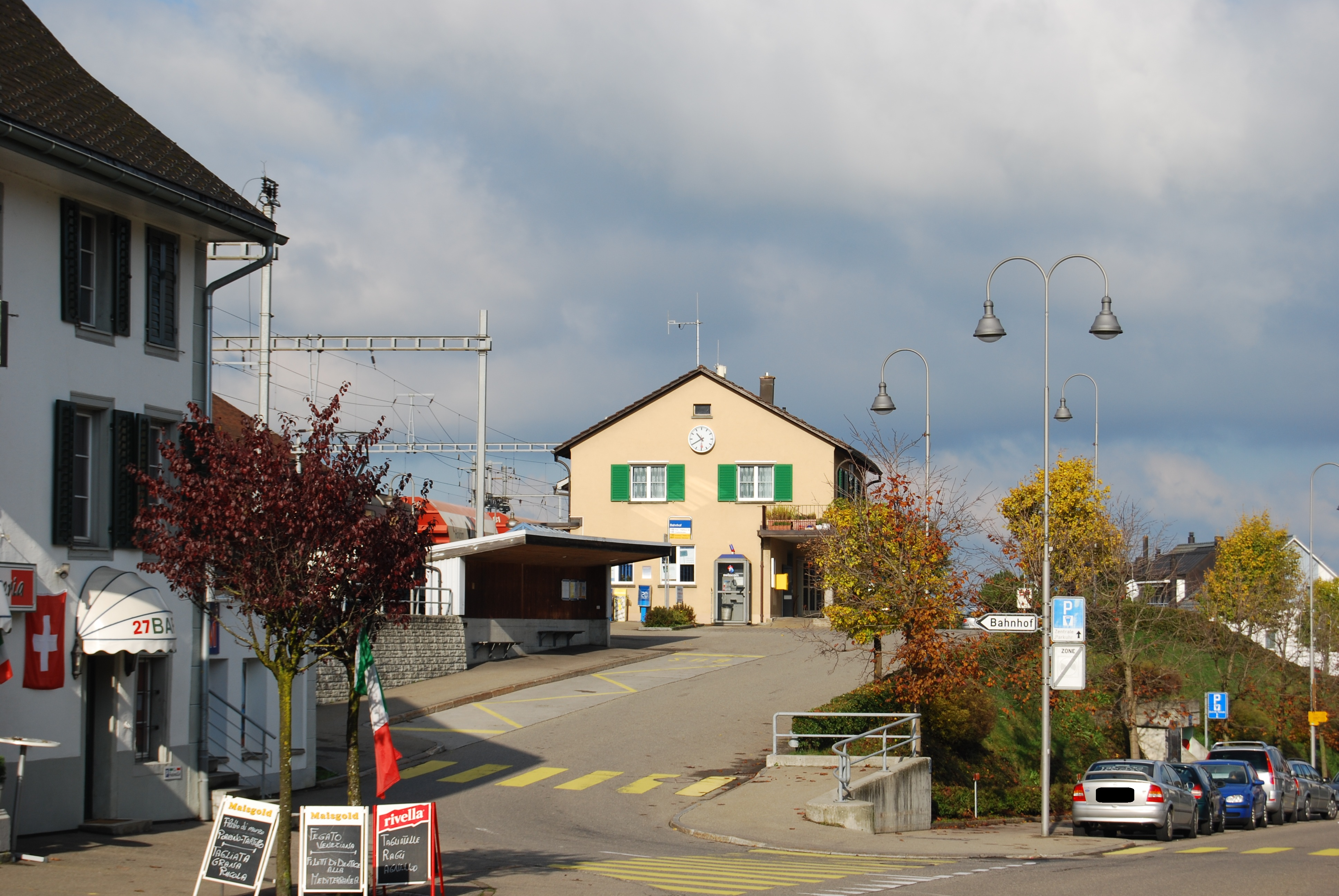
- The station building in 2010

General information
- Location: Schindellegi; Feusisberg, Schwyz; Switzerland
- Coordinates: 47.176109°N 8.709562°E
- Elevation: 755 m (2,477 ft)
- Owner: Südostbahn
- Operator: Südostbahn
- Lines: Pfäffikon SZ–Arth-Goldau; Wädenswil–Einsiedeln
- Platforms: 1 island platform
- Tracks: 3
- Connections
- Bus: PostAuto bus routes 190

Other information
- Fare zone: 181 (ZVV); 680 (Tarifverbund Schwyz)

Services
Preceding station	Zurich S-Bahn	Following station
Samstagern towards Wädenswil	S13	Biberbrugg towards Einsiedeln
Samstagern towards Rapperswil	S40	Biberbrugg towards Einsiedeln
Location
- Location within Switzerland Location within Canton of Schwyz

Schindellegi-Feusisberg is a railway station in the Swiss canton of Schwyz and municipality of Feusisberg. It takes its name from the nearby village of Schindellegi. The station is on the Pfäffikon SZ to Arth-Goldau line, and the Wädenswil to Einsiedeln railway line, which are both owned by the Südostbahn. It lies within both fare zone 181 of the Zürcher Verkehrsverbund (ZVV) and fare zone 680 of the Tarifverbund Schwyz (Schwyz tariff group).

== Services ==
The station is served by Zurich S-Bahn services S13, from Einsiedeln to Wädenswil, and S40, from Einsiedeln to Rapperswil. As of the December 2023 timetable change, the following services call at Schindellegi-Feusisberg:

- Zurich S-Bahn
  - S13: half-hourly service between Wädenswil and Einsiedeln, via Biberbrugg
  - S40: half-hourly service between Rapperswil and Einsiedeln, via Biberbrugg

== See also ==
- Rail transport in Switzerland
