= Biberbrugg =

- Municipality
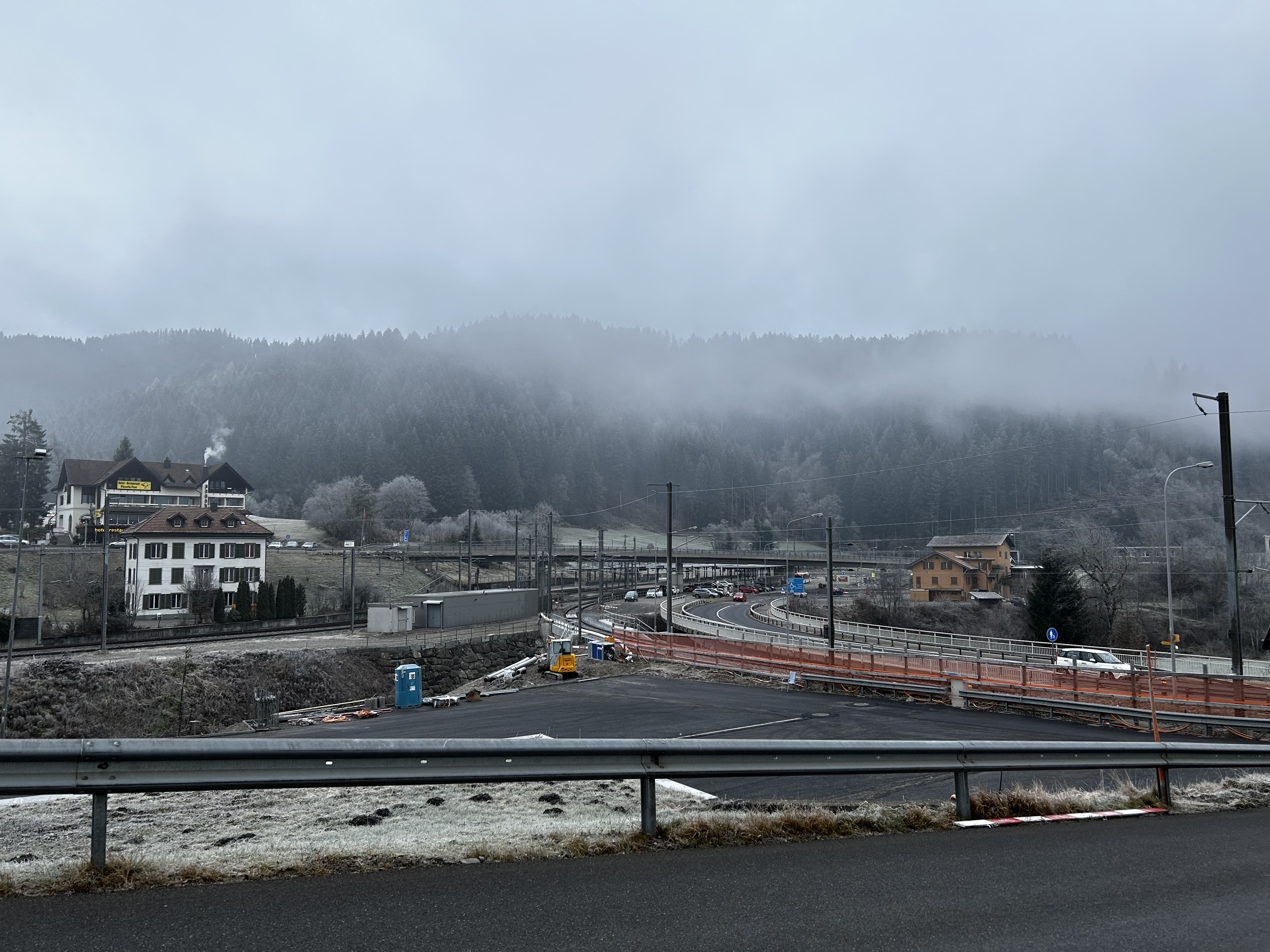
- Location of Biberbrugg
- Location within Switzerland Location within Canton of Schwyz
- Coordinates: 47°9′N 8°43′E
- Country: Switzerland
- Canton: Schwyz
- District: Einsiedeln, Höfe
- Municipality: Einsiedeln and Feusisberg
- Elevation: 838 m (2,749 ft)
- Time zone: UTC+01:00 (CET)
  - Summer (DST): UTC+02:00 (CEST)
- Postal code: 8836
- SFOS number: 1321
- ISO 3166 code: CH-SZ
- Surrounded by: Einsiedeln, Feusisberg
- Website: www.einsiedeln.ch

Biberbrugg is a village in the canton of Schwyz in Switzerland. It is shared by the municipality and district of Einsiedeln and the municipality of Feusisberg in the district of Höfe.

== History ==
For centuries, the village was a small hamlet with a bridge (Swiss German: Brugg) crossing the Biber river, just upstream of its confluence with the Alp river.

In 1877, a train station on the line Wädenswil–Einsiedeln railway was built, carrying the name of the village. Fourteen years later, the Südostbahn established the line Pfäffikon–Arth-Goldau railway line, and Biberbrugg became an important junction station. Around the train station, a settlement in the municipality of Einsiedeln was established on the southern side of the Biber river. Later, the motorway St. Gallen–Rapperswil–Schwyz–Ingenbohl on the western side of the river was built; this part of the village belongs to the municipality of Feusisberg.

== Transport ==
Biberbrugg is a nodal point of the Südostbahn's Voralpen Express, an InterRegio train, and of the motorway between St. Gallen and Schwyz. The railway station is also an intermediate stop of Zürich S-Bahn lines S13 to Wädenswil and S40 to Rapperswil.
