= Burghalden railway station =

Railway station in the canton of Zürich, Switzerland

Burghalden
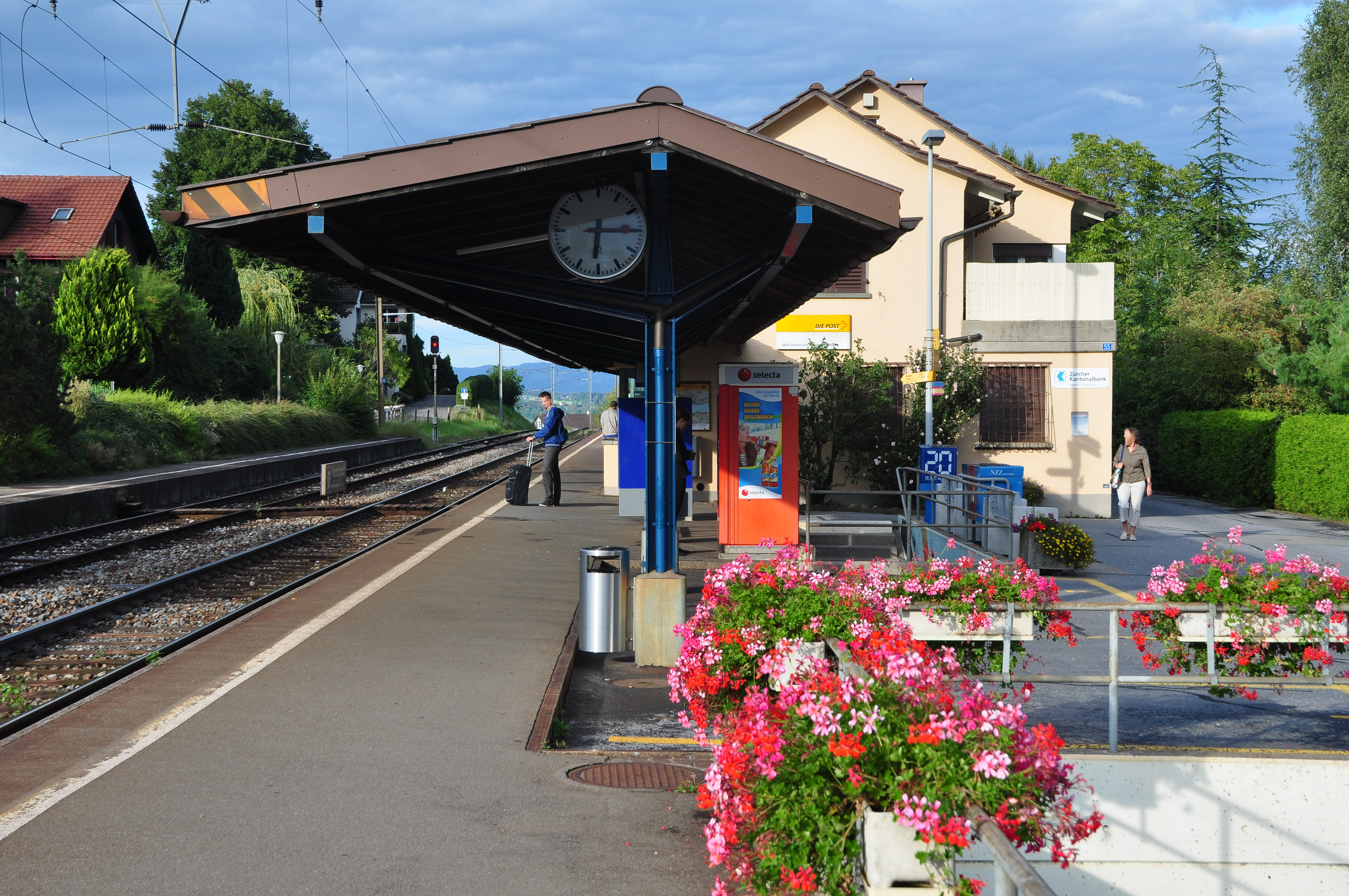

General information
- Location: Burghalden; Richterswil, Zurich; Switzerland
- Coordinates: 47.208658°N 8.692862°E
- Elevation: 530 m (1,740 ft)
- Owner: Südostbahn
- Operator: Südostbahn
- Line: Wädenswil–Einsiedeln
- Platforms: 2 side platforms
- Tracks: 2

Other information
- Fare zone: 153 (ZVV)

Services
Preceding station	Zurich S-Bahn	Following station
Wädenswil Terminus	S13	Grüenfeld towards Einsiedeln
Location
- Location within Switzerland Location within Canton of Zurich

Burghalden is a railway station in the Swiss canton of Zurich and municipality of Richterswil. It is located on the Südostbahn's Wädenswil to Einsiedeln line, within fare zone 153 of the Zürcher Verkehrsverbund (ZVV).

== Services ==
The station is served by Zurich S-Bahn line S13. As of the December 2023 timetable change, the following services call at Burghalden:

- Zurich S-Bahn S13: half-hourly service between Wädenswil and Einsiedeln, via Biberbrugg

== See also ==
- Rail transport in Switzerland
