= Samstagern railway station =

Railway station in Richterswil, Switzerland

Samstagern
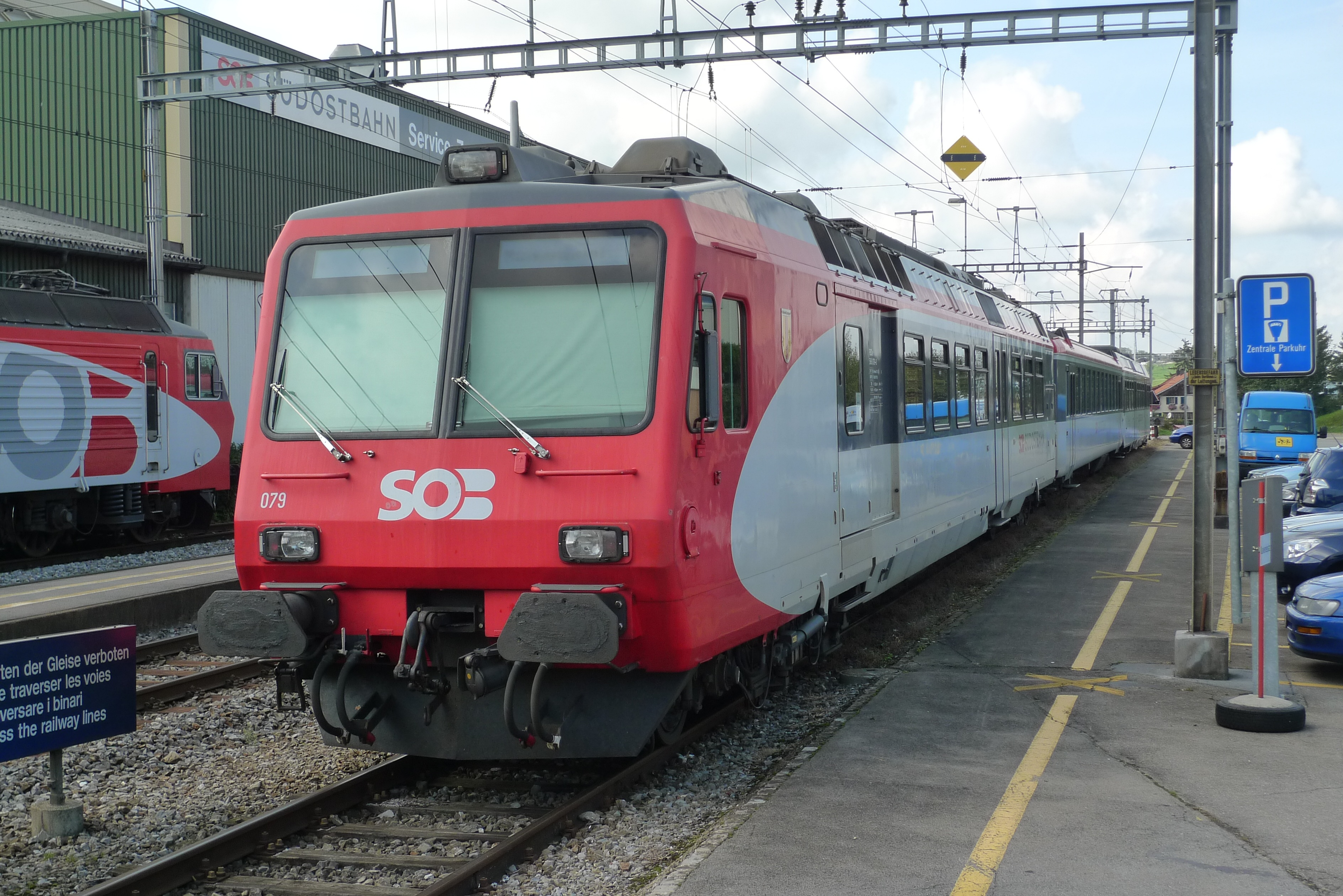
- Samstagern railway station with NPZ train

General information
- Location: Stationstrasse, Samstagern; Richterswil, Zurich; Switzerland
- Coordinates: 47.191302°N 8.686044°E
- Elevation: 629 m (2,064 ft)
- Owner: Südostbahn
- Operator: Südostbahn
- Lines: Pfäffikon SZ–Arth-Goldau; Wädenswil–Einsiedeln
- Connections
- Bus: PostAuto bus routes 180

Other information
- Fare zone: 153 (ZVV)

Services
Preceding station	Zurich S-Bahn	Following station
Grüenfeld towards Wädenswil	S13	Schindellegi-Feusisberg towards Einsiedeln
Riedmatt towards Rapperswil	S40	Schindellegi-Feusisberg towards Einsiedeln
Location
- Location within Switzerland Location within Canton of Zurich

Samstagern is a railway station in the Swiss canton of Zurich and municipality of Richterswil. It takes its name from the nearby village of Samstagern. The station is on the Pfäffikon SZ to Arth-Goldau line, and the Wädenswil to Einsiedeln railway line, which are both owned by the Südostbahn. The two lines separate to the northwest of the station. The statio lies within fare zone 153 of the Zürcher Verkehrsverbund (ZVV).

The station is the location of a Südostbahn railway depot and workshop.

== Services ==
The station is served by Zurich S-Bahn services S13, from Einsiedeln to Wädenswil, and S40, from Einsiedeln to Rapperswil. As of the December 2023 timetable change, the following services call at Samstagern:

- Zurich S-Bahn
  - S13: half-hourly service between Wädenswil and Einsiedeln, via Biberbrugg
  - S40: half-hourly service between Rapperswil and Einsiedeln, via Biberbrugg

== See also ==
- Rail transport in Switzerland
