= Karin Ott =

Swiss operatic soprano

Karin Ott (born 13 December 1945) is a Swiss operatic coloratura soprano.

Born in Wädenswil near Zürich as the daughter of a doctor, as a child she studied piano, violin, then organ, and later attended the International Opera Studio at Zürich. Her first engagement was in Biel, where she sang the soprano roles in Rigoletto, La bohème (as Mimì), Die Entführung aus dem Serail (as Konstanze), and The Bartered Bride (as Marie). She has appeared with various European companies, including the Deutsche Oper Berlin, where she sang in La bohème (now as Musetta, with Enrico Di Giuseppe, 1982), Don Pasquale (as Norina, 1984), La bohème again (1985), and Lucia di Lammermoor (1985). At the Staatsoper Stuttgart, she was in the world premiere of the original version of Henze's König Hirsch in 1985. She also sang with the companies in Vienna, Munich, Paris, Zurich, Rome, Naples, Barcelona, Brussels, Amsterdam, Bordeaux, and Marseille. In concert, she has been heard in London, Milan, Salzburg, and Venice. In 1979, she performed Lucia in the United States.

Ott's discography includes songs by Pauline Viardot (1987–88), Lili Boulanger (1991), Carl Loewe, and Carl Maria von Weber, as well as Schoenberg's Pierrot Lunaire (live, 1990–94). In 1980, the soprano recorded her best-known role for Deutsche Grammophon, the Queen of Night in Mozart's Die Zauberflöte, with Edith Mathis, Janet Perry, Francisco Araiza, and José van Dam, under the baton of Herbert von Karajan.

Besides von Karajan, Ott has sung under Gerd Albrecht, Karl Böhm, Pierre Boulez, Michael Gielen, Ferdinand Leitner, Jesús López-Cobos, Sir Charles Mackerras, Wolfgang Sawallisch, Giuseppe Sinopoli, etc.
