= List of mayors of Wädenswil =

Coat of arms of Wädenswil

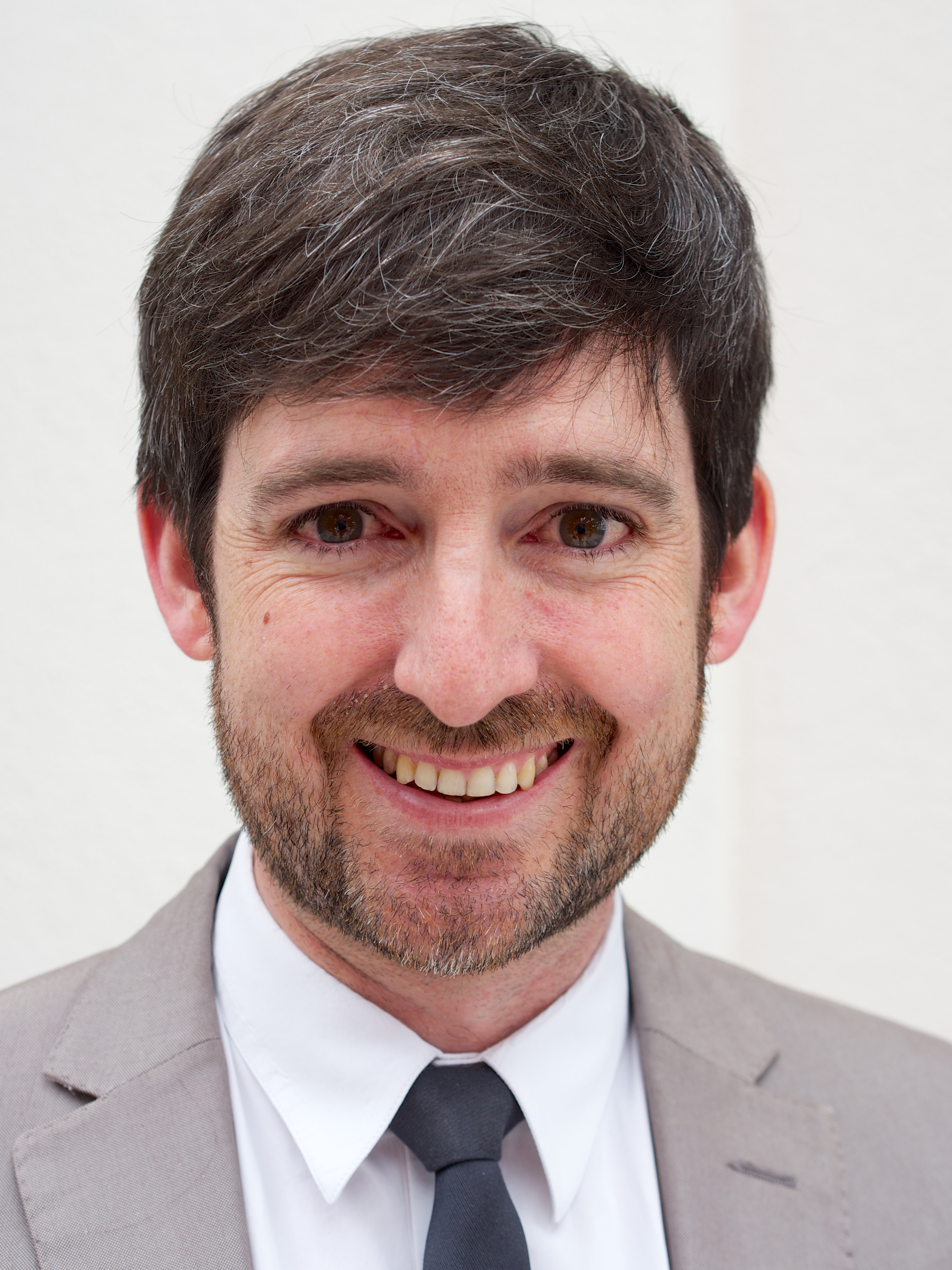
Philipp Kutter, Mayor of Wädenswil, 2014

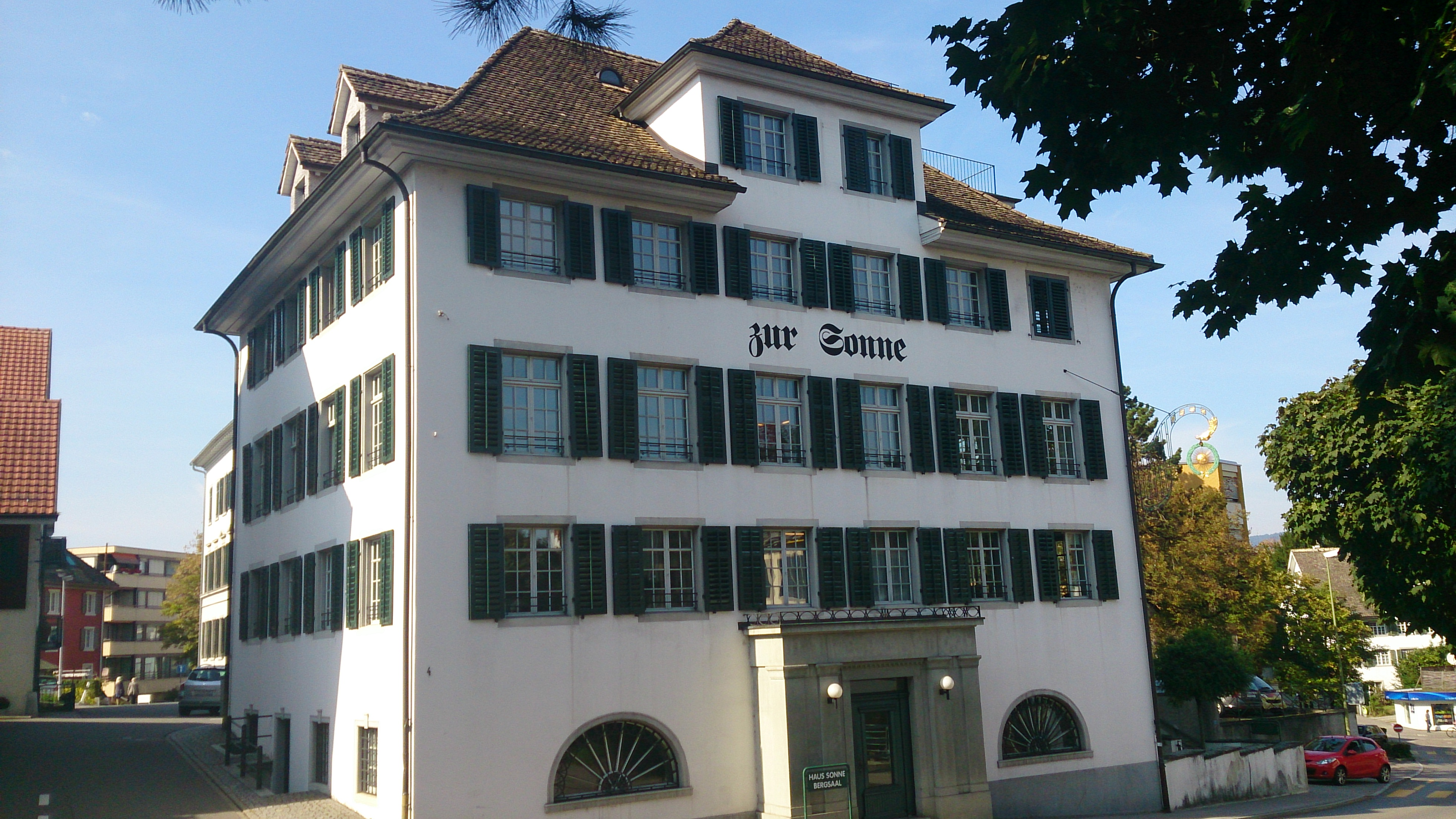
Haus Zur Sonne, former Gemeindehaus

This is a list of mayors of Wädenswil, a municipality in the Canton of Zürich, Switzerland. The mayor of Wädenswil (Stadtpräsident von Wädenswil) chairs the city council (Stadtrat). Before the town had city status, the term Gemeindepräsident was used for the mayor.

Mayor of Wädenswil
Term	Mayor	Lifespan	Party	Notes
1958–1974	Fritz Störi			
1974–1986	Walter Rusterholz			
1986–1994	Walter Höhn			
1994–2006	Ueli Fausch			
2006–2010	Ernst Stocker	(born 1955)	SVP/UDC	
2010–present	Philipp Kutter	(born 1975)	CVP/PDC	
