= Feusisberg =

- Municipality
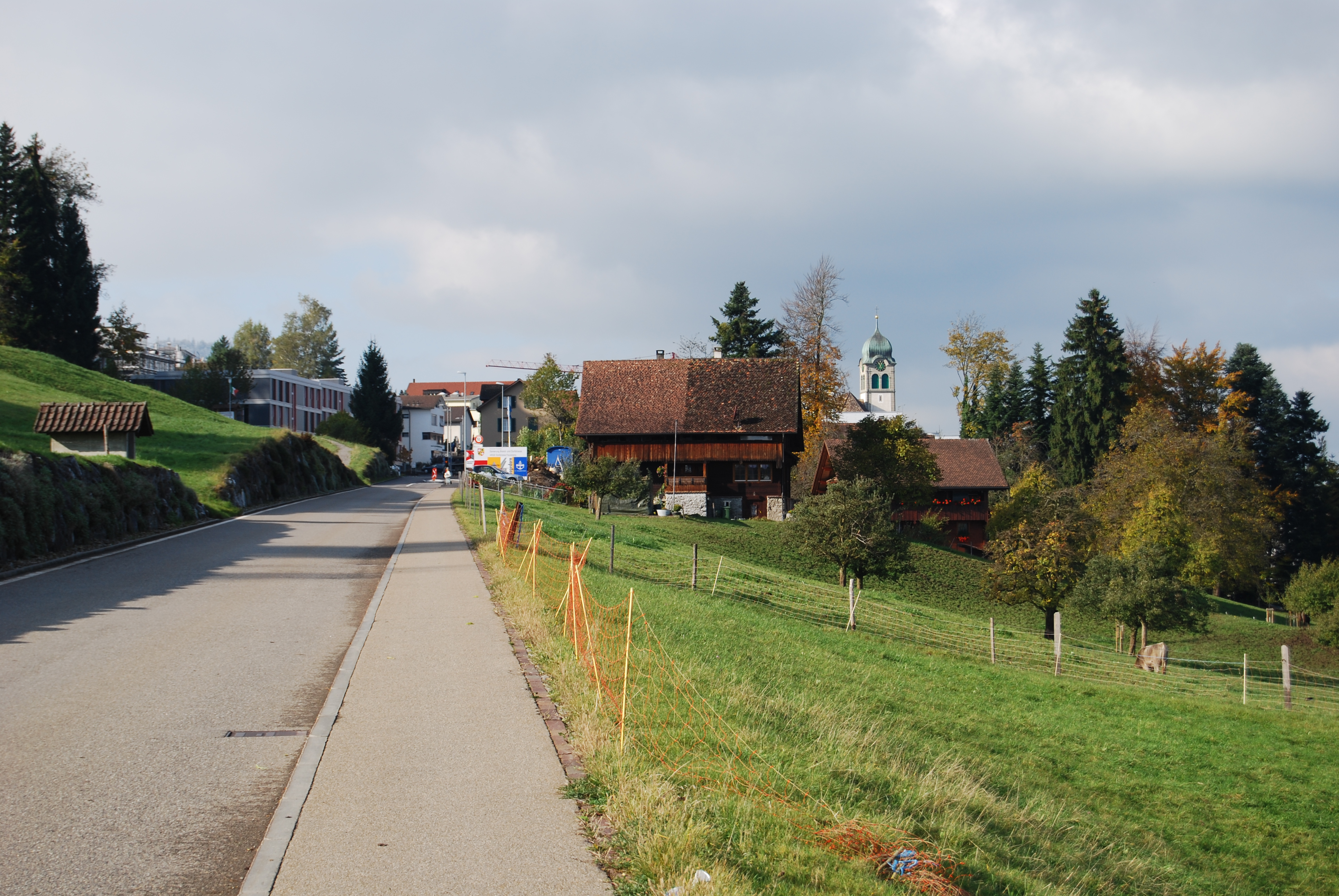

- Coat of arms
- Location of Feusisberg
- Location within Switzerland Location within Canton of Schwyz
- Coordinates: 47°11′N 8°45′E
- Country: Switzerland
- Canton: Schwyz
- District: Höfe

Area
  - Total: 17.56 km^{2} (6.78 sq mi)
- Elevation: 685 m (2,247 ft)

Population (December 2020)
  - Total: 5,427
  - Density: 309.1/km^{2} (800.4/sq mi)
- Time zone: UTC+01:00 (CET)
  - Summer (DST): UTC+02:00 (CEST)
- Postal code: 8835
- SFOS number: 1321
- ISO 3166 code: CH-SZ
- Localities: Biberbrugg, Schindellegi
- Surrounded by: Einsiedeln, Freienbach, Hütten (ZH), Oberägeri (ZG), Wollerau
- Website: www.feusisberg.ch

Feusisberg is a municipality in Höfe District in the canton of Schwyz in Switzerland.

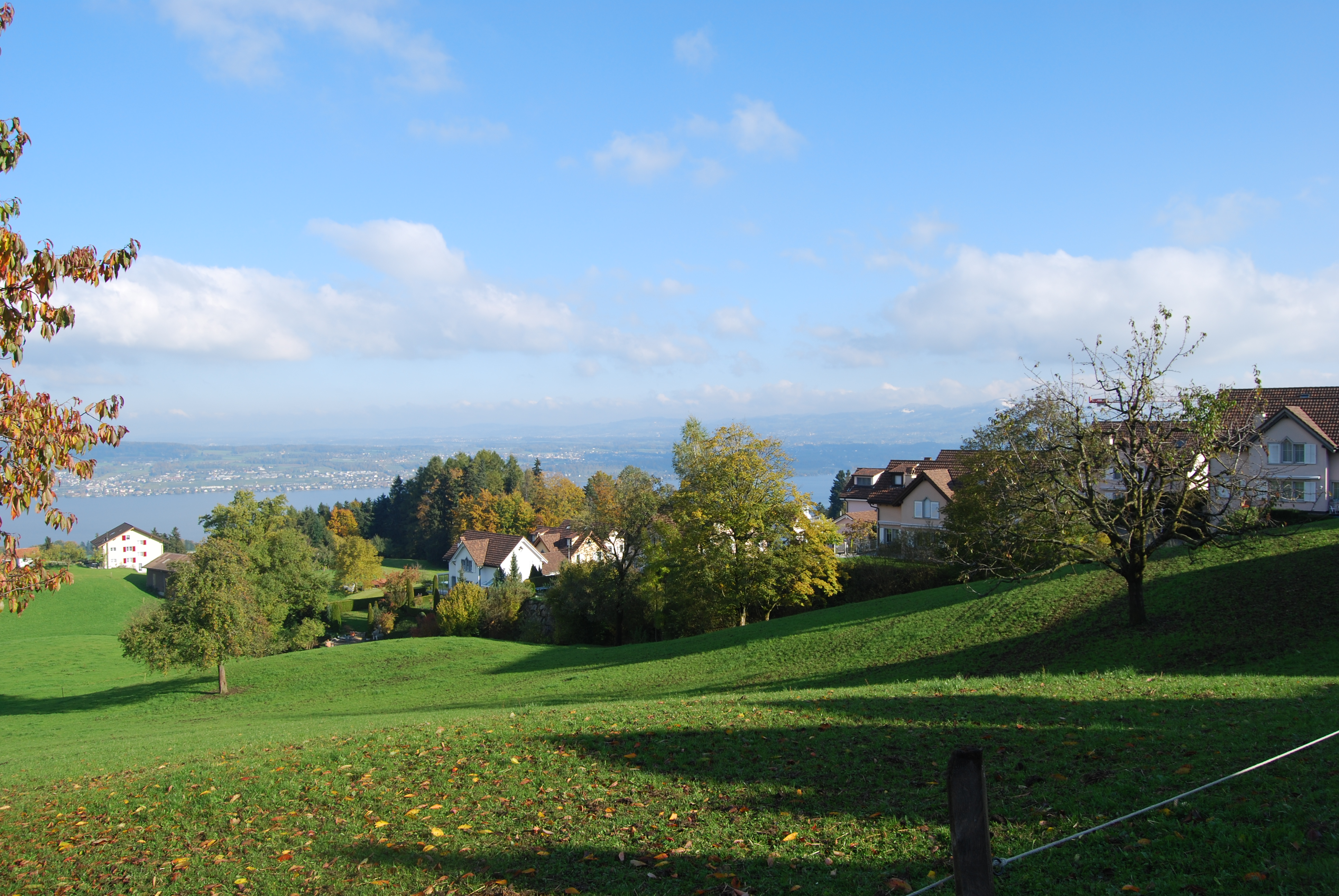
Feusisberg

== History ==
Feusisberg is first mentioned in the 13th century as Berg and Uffenberg. In the 16th century it was known as Fessisskilch and in 1590 it was mentioned as Föussisberg.

== Geography ==
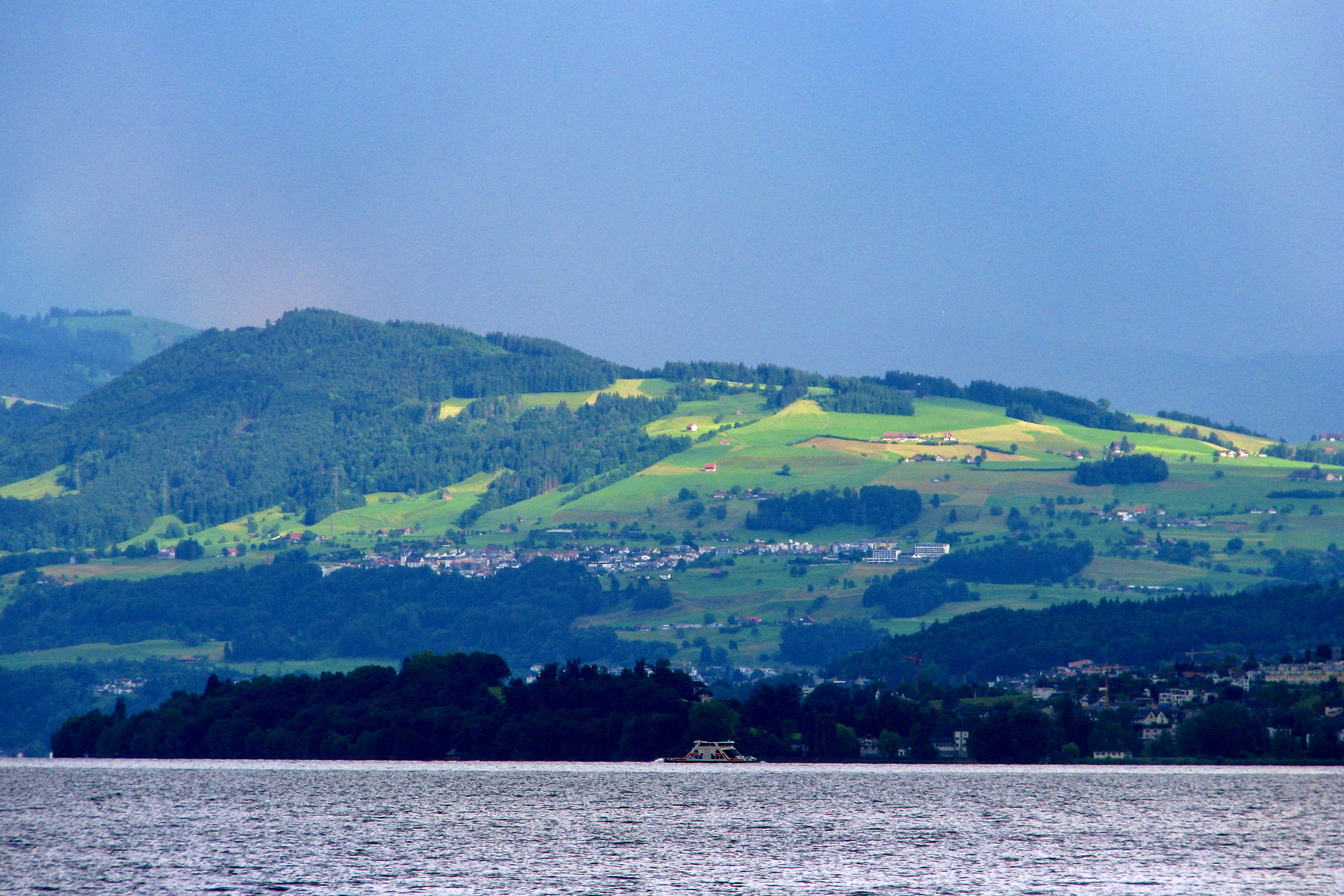
Feusisberg and Etzel (mountain) as seen from Lake Zürich

Aerial view (1953)

Feusisberg has an area, as of 2006, of 17.5 km^{2} (6.8 sq mi). Of this area, 48.8% is used for agricultural purposes, while 41.2% is forested. Of the rest of the land, 8.6% is settled (buildings or roads) and the remainder (1.4%) is non-productive (rivers, glaciers or mountains).

The municipality is located on a terrace below the Etzel mountain and overlooking Lake Zurich at an elevation of between 600–800 meters (2,000–2,600 ft) above sea level. It consists of the villages of Feusisberg and Schindellegi as well as part of Biberbrugg. As of 2000 about two-thirds of the population of the municipality lived in Schindellegi.

== Demographics ==
Feusisberg has a population (as of 31 December 2020) of 5,427. As of 2007, 20.0% of the population was made up of foreign nationals. Over the last 10 years the population has grown at a rate of 32.8%. In 2000, the vast majority of the population (91.1%) spoke German.

As of 2000 the gender distribution of the population was 50.9% male and 49.1% female. The age distribution, as of 2008, in Feusisberg is; 881 people or 23.3% of the population is between 0 and 19. 1,086 people or 28.7% are 20 to 39, and 1,340 people or 35.5% are 40 to 64. The senior population distribution is 244 people or 6.5% are 65 to 74. There are 169 people or 4.5% who are 70 to 79 and 59 people or 1.56% of the population who are over 80.

As of 2000 there were 1,577 households, of which 490 households (or about 31.1%) contained only a single individual. A total of 83, or about 5.3%, were large households with at least five members.

In the 2007 election the most popular party was the SVP which received 46.6% of the vote. The next three most popular parties were the FDP (22.8%), the CVP (13.5%) and the SPS (12.5%).

In Feusisberg about 74.2% of the population (between age 25 and 64) have completed either non-mandatory upper secondary education or additional higher education (either university or a Fachhochschule).

Feusisberg has an unemployment rate of 1.55%. In 2005, there were 199 people employed in the primary economic sector and about 77 businesses involved in this sector. 444 people are employed in the secondary sector and there are 84 businesses in this sector. 1,010 people are employed in the tertiary sector, with 183 businesses in this sector.

From the 2000 census, 2,342 or 62.0% are Roman Catholic, while 782 or 20.7% belonged to the Swiss Reformed Church. Of the rest of the population, there are less than 5 individuals who belong to the Christian Catholic faith, there are 30 individuals (or about 0.79% of the population) who belong to the Orthodox Church, and there are 11 individuals (or about 0.29% of the population) who belong to another Christian church. There are 5 individuals (or about 0.13% of the population) who are Jewish, and 161 (or about 4.26% of the population) who are Islamic. There are 16 individuals (or about 0.42% of the population) who belong to another church (not listed on the census), 338 (or about 8.94% of the population) belong to no church, are agnostic or atheist, and 92 individuals (or about 2.43% of the population) did not answer the question.

The historical population is given in the following table:

year	population
1743	649
1850	991
1900	1,276
1950	1,654
1970	2,173
1980	2,833
1985	2,951
1990	3,178
2000	3,765
2005	4,291
2007	4,593

== Transportation ==
The municipality is located on the A3 motorway. There are two railway stops within the municipality, Biberbrugg station and Schindellegi-Feusisberg station, both of which are served by Zurich S-Bahn services S13 and S40. Biberbrugg is also served by the Voralpen Express.
