= S13 (ZVV) =

Railway service in Switzerland

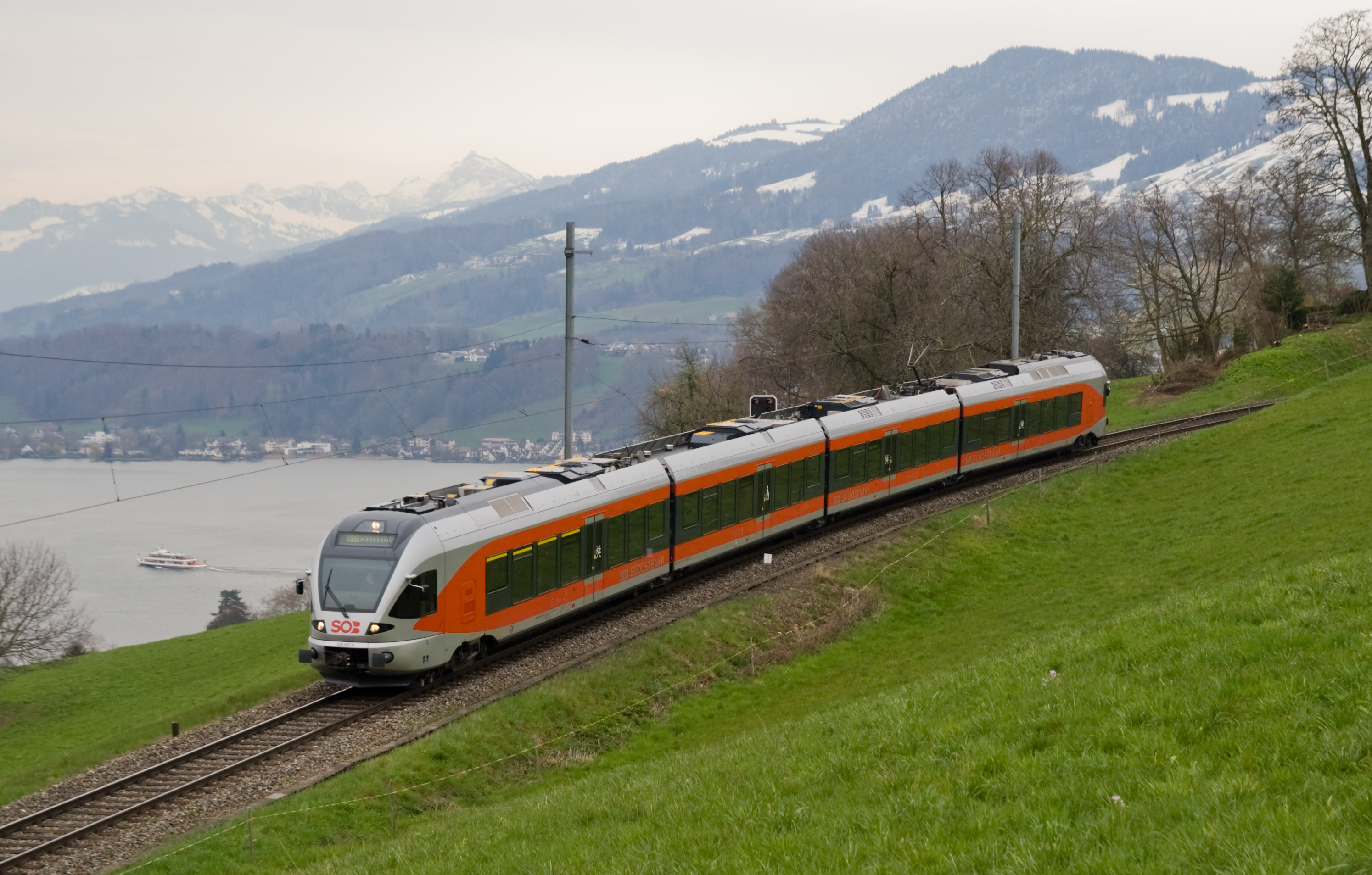
- A SOB train on line S13 descending towards Wädenswil.

Overview
- Status: Operational
- Locale: Switzerland
- Termini: Einsiedeln; Wädenswil
- Stations: 7
- Website: ZVV (in English)

Service
- Type: S-Bahn
- System: Zurich S-Bahn
- Operator(s): Zürcher Verkehrsverbund (ZVV)
- Rolling stock: Stadler Flirt EMUs

Technical
- Track gauge: 1,435 mm (4 ft 8 1/2 in)

Zurich S-Bahn network as of December 2018

The S13 is a regional railway line of the S-Bahn Zurich on the Zürcher Verkehrsverbund (ZVV), Zurich transportation network, in the cantons of Schwyz and Zurich. It links Einsiedeln with Biberbrugg and Wädenswil junction stations.

== Route ==
- S13 Wädenswil–Samstagern–Einsiedeln

The line runs from Einsiedeln (SZ) to Wädenswil (ZH) on the Wädenswil–Einsiedeln railway line. Unlike other Zurich S-Bahn lines, it does not pass through Zürich HB. Connecting trains are offered at Biberbrugg (S31, S40, Voralpen-Express) and Wädenswil (S2, S8, S25, InterRegios).

The S13 is operated with single-deck Stadler FLIRT and FLIRT-III EMUs owned by Südostbahn (SOB).

== Stations ==
- Einsiedeln
- Biberbrugg
- Schindellegi-Feusisberg
- Samstagern
- Grüenfeld
- Burghalden
- Wädenswil

== Scheduling ==
The train frequency is usually 30 minutes and the trip takes 24 minutes.

== See also ==
- Rail transport in Switzerland
- Public transport in Zurich
- ZVV fare zones
