= Einsiedeln railway station =

Railway station in Switzerland

Einsiedeln
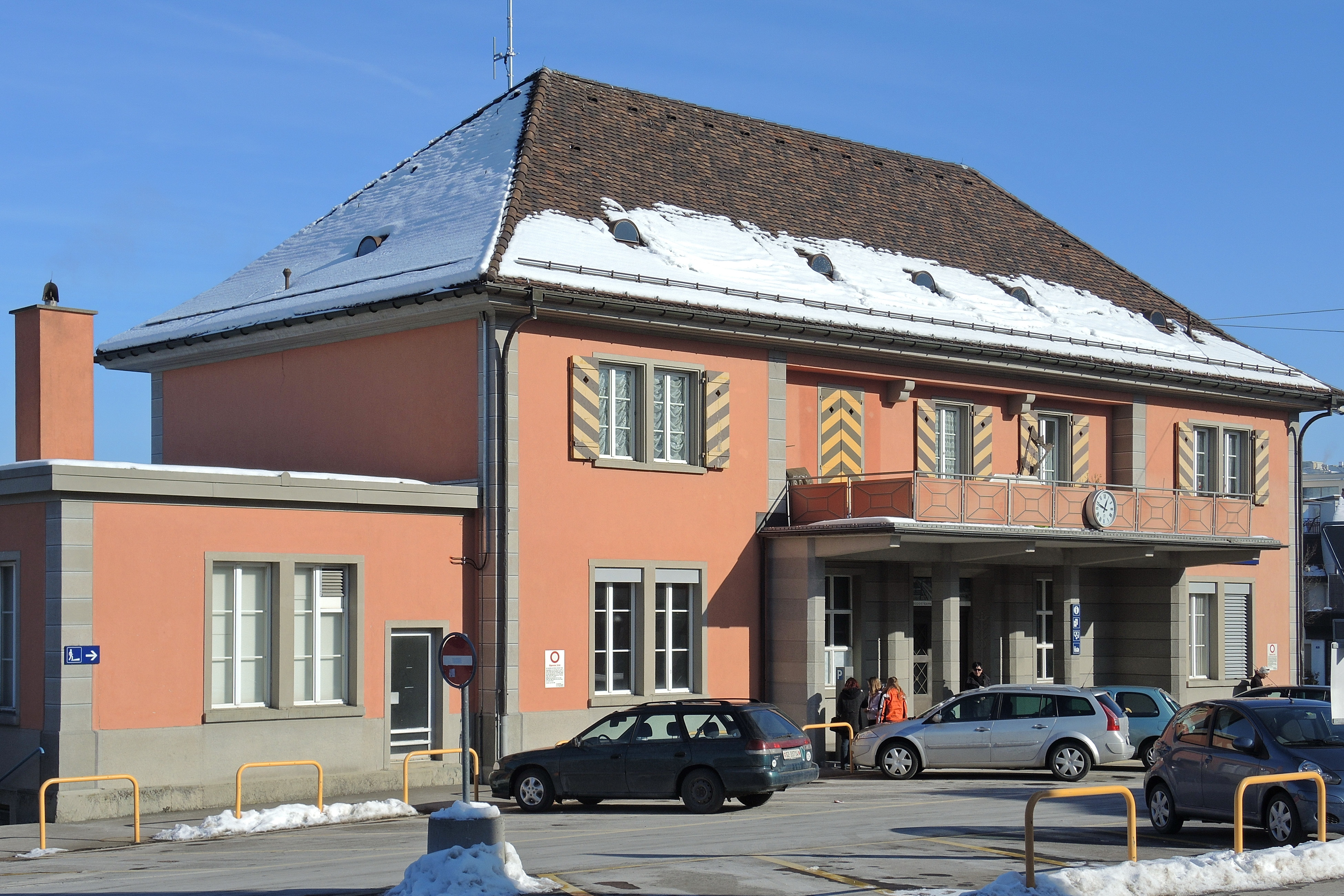

General information
- Location: Bahnhofplatz; Einsiedeln, Schwyz; Switzerland
- Coordinates: 47.128316°N 8.744838°E
- Elevation: 881 m (2,890 ft)
- Owner: Südostbahn
- Operator: Südostbahn
- Line: Wädenswil–Einsiedeln
- Connections
- Bus: PostAuto bus routes 551 552 553 554 555

Other information
- Fare zone: 679 (Tarifverbund Schwyz)

Services
Preceding station	Zurich S-Bahn	Following station
Biberbrugg towards Wädenswil	S13	Terminus
Biberbrugg towards Rapperswil	S40	Terminus
Location
- Location within Switzerland Location within Canton of Schwyz

Einsiedeln is a railway station in the Swiss canton of Schwyz and municipality of Einsiedeln. The station is the southern terminus of the Wädenswil to Einsiedeln railway line, which is owned by the Südostbahn (SOB).

== Services ==
The station is served by Zurich S-Bahn services S13, to Wädenswil, and S40, to Rapperswil. As of the December 2023 timetable change, the following services call at Einsiedeln:

- Zurich S-Bahn
  - S13: half-hourly service to Wädenswil via Biberbrugg and Samstagern
  - S40: half-hourly service to Rapperswil via Biberbrugg and Pfäffikon SZ

The station is also served by several bus routes of PostAuto, departing from a terminal adjacent to the railway station.

== See also ==
- Rail transport in Switzerland
