= Biberbrugg railway station =

Railway station in Switzerland

Biberbrugg
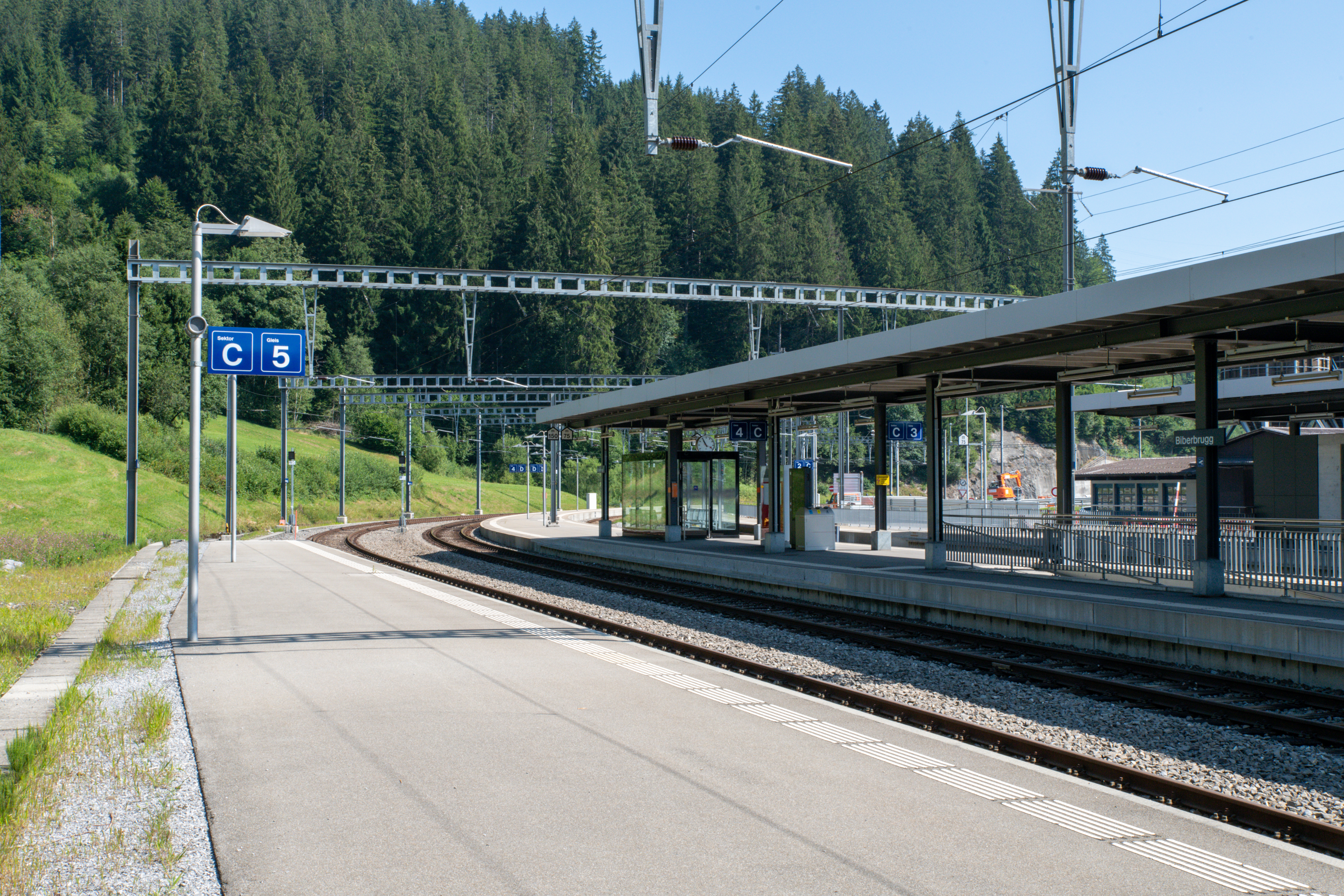
- Renewed station platforms in 2022

General information
- Location: Feusisberg; Switzerland
- Coordinates: 47°09′23″N 8°43′22″E
- Elevation: 830 m (2,720 ft)
- Owner: Südostbahn
- Lines: Pfäffikon–Arth-Goldau; Wädenswil–Einsiedeln
- Platforms: 2 side platforms; 1 island platform
- Tracks: 4
- Train operators: Südostbahn
- Connections
- Bus: PostAuto bus route 551

Other information
- Fare zone: 679 (Tarifverbund Schwyz)

Services
Preceding station	Südostbahn	Following station
Rothenthurm towards Lucerne	Voralpen Express	Pfäffikon SZ towards St. Gallen
Preceding station	Zurich S-Bahn	Following station
Schindellegi-Feusisberg towards Wädenswil	S13	Einsiedeln Terminus
Schindellegi-Feusisberg towards Rapperswil	S40	Einsiedeln Terminus
Preceding station	Lucerne S-Bahn	Following station
Altmatt towards Arth-Goldau	S31	Terminus
Location
- Location within Switzerland Location within Canton of Schwyz

Biberbrugg railway station is a junction station in the municipality of Feusisberg in the Swiss canton of Schwyz. It takes its name from the nearby village of Biberbrugg. The station is on the Pfäffikon–Arth-Goldau and Wädenswil–Einsiedeln railway lines, which are both owned and operated by Südostbahn (SOB). The two lines diverge just south of the station.

== Services ==
The following services stop at Biberbrugg:

- IR Voralpen-Express: hourly service between Lucerne and St. Gallen.
- Zurich S-Bahn:
  - S13: half-hourly service between Einsiedeln and Wädenswil.
  - S40: half-hourly service between Einsiedeln and Rapperswil, via Pfäffikon SZ.
- Lucerne S-Bahn S31: hourly service to Arth-Goldau.

== Gallery ==
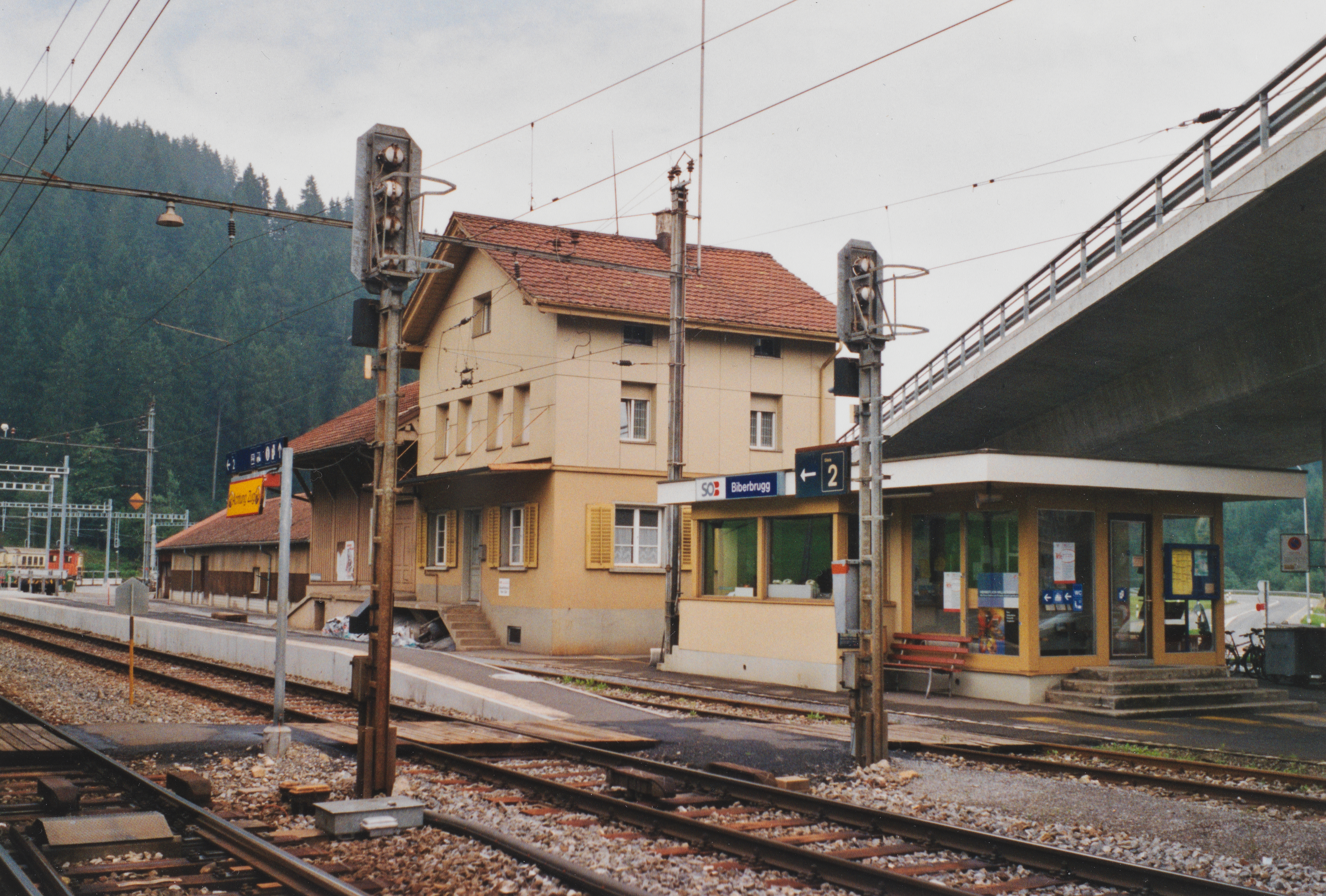
Former station building in 2002

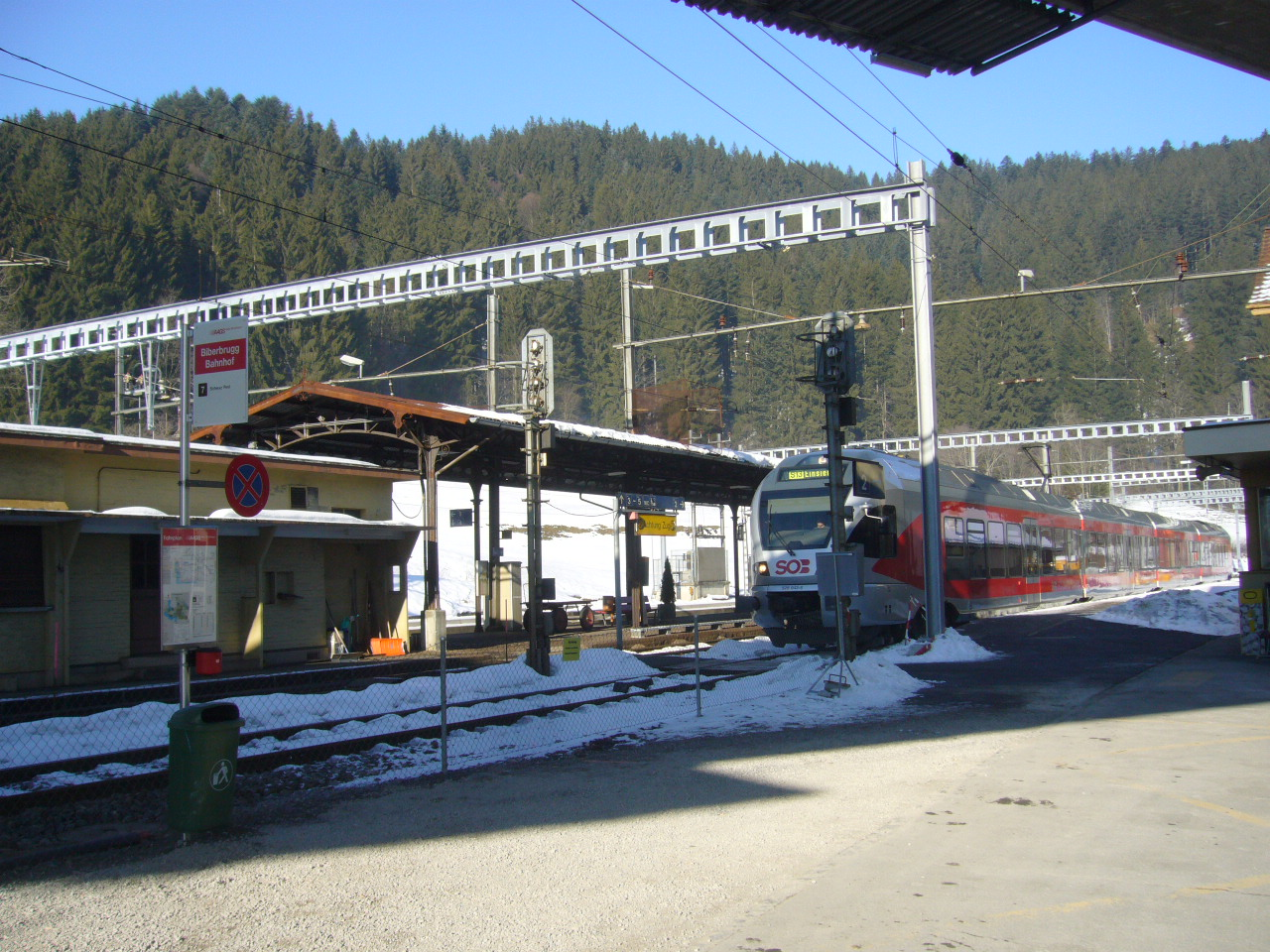
Südostbahn Stadler FLIRT arriving at the station in 2008

== See also ==
- Rail transport in Switzerland
