= Wädenswil railway station =

Railway station in Switzerland

Wädenswil
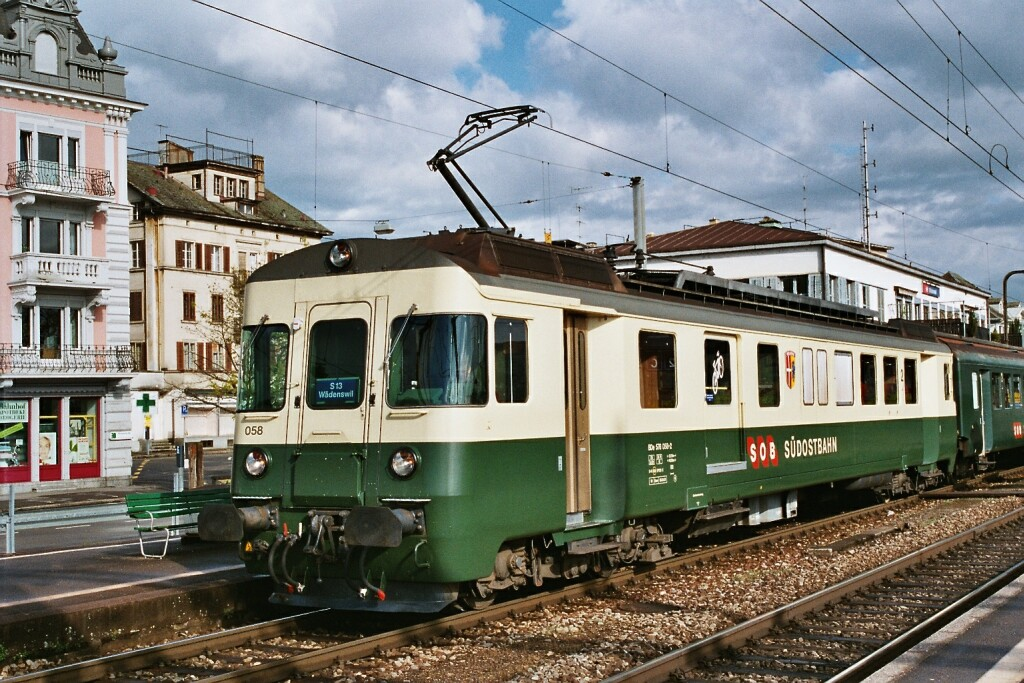
- A Südostbahn train on line S13 at the station in 2003

General information
- Location: Wädenswil; Switzerland
- Coordinates: 47°13′45″N 8°40′31″E
- Elevation: 408 m (1,339 ft)
- Owner: Swiss Federal Railways
- Lines: Lake Zurich left-bank line; Wädenswil–Einsiedeln line
- Platforms: 2 island platforms
- Tracks: 4
- Train operators: Südostbahn; Swiss Federal Railways
- Connections: ZVV
- Ship: ZSG boat lines
- Bus: Zimmerbergbus routes 121 122 123 125 126 127 128 129 150 160
- Airport: Zurich S-Bahn service S2 to/from Zurich Airport in 0:36h

Other information
- Fare zone: 152 (ZVV)

Passengers
- 2025: 18,600 per day (SBB, SOB)
- Rank: 42 out of 1,095 (Note: Tied with Spiez railway station.)

Services
Preceding station	Südostbahn	Following station
Thalwil towards Bern	IR 35 Aare Linth	Pfäffikon SZ towards Chur
Preceding station	Zurich S-Bahn	Following station
Horgen towards Zurich Airport	S2	Richterswil towards Ziegelbrücke
Au ZH towards Winterthur	S8	Richterswil towards Pfäffikon SZ
Terminus	S13	Burghalden towards Einsiedeln
Zürich HB Terminus	S25	Pfäffikon SZ towards Linthal
Au ZH towards Pfäffikon ZH	SN8 Limited service	Richterswil towards Lachen
Location
- Location within Switzerland Location within Canton of Zurich

Wädenswil railway station is a railway station in Switzerland, situated next to the banks of Lake Zurich in the municipality of Wädenswil in the canton of Zurich. It lies within fare zone 152 of the Zürcher Verkehrsverbund (ZVV). The station is located on the Lake Zurich left bank railway line, and is the junction station for the Südostbahn's Wädenswil to Einsiedeln line.

== Layout ==
The railway station has two island platforms and four tracks (Gleis) that are served by passenger trains (a fifth track has no platform). The station is located next to Lake Zurich. A landing stage of the ZSG navigation company is situated to the east of the station. Buses of Zimmerbergbus depart from the bus station located in front of the station building.

== Services ==
=== Rail ===
The station is served on the lakeside line by an hourly long-distance InterRegio (IR) service between Bern and Chur, via Zurich. It is also served by Zurich S-Bahn services S2, S8 and S25 on the lakeside line, and is the terminus of the S13 on the Wädenswil to Einsiedeln line.

As of the December 2024 timetable change, the following services call at Wädenswil:

- InterRegio:
  - Aare-Linth: hourly service between Bern and Chur
- Zurich S-Bahn:
  - S2: half-hourly service between Zürich Airport and Ziegelbrücke
  - S8: half-hourly service between Pfäffikon SZ and Winterthur
  - S13: half-hourly service to Einsiedeln via Biberbrugg
  - S25: hourly service between Zürich Hauptbahnhof and Linthal

Südostbahn (SOB) operates the InterRegio (IR) and S13 services; Swiss Federal Railways operates all other Zurich S-Bahn services.

During weekends (Friday and Saturday nights), there is also a nighttime S-Bahn service (SN8) offered by ZVV.

- Nighttime S-Bahn (only during weekends):
  - SN8: hourly service between Pfäffikon ZH and Lachen (via Zürich HB)

=== Bus ===
Several bus lines of Zimmerbergbus depart from the railway station's forecourt.

=== Boat ===
There is a landing stage adjacent to the railway station, served by ZSG boat lines, in direction to either Zurich Bürkliplatz or Rapperswil/Schmerikon, serving terminals of several lakeside towns and Ufenau island en route.

== See also ==
- ZVV fare zones
- Rail transport in Switzerland
