= Wädenswil–Einsiedeln railway =

Railway line in Switzerland

Overview
- Owner: Südostbahn
- Line number: 672
- Termini: Wädenswil; Einsiedeln

Technical
- Line length: 16.64 km (10.34 mi)
- Num of tracks: mostly 1
- Track gauge: 1,435 mm (4 ft 8 1/2 in) standard gauge
- Electrification: 15 kV/16.7 Hz AC overhead catenary

The Wädenswil–Einsiedeln railway is a largely single-track standard-gauge line in Switzerland. It was built by the Wädenswil-Einsiedeln-Bahn and is now owned by the Schweizerischen Südostbahn (SOB). The line between Wädenswil and Einsiedeln is 16.64 kilometres-long and was opened on 1 May 1877. It has been electrified since 15 May 1939 at 15 kV AC 16.7 Hz.

== History ==
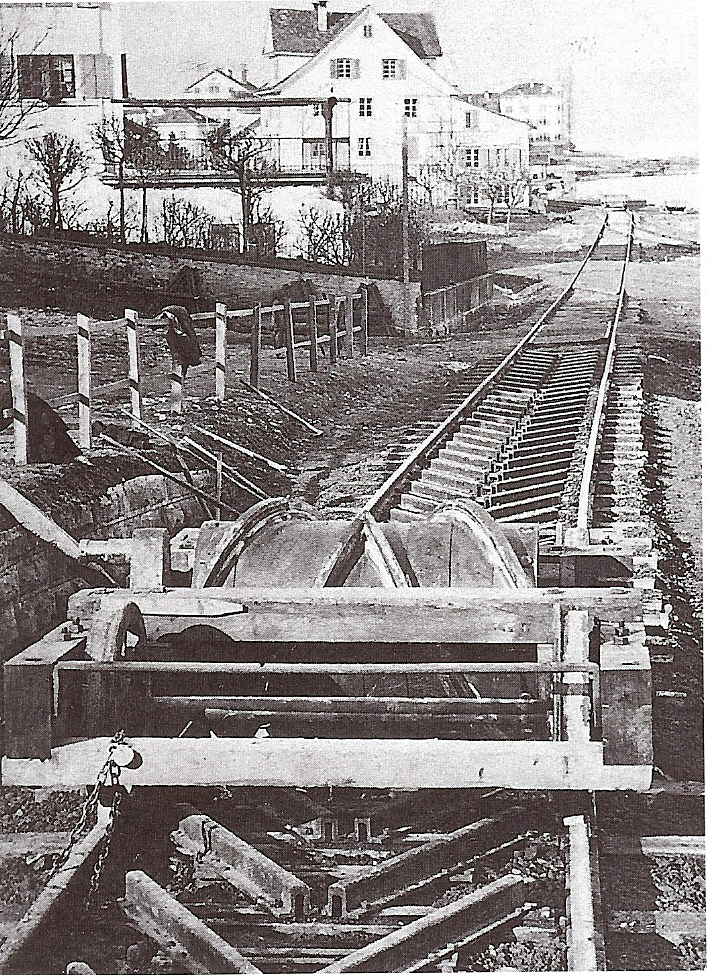
Stretch above Wädenswil, Transporter wagon with roll wheels to check the accuracy of the installation

The line was built with a gradient of 5.0%, since it was initially planned to equip it with the de:Walzenradsystems Wetli (the Wetli Roller Wheel System). After a serious accident during a test drive on 30 November 1876, it was decided not to use the roller wheel system and to operate the track as a pure adhesion railway. The opening of the single-track line took place on 1 May 1877. The Wädenswil–Einsiedeln-Bahn merged with the Zürichsee–Gotthardbahn (Lake Zürich-Gotthard Railway) in 1890, in order to promote the construction of a railway from Rapperswil to Arth-Goldau, where it would connect with the Gotthard Railway. Only the Pfäffikon–Samstagern and the Biberbrugg–Arth-Goldau sections had to be built. The line over the Seedamm had already been completed and the Pfäffikon–Arth-Goldau railway would use the existing line between Samstagern and Biberbrugg. The Pfäffikon–Arth-Goldau railway was opened on 8 August 1891.

Finance for electrification was not secured for a long time, but it was eventually approved at the General Meeting on 6 July 1938. Work began immediately on building the overhead line and the transmission lines. It was scheduled to be completed before the Swiss National Exhibition of 1939 in Zürich (Landi 39). The electricity would be supplied at cost price from the Etzel works of the SBB. The electrification succeeded and the lines were electrified within 10 months. A small celebration took place on 13 May. Electrical operations should have been started on the entire network of the Südostbahn at the timetable change on 15 May 1939. However, the railway did not have its own electric rolling stock at this time. The eight railcars (CFZe 4/4 and BCFZe 4/4) ordered in 1938 had not yet been delivered.

The halt of Grüenfeld was opened in 1979. The Neuberg crossing loop was built between February and May 1981 for the visit of the Pope. It allows two trains to cross between Biberbrugg and Einsiedeln. The line between Samstagern and Schindellegi-Feusisberg was duplicated in 1992 to handle the increase in traffic.

Since 10 June 1979, the Wädenswil–Einsiedeln line has been equipped at least to the former SBB profile I, that is a rail weight of 46 kg/m (92.7 lb/yd). The restrictions on axle load and linear load on bridges could then be lifted. Since 2018, all rolling stock up to and including class D4 (22.5 t or 22.1 long tons or 24.8 short tons axle load, 8 t/m or 7.2 long ton/yd or 8.1 short ton/yd linear load) has been allowed on the line.

== Route ==
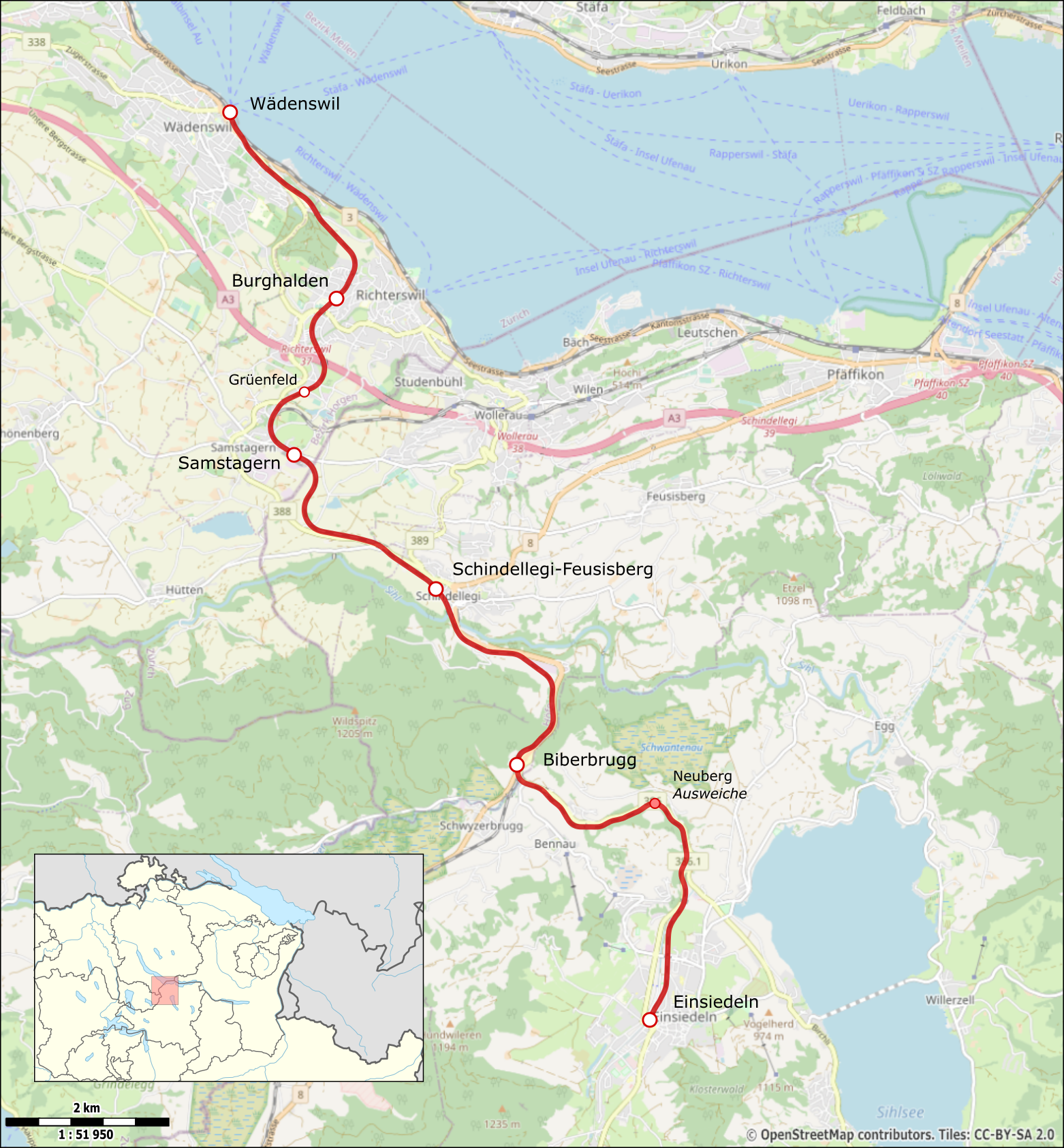
Map of the Wädenswil–Einsiedeln railway

After leaving Wädenswil station, the line crosses the main street at a level crossing. Immediately afterwards, the 5.0% grade begins and the line runs along the slope in a south-easterly direction around the hill on which the ruins of Alt Wädenswil Castle stand. After the bend around the hill, the line reaches the southwest-facing station of Burghalden and is level through the station, but immediately returns to the 5.0% grade. After a left-hand bend crossing a bridge towards the south-east, followed by a right-hand bend, the line reaches the halt of Grüenfeld running to the southwest. Part of the station lies on a grade of 3.0%, but within the platform area the line returns to a 5.0% grade. The line takes a slight left turn that tightens and turns another 80 degrees to run parallel with the line from Pfäffikon, which makes a 180-degree turn here.

The line crosses a level crossing where it straightens on the approach to Samstagern station, which is orientated to the south-southwest. Next to the line on the right is the Samstagern workshop and the station building with a goods shed and a loading ramp is to the left. The 5.0% grade begins again before then end of the platform and immediately goes into a 90-degree right turn and then into another 90 left turn. The line then runs along the main road along the slope through the locality of Itlimoosweiher. The road crosses the railway line on a bridge in Asch, where, the line makes a slight bend to the right to reach Schindellegi-Feusisberg station, which also has a station straight. The station is on a slight right-hand turn towards the southwest. After the station there is a short 4.5% grade and the line crosses the Sihl on a bridge. There is a siding in Chaltenboden.

The line now turns south into the Alp gorge and is noticeably flatter. Shortly later the line curves into Biberbrugg station. The junction station has a section of straight track, but is mostly located on a curve. The tracks are orientated north–south in front of the station building, which is located east of the tracks. The road to Sattel crosses the station on a bridge. After this bridge, the line to Einsiedeln crosses the Biber on a left turn, while the line to Arth-Goldau remains on the other side of the river for a short distance. The line to Einsiedeln runs along the winding Alp, but only on the left bank. After a good two kilometres, the line reaches the Neuberg crossing loop, which lies to the east-northeast. The line turns in Nübergsübergang through several curves back to the south. Until 1936, the Rabennest tunnel was located at the last turn before the line runs continuously to the south. The line crosses the Alp at Holzrütisäge, where the Alp valley widens. Shortly afterwards, the line reaches the storage sidings and Einsiedeln station a kilometre later.

== Structures ==
The only tunnel of the line, the 54 metre-long Rabennest tunnel between Biberbrugg and Einsiedeln, had to be removed in 1936 due to strong earth forces. It was opened out and replaced by a retaining wall.

== Accidents ==
=== 30 November 1876 (Wädenswil): out of control test train ===
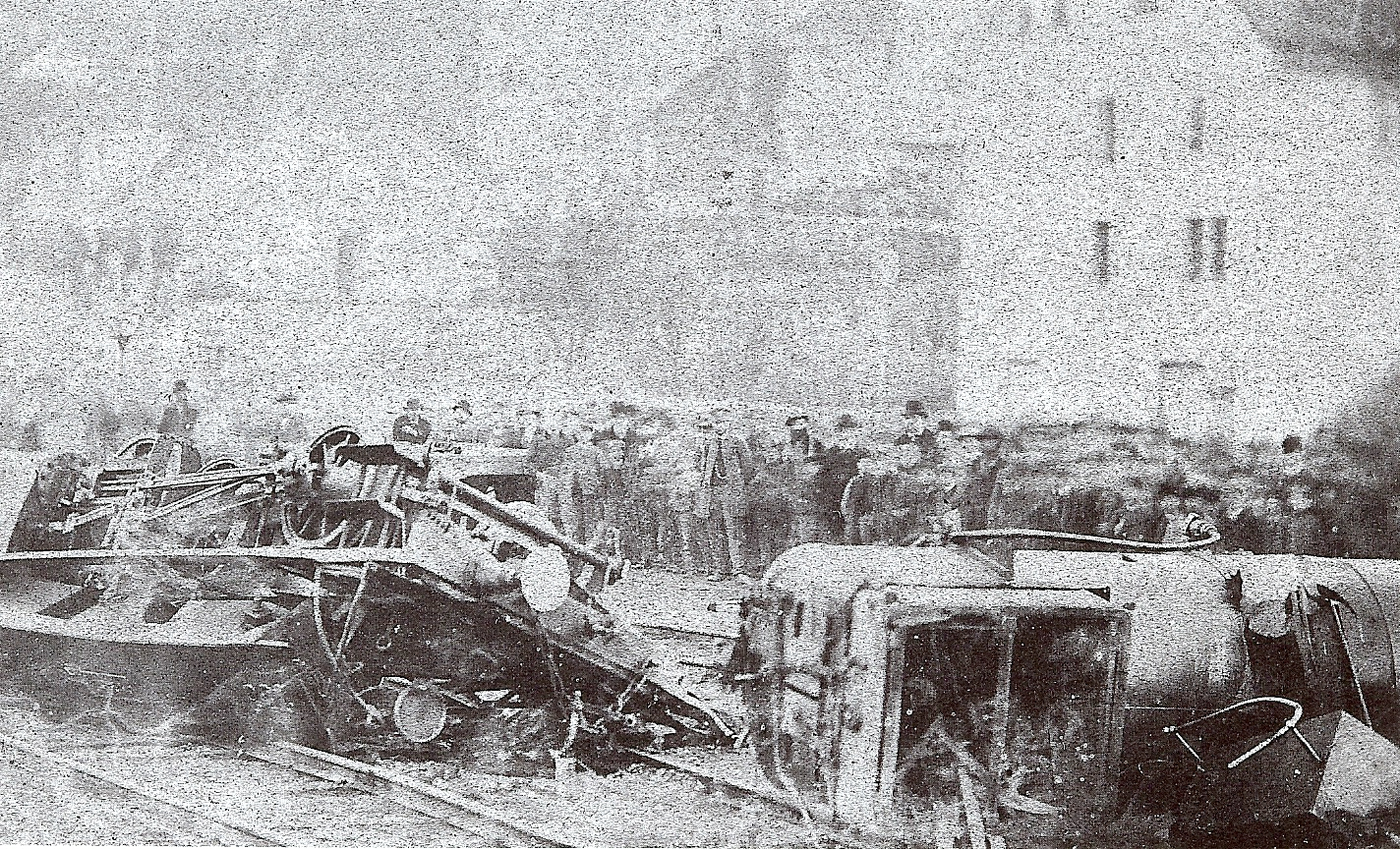
Newspaper photo of the accident on 30 November 1876 in Wädenswil

The trial of the Wetli system was held on 30 November 1876. The ascent with locomotive 253 was promising. After the train arrived in Schindellegi, the helical wheel which engaged on the track sections disengaged due to irregularities. The brakes failed during the descent to Wädenswil without intervention by the rollers. It is believed that oil leaked and fell on the rails and the wheels, rendering the brakes ineffective. (This theory is set out by Alfred Moser, in his book among others). The disaster was foreseeable, so that some of the people on board tried to escape by jumping off. All persons were injured, one member of the company's board was thrown out and killed. At the entrance to Wädenswil station, the train had a speed of an estimated 120 kilometers per hour. This caused the locomotive to overturn in the station and another person was killed. The casualties are not completely proven. Depending on the source, one dead and five injured or two dead and several injured are given. This could indicate that an injured person died later and thus was not counted as killed in the newspaper reports.

After this incident, no one was willing to test the Wetli system any further, so that there was no chance to restore it to operation. The Swiss Northeastern Railway (Nordostbahn) withdrew from its construction obligations as a result of the accident, as it seriously doubted the appropriateness of the Wetli system and, as a consequence, did not want to carry out any further tests.

=== 26 July 1947 at the Bennau footbridge: head-on collision ===
On 26 July 1947, there was a head-on collision of two trains at the Bennau footbridge between Biberbrugg and Einsiedeln. Train 183 had been sent by the station master down the line two minutes early, although it was still occupied by train 84. 10 people died and at least 63 others were injured.

=== 22 February 1948 (Wädenswil): out of control sports special train ===
On 22 February 1948, a sports special train from Sattel to Zurich overran a buffer stop in Wädenswil station at 60 km/h after an error by the locomotive driver, who left the regenerative brake in the "power" position rather than the "braking" setting, and ran into the operating and administrative building of a fruit and wine cooperative. This killed 22 people.

=== 2 September 1952 between Samstagern and Schindellegi: head-on collision ===
On 2 September 1952, two passenger trains collided on the open track between Samstagern and Schindellegi because the delayed train 34 did not wait for a delayed crossing in Schindellegi. This time there were no dead, but only six injured—five passengers and the train and post office attendant—to complain.
