= Wädenswil =

- Municipality
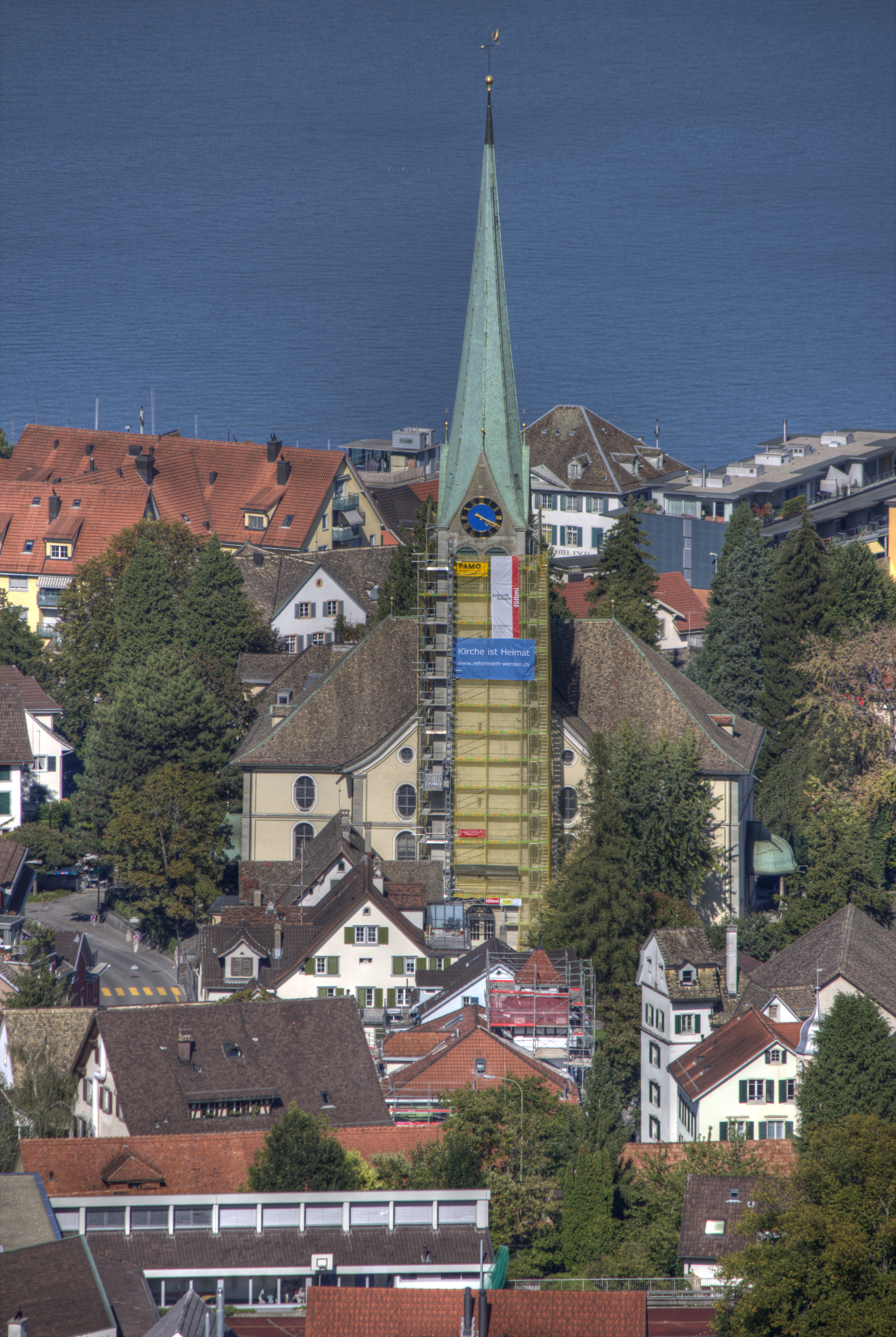

- Flag Coat of arms
- Location of Wädenswil
- Location within Switzerland Location within Canton of Zürich
- Coordinates: 47°14′N 8°40′E
- Country: Switzerland
- Canton: Zürich
- District: Horgen

Government
  - Executive: Stadtrat with 7 members
  - Mayor: Stadtpräsident (list); Philipp Kutter (as of October 2014)
  - Parliament: Gemeinderat with 35 members

Area
  - Total: 17.37 km^{2} (6.71 sq mi)
- Elevation: 407 m (1,335 ft)

Population (December 2020)
  - Total: 24,832
  - Density: 1,430/km^{2} (3,703/sq mi)
- Time zone: UTC+01:00 (CET)
  - Summer (DST): UTC+02:00 (CEST)
- Postal code: 8820
- SFOS number: 293
- ISO 3166 code: CH-ZH
- Surrounded by: Au, Zürich, Hirzel, Horgen, Männedorf, Meilen, Richterswil, Schönenberg, Stäfa, Uetikon am See
- Website: www.waedenswil.ch

Wädenswil (locally often called Wättischwiil, Wädischwiil or Wädi) is a municipality located in the district of Horgen in the canton of Zürich in Switzerland. The population, as of 2013, was about 21,000. On 1 January 2019 the former municipalities of Hütten and Schönenberg were merged into the municipality of Wädenswil. Located on the Zürichsee lakeshore, it includes Wädenswil–Vorder Au, part of the UNESCO World Heritage Site Prehistoric pile dwellings around the Alps.

== Geography ==
Aerial view from 200 m by Walter Mittelholzer (1919)

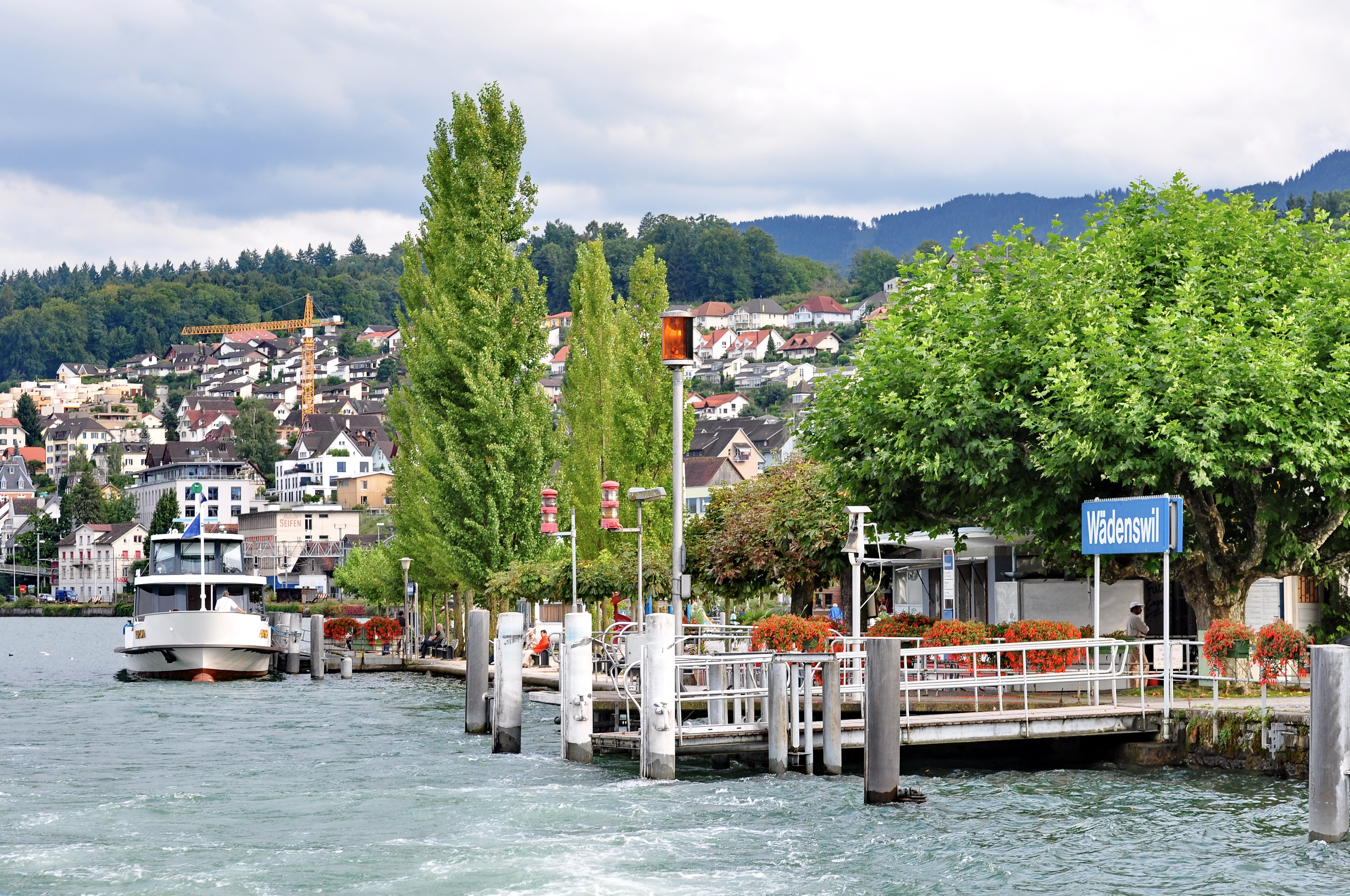
Wädenswil as seen from Lake Zürich (June 2009)

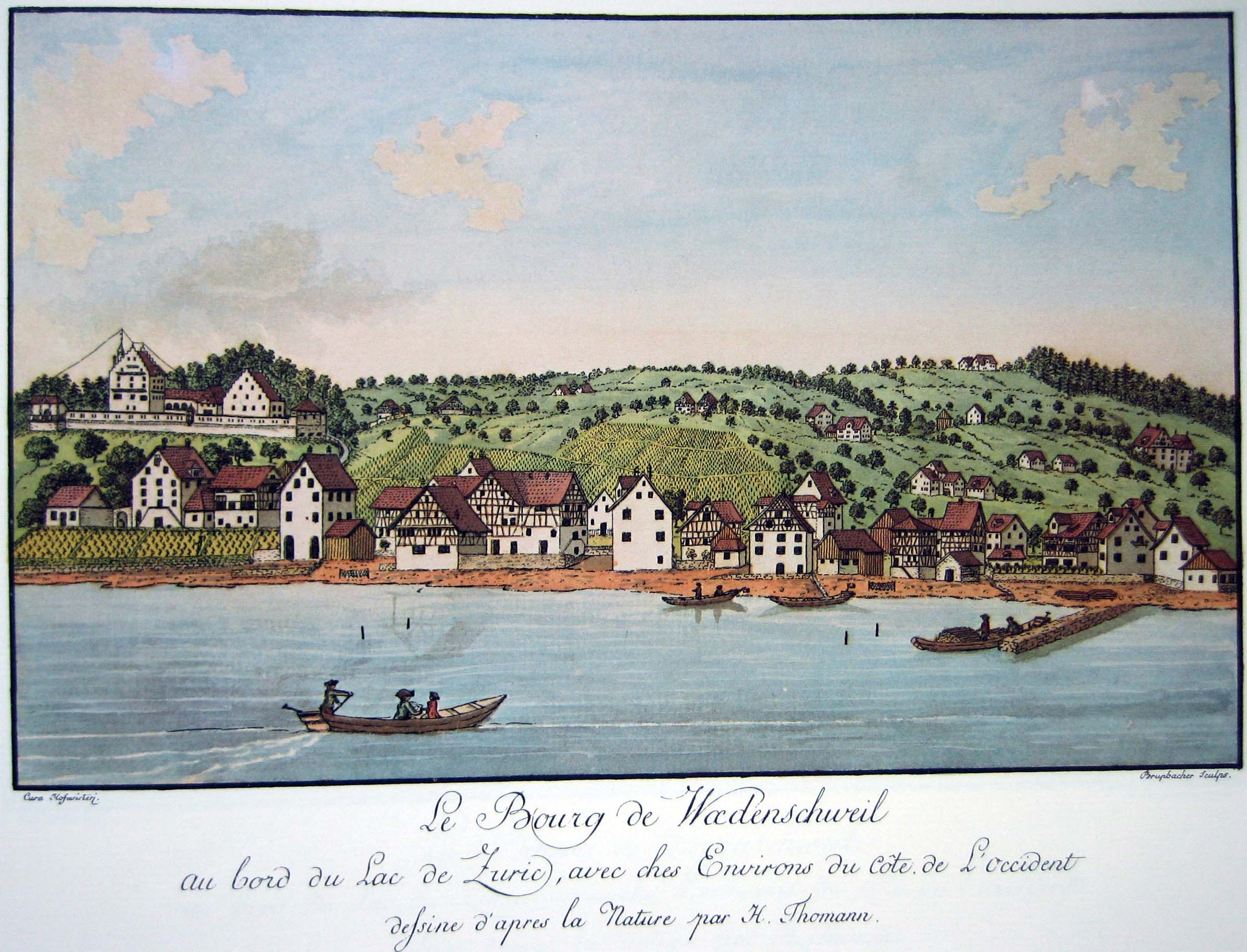
Wädenswil and Lake Zürich (1794)

Before the 2019 merger, Wädenswil had an area of 17.4 km^{2} (6.7 sq mi). Of this area, 59.3% is used for agricultural purposes, 9.6% is forested, 29.8% is settled (buildings or roads), and the remainder (1.3%) is non-productive (rivers, glaciers or mountains). In 1996 housing and buildings made up 20.8% of the total area, while transportation infrastructure made up the rest (9%). Of the total unproductive area, water (streams and lakes) made up 0.4% of the area. As of 2007 24.5% of the total municipal area was undergoing some type of construction.

== Demographics ==
Wädenswil has a population (as of 31 December 2020) of 24,832. As of 2007, 20.5% of the population was made up of foreign nationals. As of 2008 the gender distribution of the population was 48.6% male and 51.4% female. Over the last 10 years the population has grown at a rate of 2.1%. Most of the population (as of 2000) speaks German (85.0%), with Italian being second most common ( 3.9%) and Serbo-Croatian being third ( 1.9%).

In the 2007 election the most popular party was the SVP which received 35.2% of the vote. The next three most popular parties were the SPS (17.6%), the FDP (13%) and the CSP (11.3%).

The age distribution of the population (as of 2000) is 22% children and teenagers (0–19 years old), while adults (20–64 years old) make up 64.2% and seniors (over 64 years old) make up 13.9%. In Wädenswil about 76.7% of the population (between age 25–64) have completed either non-mandatory upper secondary education or additional higher education (either university or a Fachhochschule). There are 8796 households in Wädenswil.

Wädenswil has an unemployment rate of 2.94%. As of 2005, there were 268 people employed in the primary economic sector and about 84 businesses involved in this sector. 2020 people are employed in the secondary sector and there are 195 businesses in this sector. 5169 people are employed in the tertiary sector, with 725 businesses in this sector. As of 2007 44.8% of the working population were employed full-time, and 55.2% were employed part-time.

As of 2008 there were 6128 Catholics and 7507 Protestants in Wädenswil. In the 2000 census, religion was broken down into several smaller categories. From the census, 43.5% were some type of Protestant, with 40.5% belonging to the Swiss Reformed Church and 3% belonging to other Protestant churches. 32.2% of the population were Catholic. Of the rest of the population, 5% were Muslim, 7.5% belonged to another religion (not listed), 4% did not give a religion, and 11.9% were atheist or agnostic.

== Cultural heritage ==
Located on Zürichsee lakeshore, Wädenswil–Vorder Au is part of the 56 Swiss sites that make up the UNESCO World Heritage Site Prehistoric pile dwellings around the Alps, and the settlement is also listed in the Swiss inventory of cultural property of national and regional significance as a Class A object.

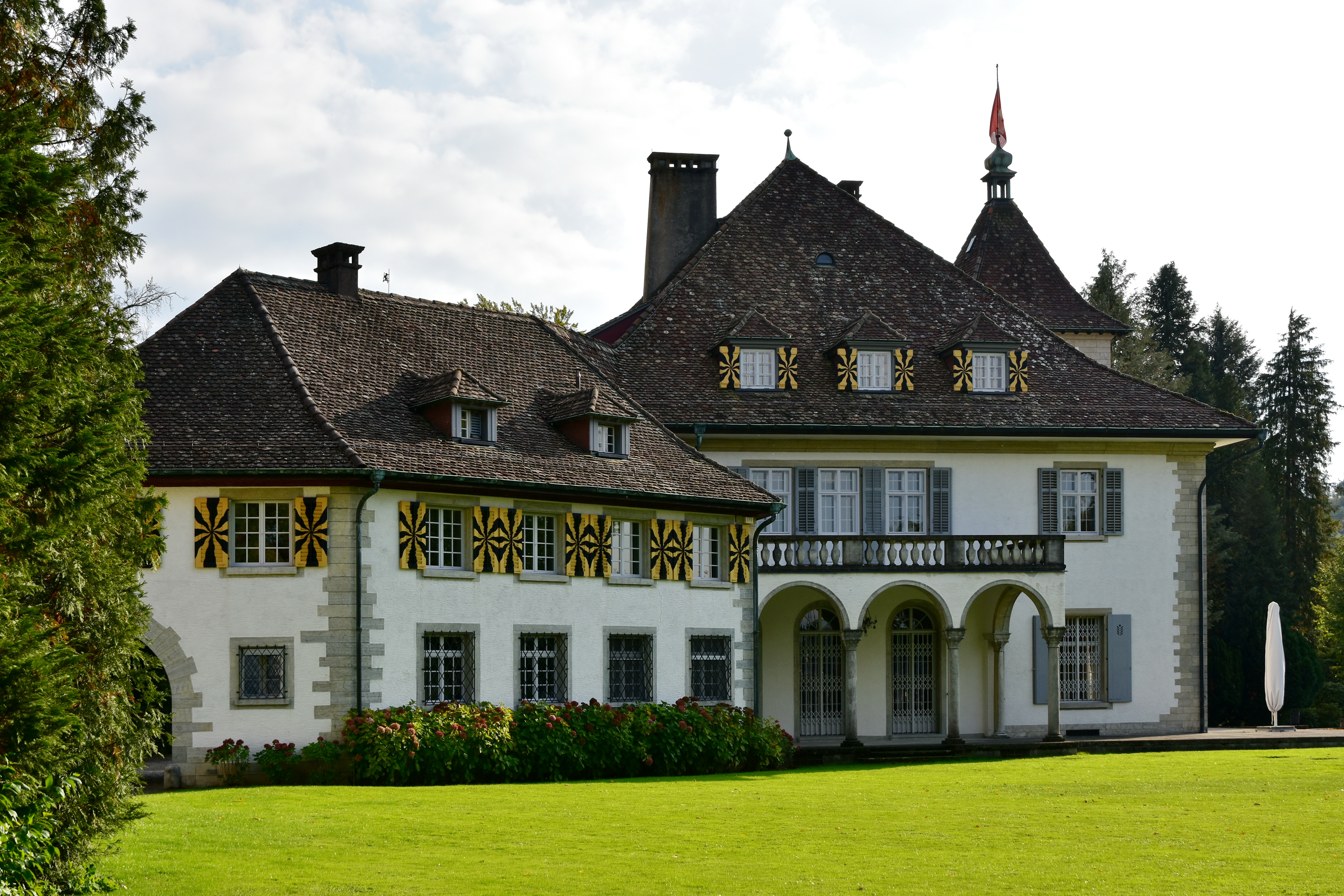
Schloss Au on the Au peninsula

The Schloss Au on the Au Peninsula, its auxiliary buildings and the park are listed in the Swiss inventory of cultural property of national and regional significance as a Class B object of regional importance.

The Wädenswil brewery in the Swiss canton of Zurich was a brewery from 1833 until 1990. The building of the former brewery was partially demolished in 2003. However, the tradition of Wädenswiler beer brewing continues since 1992 with the "Wadi-Brau-Huus AG».

Since the early 1500s, Wädenswil and nearby Richterswil have been home to groups of Anabaptists, many of whom emigrated to Pennsylvania in the 1700s. Many of the last names common to the area are still found plentifully in the southeastern area of that state.

== Transportation ==
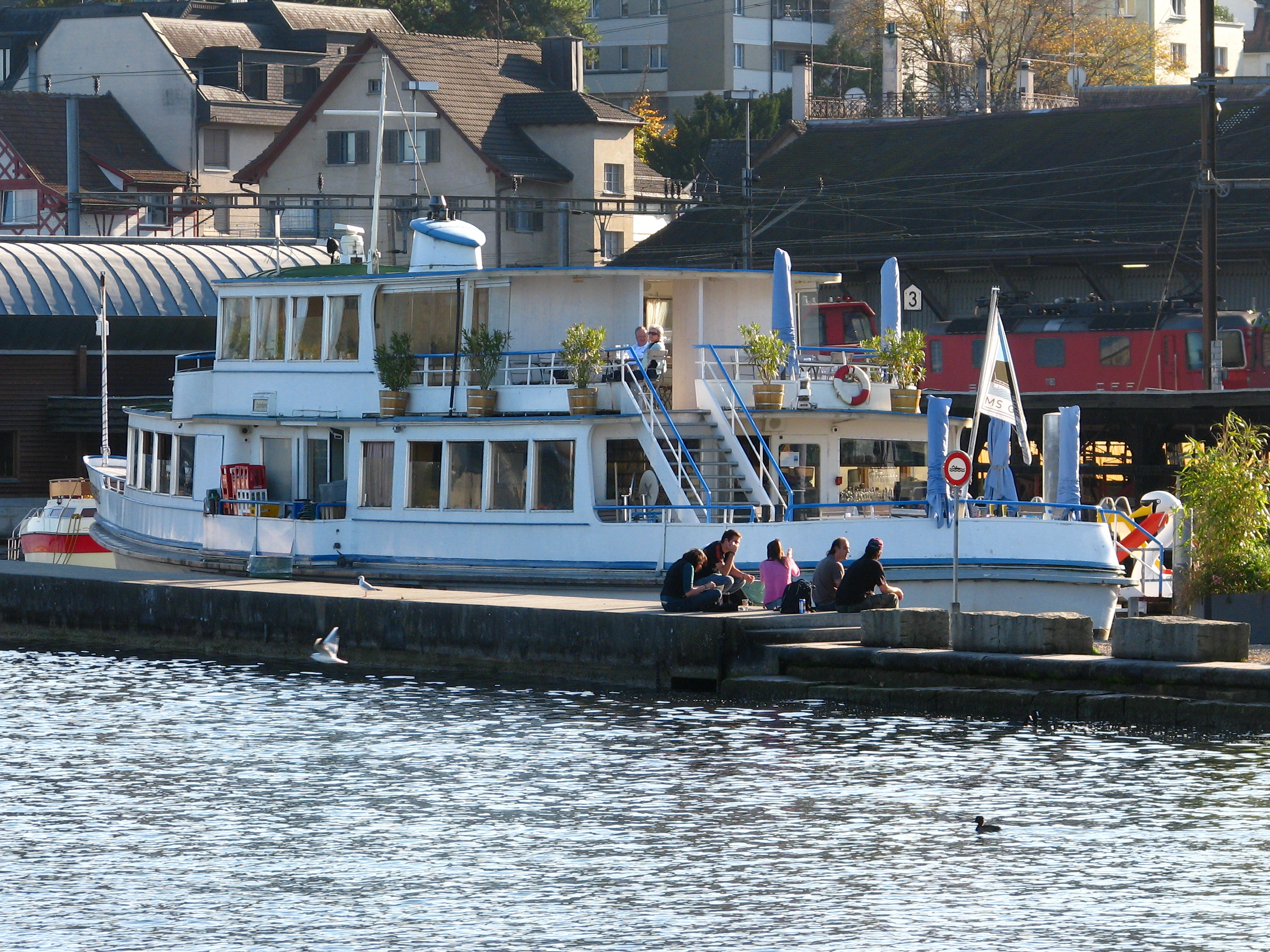
Motor ship Glärnisch serving as Restaurant at Wädenswil harbour

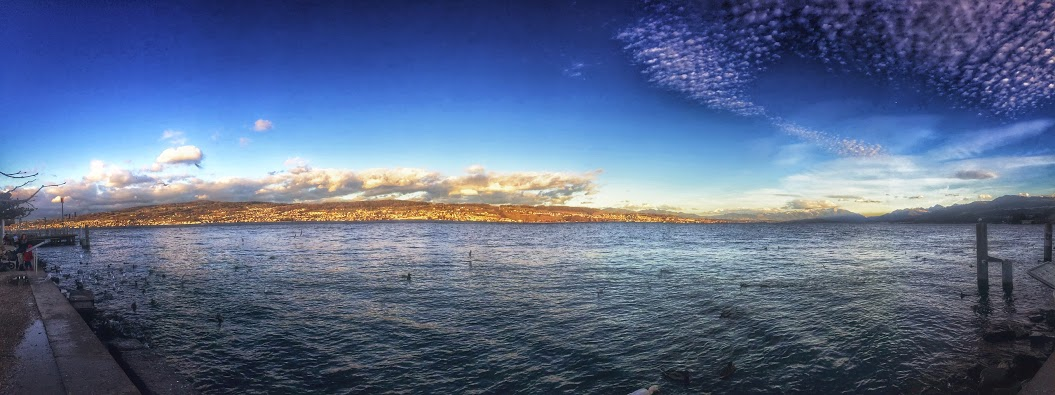
Lake of Zürich as seen from the pier at Wädenswil

The municipality is located on the A3 motorway.

Wädenswil railway station is served by Zürich S-Bahn services S2, S25 and S8 on the lakeside line to Zürich, and is the terminus of the S13 service to Einsiedeln. It is also served by an hourly long-distance service, generally an InterRegio service between Basel and Chur, but sometimes a EuroCity between Hamburg or Brussels and Chur. It is a 29-minute ride from Zürich Hauptbahnhof by the S8.

The Zimmerberg bus line (Zimmerbergbus), provided by the Sihltal Zürich Uetliberg Bahn (SZU), connects the Zimmerberg region and parts of the Sihl valley.

In summer, Wädenswil is served by regular ship services between Zürich and Rapperswil, run by the Zürichsee-Schifffahrtsgesellschaft (ZSG) and calling at various lake side towns. A passenger ferry, operated on an hourly basis throughout the year by the same company, links Wädenswil with both Männedorf and Stäfa on the opposite shore of the lake. The ZSG's motor ship Wädenswil is named after the town.

== Education ==
=== Public schools ===
The public Primarschule is supervised by the commune's Schulpflege. The board consists of nine elected members.

== Education ==
The Kindergarten are:

- Kindergarten Seeguet
- Kindergarten Toblerweg 1 and 2
- Kindergarten Zopf 1 and 2

The Primarschulen are:

- Au
- Eidmatt
- Gerberacher-Berg
- Glärnisch
- KLEINgruppenschule
- Untermosen

The Oberstufenschule Wädenswil (OSW) is:

- Rotweg
- Fuhrstrasse
- Untermosen
- Steinacher

The OSW is supervised by the commune's Schulpflege. The board consists of nine elected members.

- Musikschule Wädenswil-Richterswil

=== Secondary education (Gymnasium) ===
From the 2020/21 school year, the Kantonsschule Zimmerberg (KZI) began operating in a provisional facility in Wädenswil. It offers both long- and short-track gymnasium programmes with five Matura profiles and serves students from the Zimmerberg region on the left shore of Lake Zurich. A permanent campus for around 1,000–1,200 students is planned on the AuPark site in Wädenswil.

=== Vocational schools ===
- Hotel & Gastro formation Zürich - Ausbildungszentrum WäBi
- Strickhof/Berufsbildungszentrum (BZW)
- Regionales Ausbildungszentrum (RAU)
- Stiftung Bühl - Zentrum für Heilpädagogik und berufliche Eingliederung

=== Universities ===
- ZHAW Wädenswil - Kompetenzzentrum für Life Sciences und Facility Management

=== Other private schools ===
The Zürich International School, an international school with an American curriculum, has its Lower School and Early ZIS campus (for early childhood and primary school) in Wädenswil. ZIS' Kindergarten and primary school is approved by the bureau for elementary school (Volksschulamt) of the canton of Zürich. However, it does not approve ZIS for its lower and upper secondary education (Sekundarstufe I aka Sekundarschule, and Sekundarstufe II aka Mittelschule). Therefore, its upper secondary school is not approved by the Swiss Federation, neither.

== Weather ==
Between 1991 and 2020 Wädenswil had an average of 136.0 days of rain per year and on average received 1,362 mm (53.6 in) of precipitation. The wettest month was August during which time Wädenswil received an average of 163 mm (6.4 in) of precipitation. During the wettest month, there was precipitation for an average of 12.3 days. The month with the most precipitation days was June, with an average of 13.3 days.

Climate data for Wädenswil, elevation 485 m (1,591 ft), (1991–2020)
Month	Jan	Feb	Mar	Apr	May	Jun	Jul	Aug	Sep	Oct	Nov	Dec	Year
Mean daily maximum °C (°F)	3.5 (38.3)	5.2 (41.4)	10.2 (50.4)	14.8 (58.6)	19.0 (66.2)	22.6 (72.7)	24.5 (76.1)	23.9 (75.0)	19.1 (66.4)	13.9 (57.0)	7.9 (46.2)	4.2 (39.6)	14.1 (57.4)
Daily mean °C (°F)	1.0 (33.8)	1.8 (35.2)	5.8 (42.4)	9.8 (49.6)	13.9 (57.0)	17.5 (63.5)	19.3 (66.7)	18.9 (66.0)	14.7 (58.5)	10.3 (50.5)	5.2 (41.4)	1.9 (35.4)	10.0 (50.0)
Mean daily minimum °C (°F)	−1.4 (29.5)	−1.2 (29.8)	1.9 (35.4)	5.2 (41.4)	9.3 (48.7)	12.9 (55.2)	14.7 (58.5)	14.5 (58.1)	10.9 (51.6)	7.3 (45.1)	2.7 (36.9)	−0.4 (31.3)	6.4 (43.5)
Average precipitation mm (inches)	79.7 (3.14)	77.5 (3.05)	88.7 (3.49)	93.7 (3.69)	139.5 (5.49)	149.2 (5.87)	155.4 (6.12)	163.3 (6.43)	115.5 (4.55)	99.4 (3.91)	95.0 (3.74)	105.0 (4.13)	1,361.9 (53.62)
Average precipitation days (≥ 1.0 mm)	10.4	9.7	11.3	10.6	13.0	13.3	12.9	12.3	10.5	10.2	10.1	11.7	136.0
Average relative humidity (%)	81	76	71	67	70	70	70	74	79	83	84	83	76
Mean monthly sunshine hours	55.7	87.0	143.7	182.7	197.7	215.7	234.2	217.6	160.9	106.9	56.7	44.5	1,703.3
Percentage possible sunshine	24	34	42	47	44	47	51	52	46	35	24	20	42
Source 1: NOAA
Source 2: MeteoSwiss

== Notable people ==
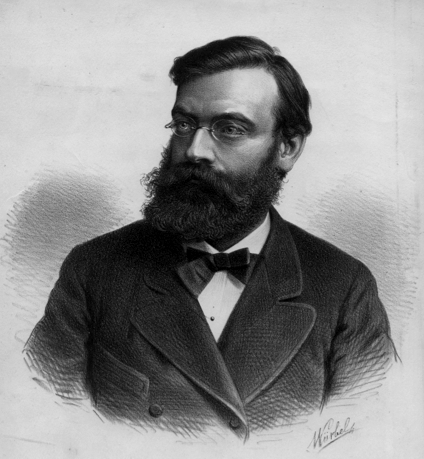
Hans Auer, 1885

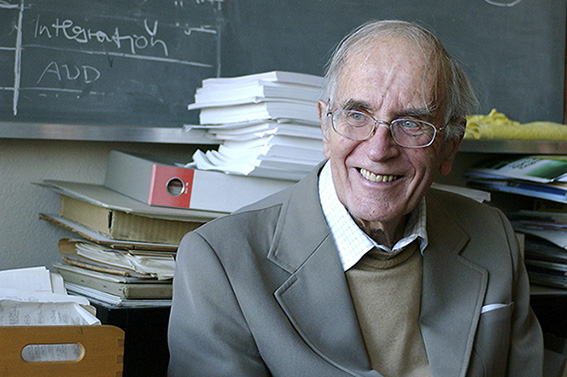
Paul Wild, 2006

- Johann Gottfried Steffan (1815–1905) Swiss landscape artist
- Walter Hauser (1837–1902) politician, member of the Swiss Federal Council 1888–1902
- Hans Auer (1847–1906) a Swiss-Austrian architect, designed the Federal Palace of Switzerland 1894–1902
- Robert Haab (1865–1939) politician, on the Swiss Federal Council 1917–1929
- Otto Hauser (1874–1932) a prehistorian
- Hermann Müller (Thurgau) Swiss oenologist 1850–1927
- Paul Wild (1925–2014) astronomer, discovered numerous comets, asteroids and supernovae
- Ernst Hürlimann (born 1934) rower, bronze medallist in the 1960 Summer Olympics
- Karin Ott (born 1945) operatic coloratura soprano
- Daniel Wyder (born 1962) former racing cyclist.
- Alain Nef (born 1982) football defender, over 460 club caps
- José Manuel Rodríguez Morgade (born 1984) known as Manu, a Spanish professional footballer
