= Freienbach =

- Municipality
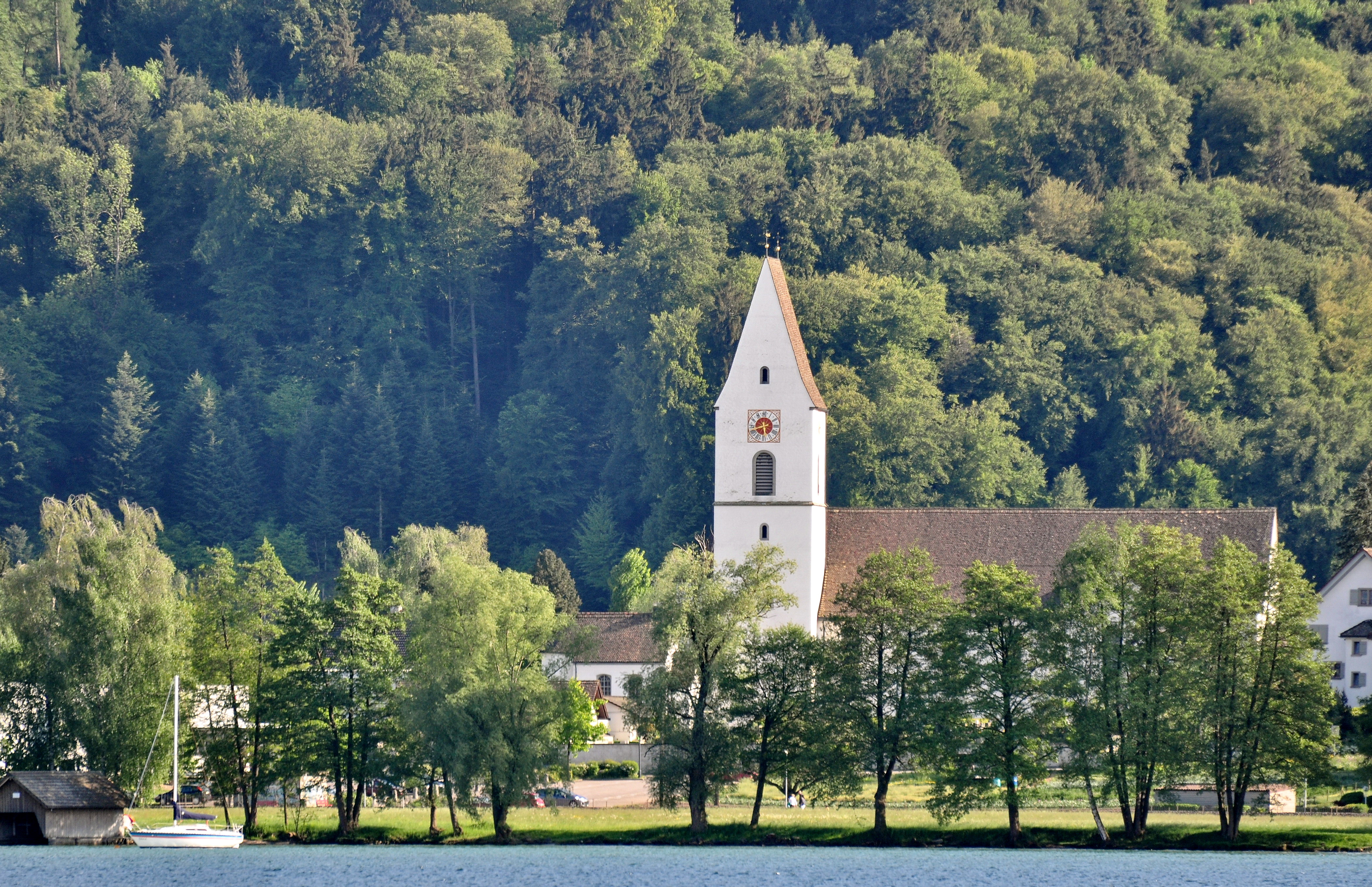

- Flag Coat of arms
- Location of Freienbach
- Location within Switzerland Location within Canton of Schwyz
- Coordinates: 47°12′N 8°45′E
- Country: Switzerland
- Canton: Schwyz
- District: Höfe

Government
  - Executive: Gemeinderat with 9 members

Area
  - Total: 20.30 km^{2} (7.84 sq mi)
- Elevation: 418 m (1,371 ft)

Population (December 2020)
  - Total: 16,520
  - Density: 813.8/km^{2} (2,108/sq mi)
- Time zone: UTC+01:00 (CET)
  - Summer (DST): UTC+02:00 (CEST)
- Postal code: 8807
- SFOS number: 1322
- ISO 3166 code: CH-SZ
- Localities: Bäch, Freienbach, Hurden, Pfäffikon, Wilen
- Surrounded by: Altendorf, Einsiedeln, Feusisberg, Hombrechtikon (ZH), Jona (SG), Rapperswil (SG), Richterswil (ZH), Stäfa (ZH), Wollerau
- Website: www.freienbach.ch

Freienbach (Swiss Standard German pronunciation: [ˈfraɪənˌbax]) is a municipality in Höfe District in the canton of Schwyz in Switzerland.

== History ==
Freienbach is first mentioned in 972 as Friginbach.

== Geography ==
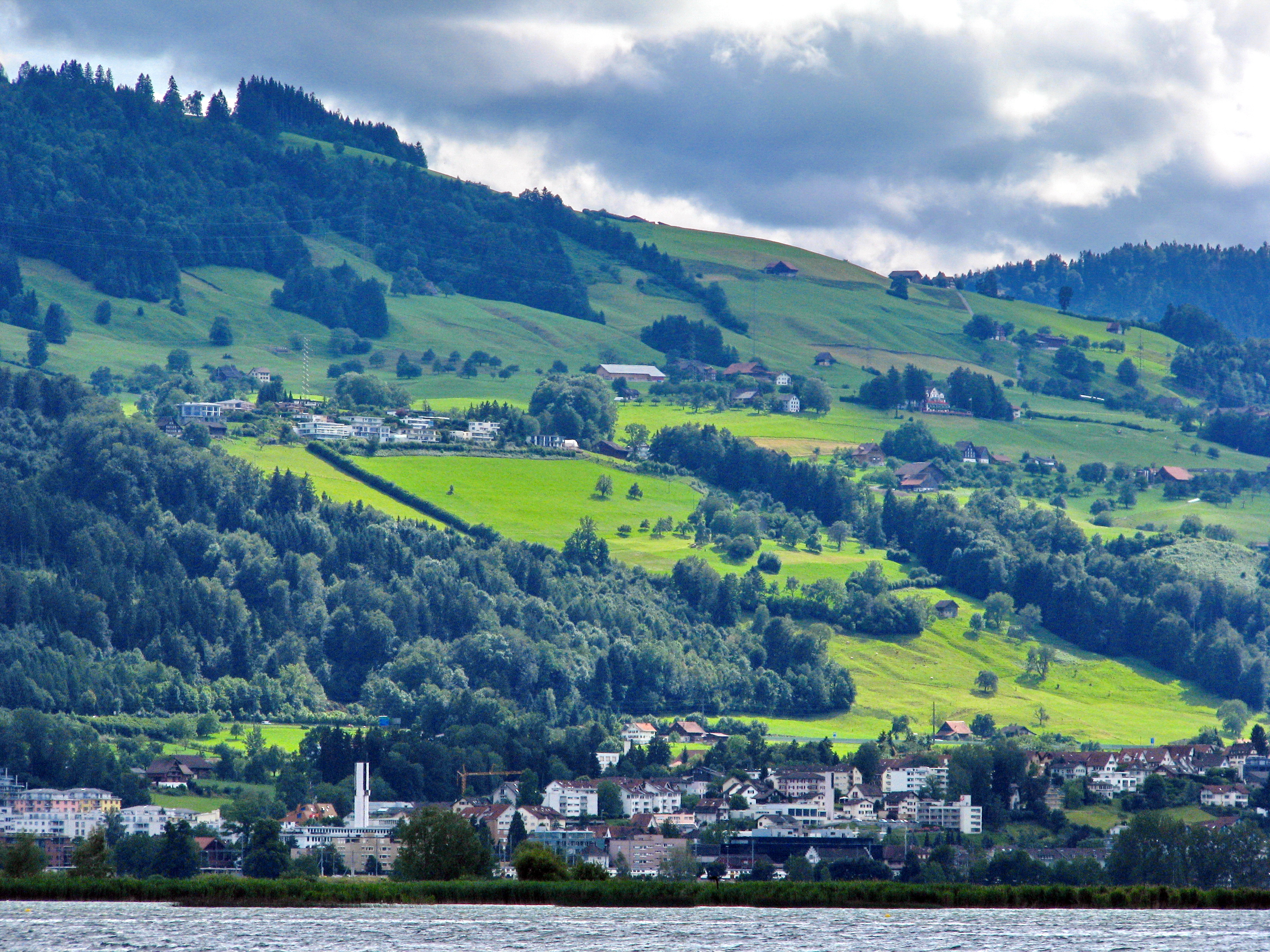
Freienbach and Etzel (mountain) in the background

Freienbach has an area, as of 2006, of 13.8 km^{2} (5.3 sq mi). Of this area, 40.7% is used for agricultural purposes, while 23.8% is forested. Of the rest of the land, 31% is settled (buildings or roads) and the remainder (4.5%) is non-productive (rivers, glaciers or mountains).

The municipality is located on Lake Zurich, including its upper section known as Obersee, and stretches from the lake (elevation 406 m (1,332 ft)) to the Etzel mountain (elevation 1,098 m (3,602 ft)). It consists of the villages of Freienbach, Pfäffikon (not to be confused with Pfäffikon in the canton of Zurich), Wilen, Bäch, Hurden (located on the Hurden Peninsula) and the two islands of Lützelau and Ufenau (Ufnau).

== Demographics ==
Freienbach has a population (as of 31 December 2020) of 16,520. As of 2007, 23.2% of the population was made up of foreign nationals. Over the last 10 years the population has grown at a rate of 23.8%. Most of the population (as of 2000) speaks German (87.9%), with Italian being second most common (2.3%) and Serbo-Croatian being third (2.0%).

As of 2000 the gender distribution of the population was 50.6% male and 49.4% female. The age distribution, as of 2008, in Freienbach is; 2,963 people or 22.7% of the population is between 0 and 19. 4,174 people or 32.0% are 20 to 39, and 4,432 people or 33.9% are 40 to 64. The senior population distribution is 977 people or 7.5% are 65 to 74. There are 407 people or 3.1% who are 70 to 79 and 102 people or 0.78% of the population who are over 80.

As of 2000 there are 5,558 households, of which 1,653 households (or about 29.7%) contain only a single individual. 274 or about 4.9% are large households, with at least five members.

In the 2007 election the most popular party was the SVP which received 44.1% of the vote. The next three most popular parties were the FDP (19%), the SPS (16.3%) and the CVP (15%).

In Freienbach about 74.7% of the population (between age 25-64) have completed either non-mandatory upper secondary education or additional higher education (either university or a Fachhochschule).

Freienbach has an unemployment rate of 1.7%. As of 2005, there were 184 people employed in the primary economic sector and about 53 businesses involved in this sector. 2,718 people are employed in the secondary sector and there are 216 businesses in this sector. 7,174 people are employed in the tertiary sector, with 1,029 businesses in this sector.

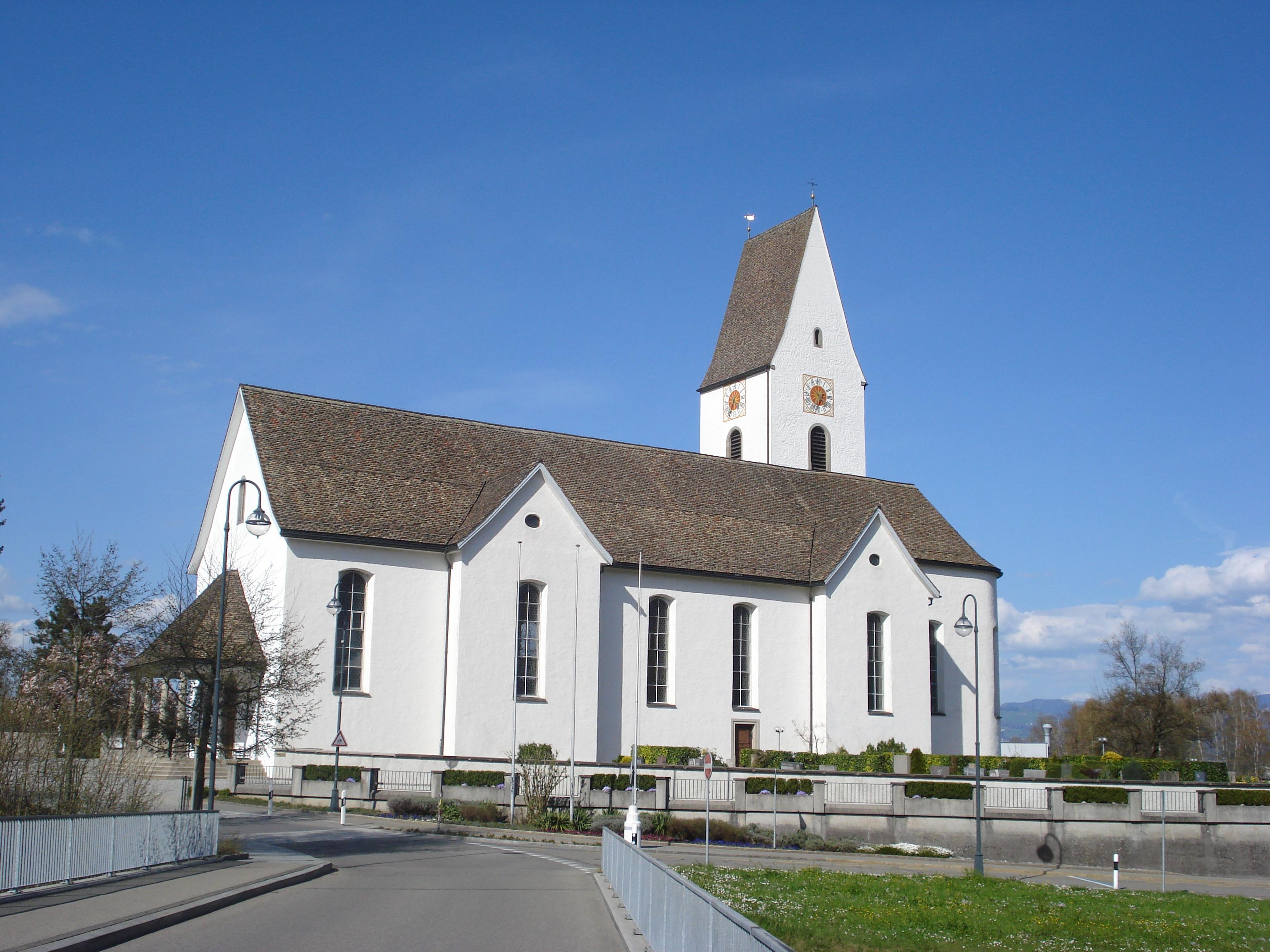
Roman Catholic church in Freienbach

From the 2000 census, 7,641 or 58.5% are Roman Catholic, while 2,915 or 22.3% belonged to the Swiss Reformed Church. Of the rest of the population, there are 6 individuals (or about 0.05% of the population) who belong to the Christian Catholic faith, there are 202 individuals (or about 1.55% of the population) who belong to the Orthodox Church, and there are 18 individuals (or about 0.14% of the population) who belong to another Christian church. There are 12 individuals (or about 0.09% of the population) who are Jewish, and 633 (or about 4.85% of the population) who are Islamic. There are 92 individuals (or about 0.70% of the population) who belong to another church (not listed on the census), 1,151 (or about 8.82% of the population) belong to no church, are agnostic or atheist, and 385 individuals (or about 2.95% of the population) did not answer the question.

The historical population is given in the following table:

year	population
1743	1,198
1850	2,058
1900	2,270
1950	3,950
1970	8,429
1980	9,874
1990	11,237
2000	13,157
2005	14,597
2007	15,261

== Transport ==
The municipality of Freienbach is traversed by three railway lines (Zurich–Ziegelbrücke, Pfäffikon–Arth-Goldau, Rapperswil–Pfäffikon) and served by six railway stations, all of which are located within fare zones 180 and 181 of the ZVV. Of these, the junction station Pfäffikon SZ is the most important, being served by both long distance InterRegio (IR) and Zurich S-Bahn trains (S#). The remaining stations are each served by a subset of the S-Bahn trains:

- Bäch is served by S8
- Freienbach SBB is served by S8
- Freienbach SOB is served by S40
- Hurden is served by S5 and S40
- Pfäffikon SZ is served by S2, S5, S8, S25, S40, IR35 and IR Voralpen Express
- Wilen bei Wollerau is served by S40

Pfäffikon and the island of Ufenau have landing stages served by boat cruises of ZSG.

== Sport ==
FC Freienbach is the municipality's football club.

== Heritage sites of national significance ==
The prehistoric lakeside settlement at Hurden/Seedamm and Ufnau, the parish church of St. Peter and Paul with Martin's Chapel, the Seedamm Cultural Center of Pfäffikon and Pfäffikon Castle are listed as Swiss heritage site of national significance. The prehistoric settlements at Hurden Rosshorn and Hurden Seefeld are part of the Prehistoric Pile dwellings around the Alps a UNESCO World Heritage Site.
