= Bäch railway station =

Railway station in Switzerland

Bäch
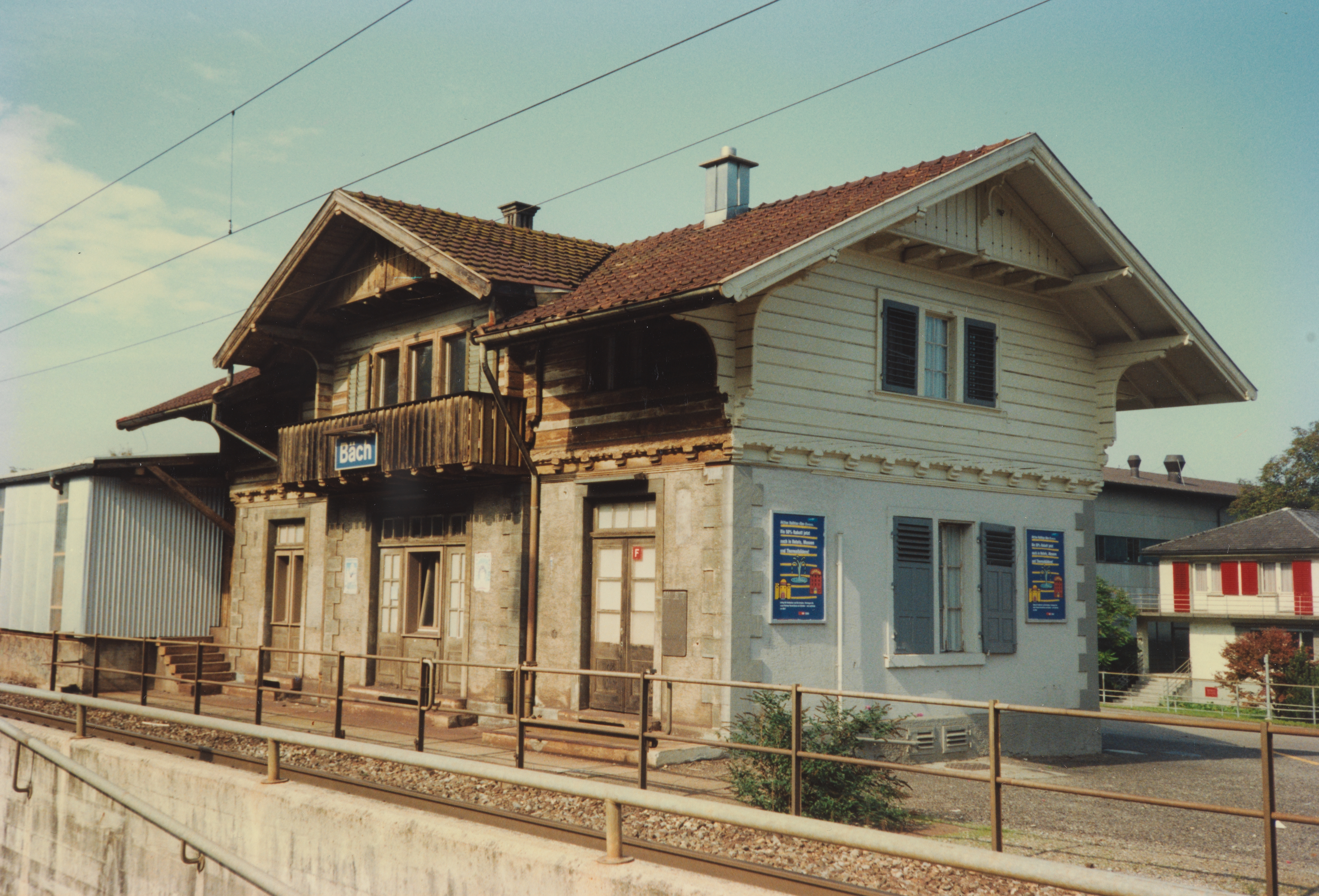

General information
- Location: Freienbach; Switzerland
- Coordinates: 47°12′04″N 8°43′37″E
- Elevation: 411 m (1,348 ft)
- Owner: Swiss Federal Railways
- Line: Lake Zürich left-bank line
- Platforms: 1 island platform
- Tracks: 2
- Train operators: Swiss Federal Railways
- Connections: Local buses

Other information
- Fare zone: 181 (ZVV)

Services
Preceding station	Zurich S-Bahn	Following station
Richterswil towards Winterthur	S8	Freienbach SBB towards Pfäffikon SZ
Richterswil towards Pfäffikon ZH	SN8 Limited service	Freienbach SBB towards Lachen
Location
- Location within Switzerland Location within Canton of Schwyz

Bäch railway station is a railway station in the Swiss canton of Schwyz and municipality of Freienbach. The station is located on the Lake Zurich left-bank railway line. It lies within fare zone 181 of the Zürcher Verkehrsverbund (ZVV).

== Services ==
Bäch railway station is an intermediate stop on Zurich S-Bahn service S8, between Winterthur and Pfaffikon SZ, via Zurich. As of the December 2023 timetable change, the following services call at Bäch:

- Zurich S-Bahn S8: half-hourly service between Pfäffikon SZ and Winterthur, via Zürich HB

During weekends, there is also a nighttime S-Bahn service (SN8) offered by ZVV.

- Nighttime S-Bahn (Friday and Saturday nights):
  - SN8: hourly service between Pfäffikon ZH and Lachen (via Zürich HB).

== See also ==
- Rail transport in Switzerland
