= Freienbach railway station =

Freienbach railway station may refer to:

- Freienbach SBB railway station on the Lake Zurich left-bank railway line in Switzerland
- Freienbach SOB railway station on the Pfäffikon SZ–Arth-Goldau railway line in Switzerland
