= Richterswil railway station =

Railway station in Richterswil, Switzerland

Richterswil
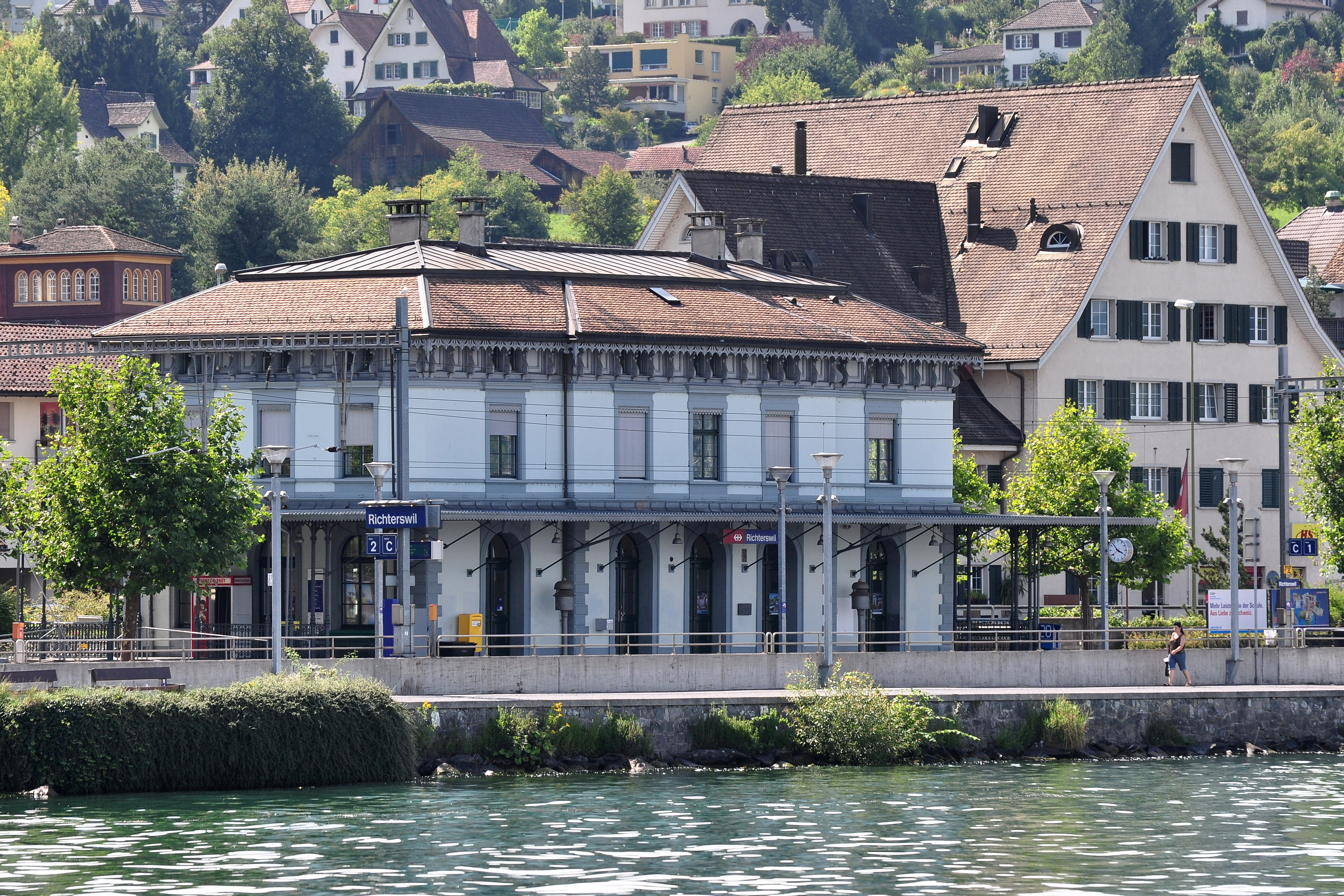
- The station building from Lake Zürich in 2011.

General information
- Location: Richterswil; Switzerland
- Coordinates: 47°12′30″N 8°42′27″E
- Elevation: 408 m (1,339 ft)
- Owner: Swiss Federal Railways
- Line: Lake Zurich left-bank line
- Platforms: 2 side platforms
- Tracks: 2
- Train operators: Swiss Federal Railways
- Connections: Zurich Transport Network (ZVV)
- Ship: ZSG boat lines
- Bus: Zimmerbergbus bus routes (BWS and SZU)

Other information
- Fare zone: 153 (ZVV)

History
- Opened: 1875

Services
| Preceding station | Zurich S-Bahn | Following station |
|---|---|---|
| Wädenswil towards Zurich Airport | S2 | Pfäffikon SZ towards Ziegelbrücke |
| Wädenswil towards Winterthur | S8 | Bäch towards Pfäffikon SZ |
| Wädenswil towards Pfäffikon ZH | SN8 Limited service | Bäch towards Lachen |
Location
- Location within Switzerland Location within Canton of Zürich

Richterswil railway station (German: Bahnhof Richterswil) is a railway station that serves the municipality of Richterswil in the canton of Zurich, Switzerland. The station is owned and operated by Swiss Federal Railways, and located on the Lake Zurich left-bank railway line. It lies within fare zone 153 of the Zürcher Verkehrsverbund (ZVV).

The railway station is situated at the south-eastern edge of the town centre, on the shore of Lake Zurich, a short distance to the south of the Zürichsee-Schifffahrtsgesellschaft (ZSG) ferry terminal.

The station building is inscribed on the Swiss Inventory of Cultural Property of National Significance (class A).

== History ==
Richterswil railway station was opened in 1875, along with the rest of the Zürich HB to Ziegelbrücke section of the Lake Zurich left-bank railway line.

== Facilities ==
Richterswil railway station has two tracks, flanked by a pair of side platforms. The station building is on the platform on the landward side of the station, flanking track 1. Both platforms are connected by a pedestrian subway, which also connects to the town centre on the landward side, and the ZSG ferry terminal on the lake side. Buses depart from the station forecourt.

== Services ==
Richterswil railway station is only served by S-Bahn regional trains, with long-distance trains passing through.

=== Rail ===
The station is served by the following lines of the Zurich S-Bahn, operated by Swiss Federal Railways:

- S2 Zürich Flughafen –Oerlikon–Zürich HB–Thalwil–Pfäffikon SZ–Ziegelbrücke
  Stops between Zürich Enge and Ziegelbrücke only in Thalwil, Horgen, Wädenswil, Richterswil, Pfäffikon SZ, Altendorf, Lachen and Siebnen-Wangen.
- S8 Winterthur–Wallisellen–Oerlikon–Zürich HB–Thalwil–Freienbach SBB-Pfäffikon SZ (–Ziegelbrücke)
  Operates non stop between Winterthur and Effretikon; first and last services extended to Ziegelbrücke.

The two services each operate every half-hour during the day, combining to provide four trains per hour to and from Zurich, with a journey time of between 30 and 40 minutes.

During weekends, there is also a nighttime S-Bahn service (SN8) offered by ZVV.

- Nighttime S-Bahn (Friday and Saturday nights):
  - SN8: hourly service between Pfäffikon ZH and Lachen (via Zürich HB).

=== Bus ===
Three Zimmerberg bus lines call at Richterswil.

| Line | Route |
|---|---|
| 170 | Richterswil ZH – Burghalden – Samstagern |
| 175 | Richterswil ZH – Oswäldli |
| 176 | Richterswil ZH – Roos |

=== Boat ===
ZSG boat lines depart from the landing stage adjacent to the railway station, in direction to either Zurich Bürkliplatz or Rapperswil/Schmerikon, serving terminals of several lakeside towns and Ufenau island en route.

== See also ==
- History of rail transport in Switzerland
- Rail transport in Switzerland
