= Lützelau =

Island in Lake Zurich, Switzerland

Coordinates: 47°13′15.97″N 8°47′35.49″E

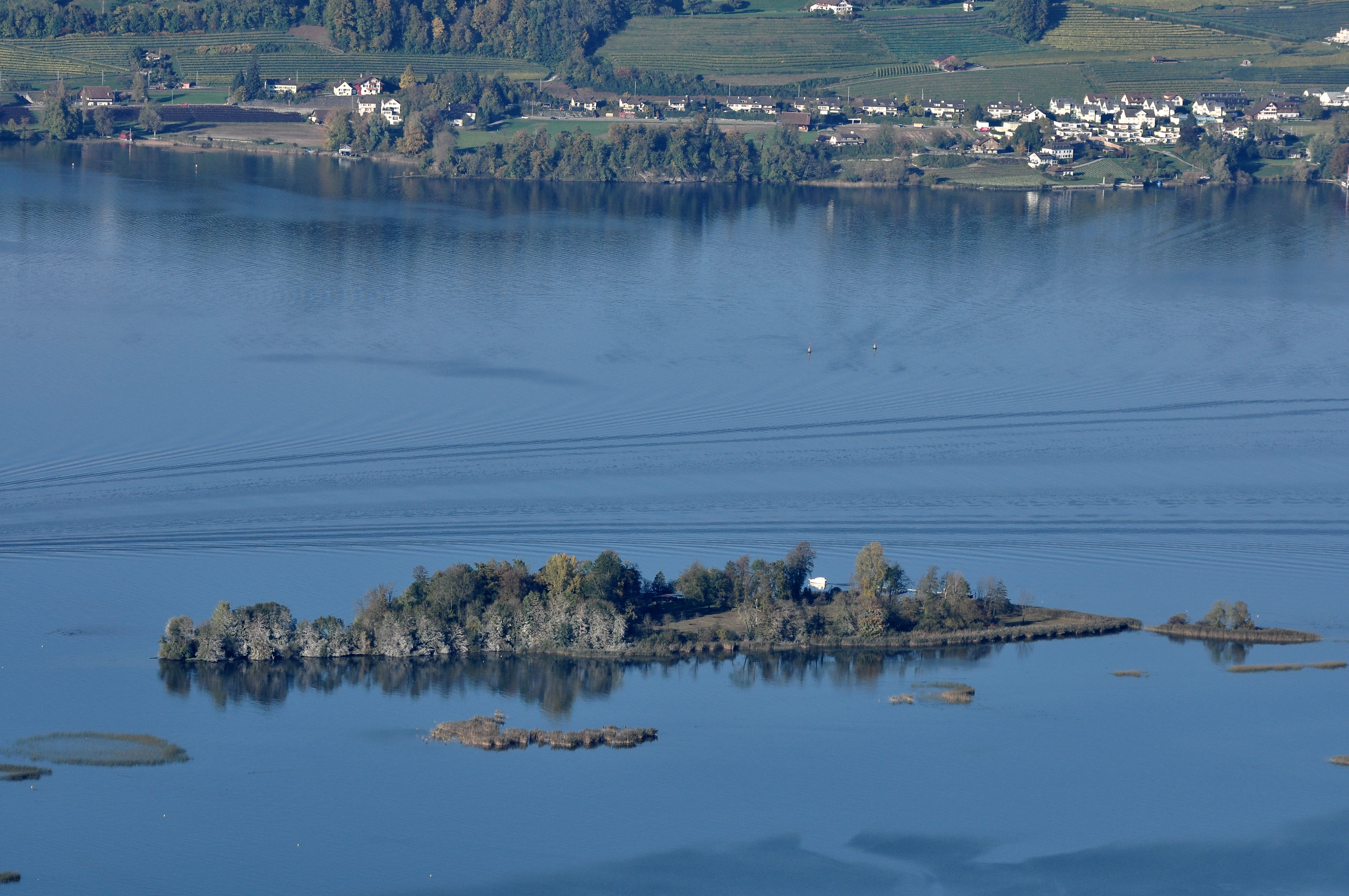
- Lützelau as seen from the Etzel, Ufenau to the left

- Location within Switzerland Location within Canton of Schwyz

Geography
- Location: Lake Zurich
- Highest elevation: 414 m (1358 ft)

Administration
- Switzerland
- Canton: Schwyz
- District: Höfe

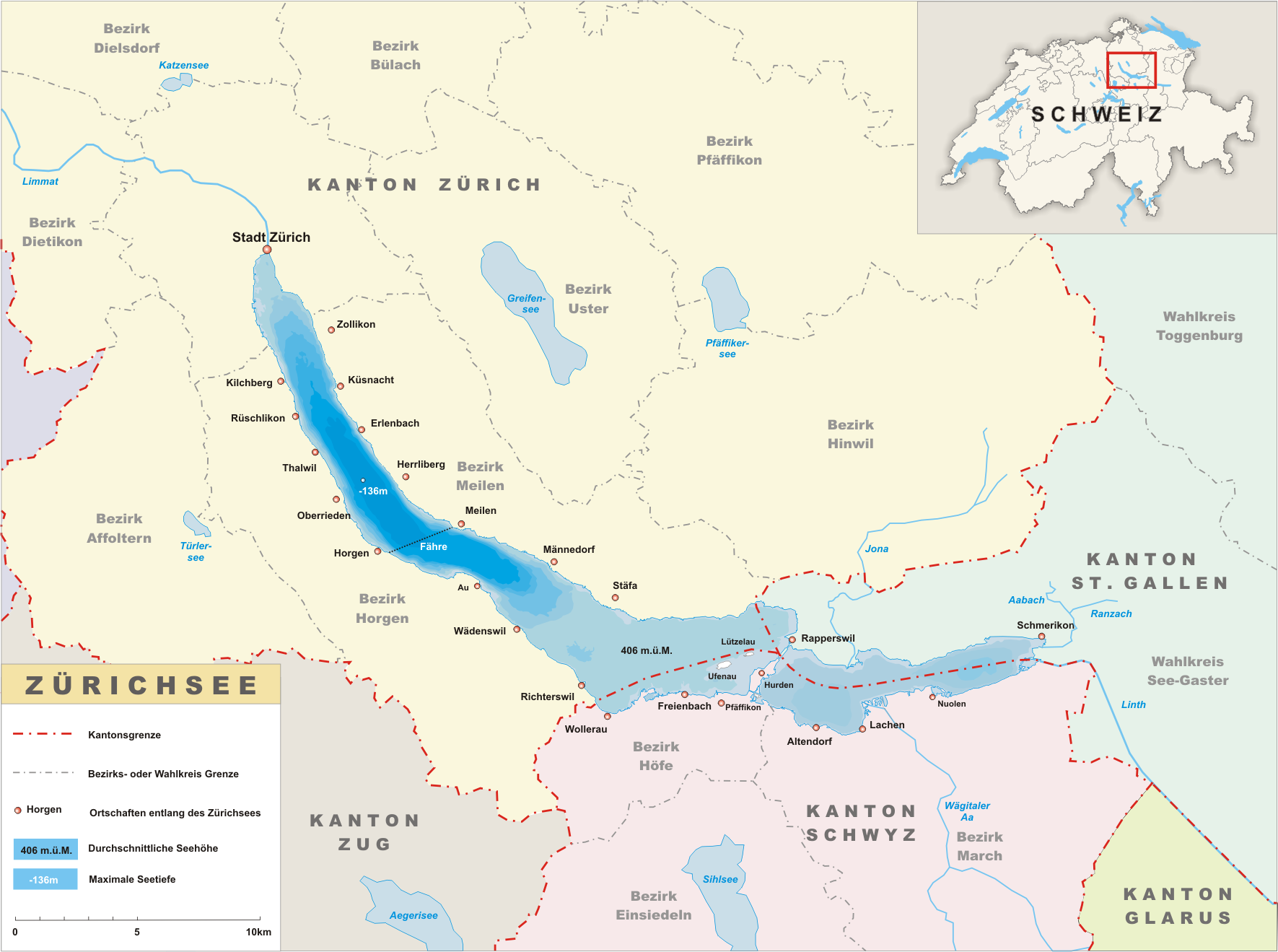
Map of Lake Zurich

Lützelau (German pronunciation: [ˈlʏtsəlaʊ]; Old High German: little island) is an island located, with the neighbouring island of Ufenau, in Lake Zurich in Switzerland between Rapperswil (1.6 km (0.99 mi) away) and Freienbach (3 km (1.9 mi) away).

== Geography ==
Lützelau lies in Höfe district in the Canton of Schwyz. Since the 13th/14th centuries, it has belonged to the community of Rapperswil (now called Ortsbürgergemeinde). The island measures 33,480 m^{2} (360,400 sq ft) in all, 430 m (1,410 ft) from east to west and 150 m (490 ft) from north to south. The highest point of the island is 414 m (1,358 ft) above sea level or 8 m (26 ft) above lake level at 406 m (1,332 ft).

On occasion of the formation of the Alps, the fossilized sediment material of the body of water between the Ricken and Etzel chains unfolded. There arose the typical rock bands that form the Lindenhof hill in Rapperswil, or the islands of Ufnau, Lützelau and Heilighüsli. During the last Ice Age the island was under a thick layer of ice, and the hard layers of conglomerate rock and the sandstone ridge survived the sanding by the glacier.

== History ==
First mentioned in the year 741, there was formerly a nunnery here, given by the Alamannic noblewoman Beata, daughter of Rachinbert and wife of Landolt. In the year 744, the nunnery, or abbey, was sold to Einsiedeln Abbey. Historians mention a 10th-century ferry station assumably at the so-called Einsiedlerhaus in Rapperswil – in 981 AD as well as the vineyard on the Lindenhof hill – between Kempraten on lake shore, Lützelau and Ufenau island and assumably present Hurden, which allowed the pilgrims towards Einsiedeln to cross the lake before the prehistoric bridge at the Seedamm isthmus was re-built in 1358.

In the late Middle Ages, Einsiedeln sold the island to the Counts of Rapperswil who used its sandstone besides the Bollingen quarries to build the town of Rapperswil. On 12 May 1433 Heini Murer von Grueningen and his wife Anna Keller confirmed the transfer of their lands on Lutzelnoew for 100 Pfund Pfennig Zürcher Währung to the Abbot Johans and the convent of the Rüti Abbey, including buildings and lands in the Herrschaft Grüningen, and to be enrolled in the abbey's libri anniversariorum (German: Jahrzeitbuch).

From the 16th century the Hospital of the Holy Ghost (Heiliggeistspital) of the city of Rapperswil was located here, which from 1810 was a quarantine hospital, in Swiss German Siechenhaus which in ancient times was situation in Kempraten. Remains of the former abbey church (8th century) were found in 1964.

== Transport ==
The island has a small restaurant and a campsite. Tourist boat trips – run by the Zürichsee-Schifffahrtsgesellschaft – sail from Zürich and Rapperswil to the island of Ufenau only; to Lützelau there is a commercial "island taxi" service from Rapperswil between May and September.

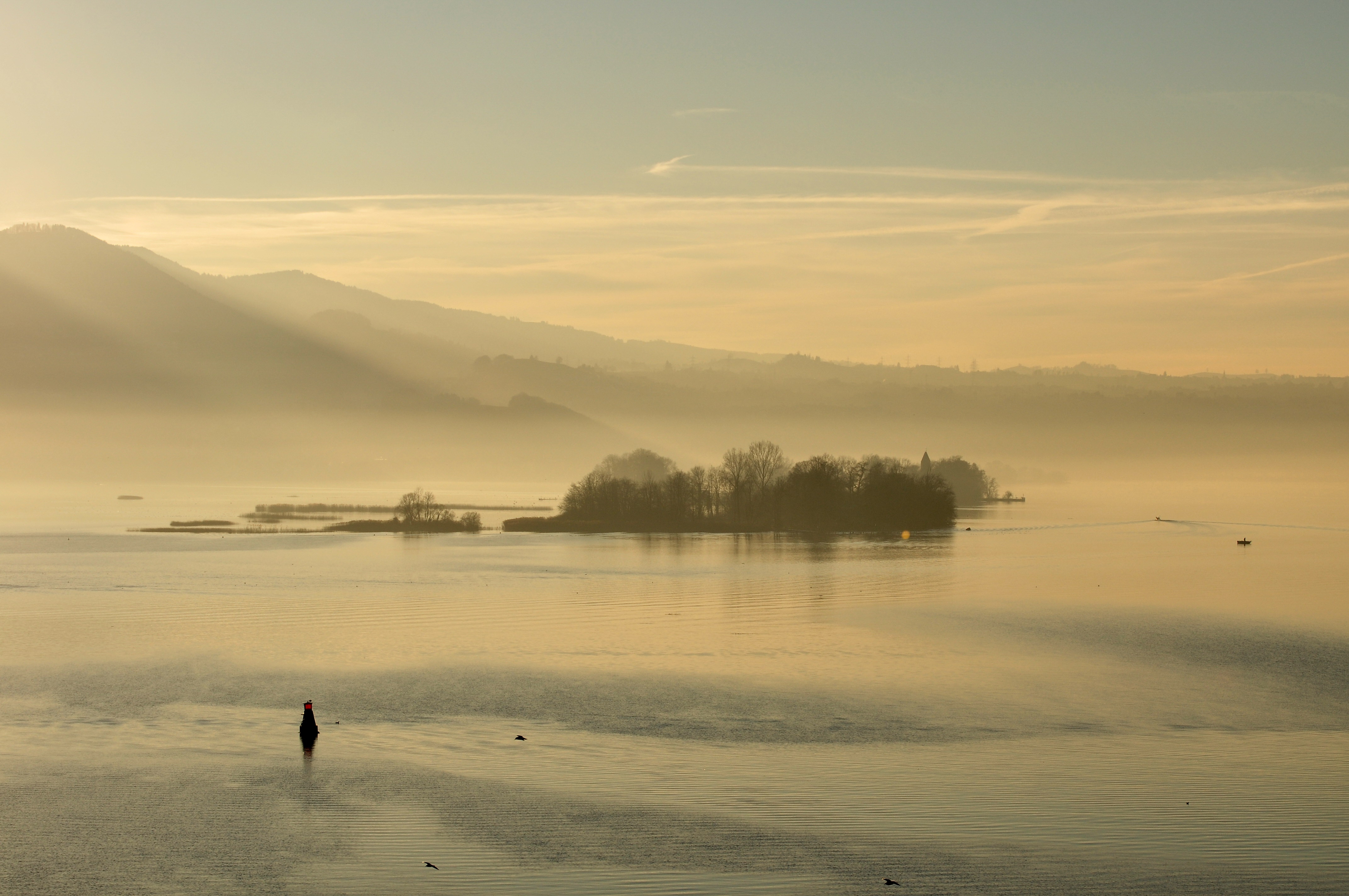
Lützelau as seen from Lindenhof in Rapperswil

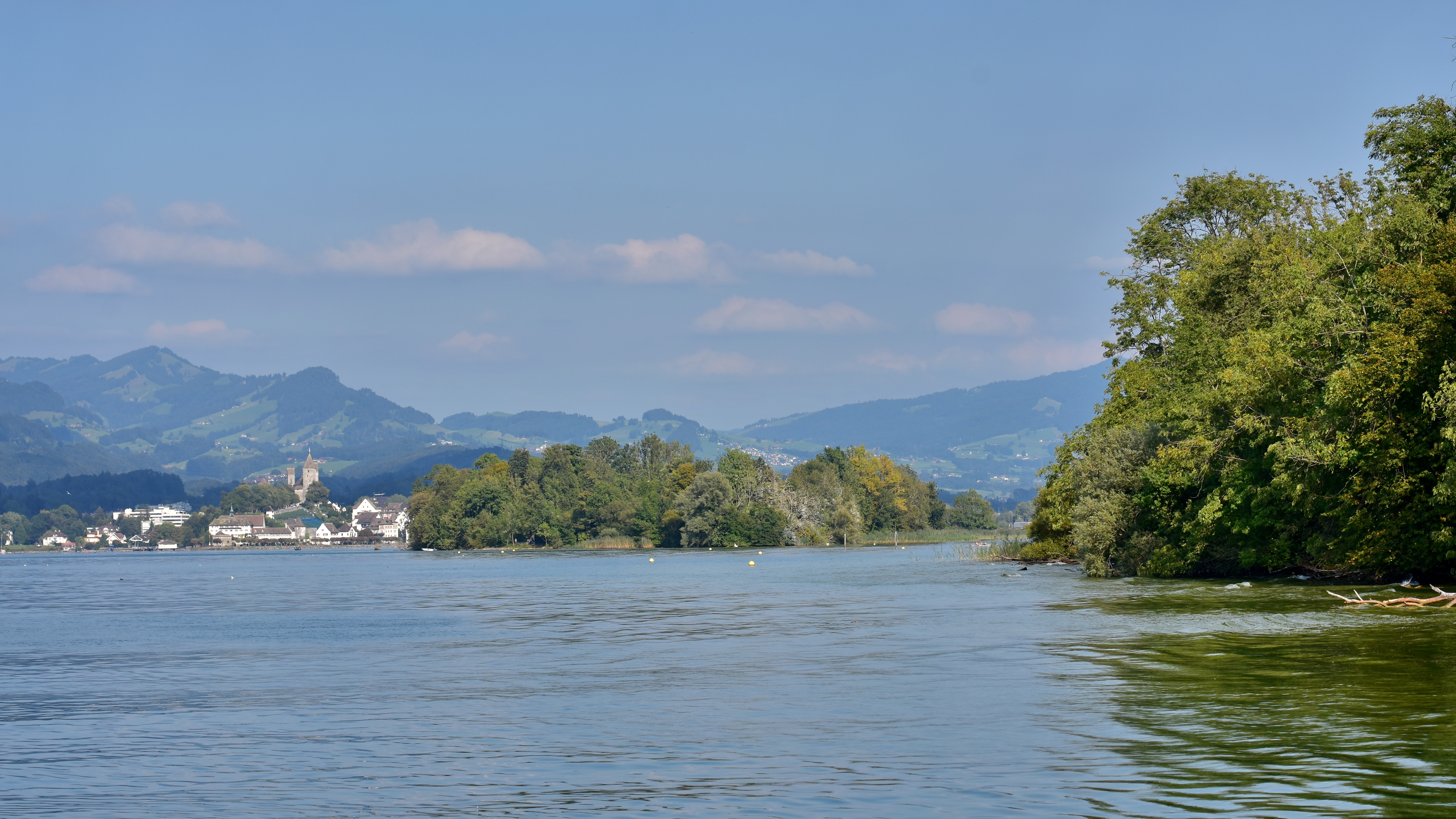
Rapperswil, Lützelau and Ufenau islands as seen from ZSG ship MS Helvetia

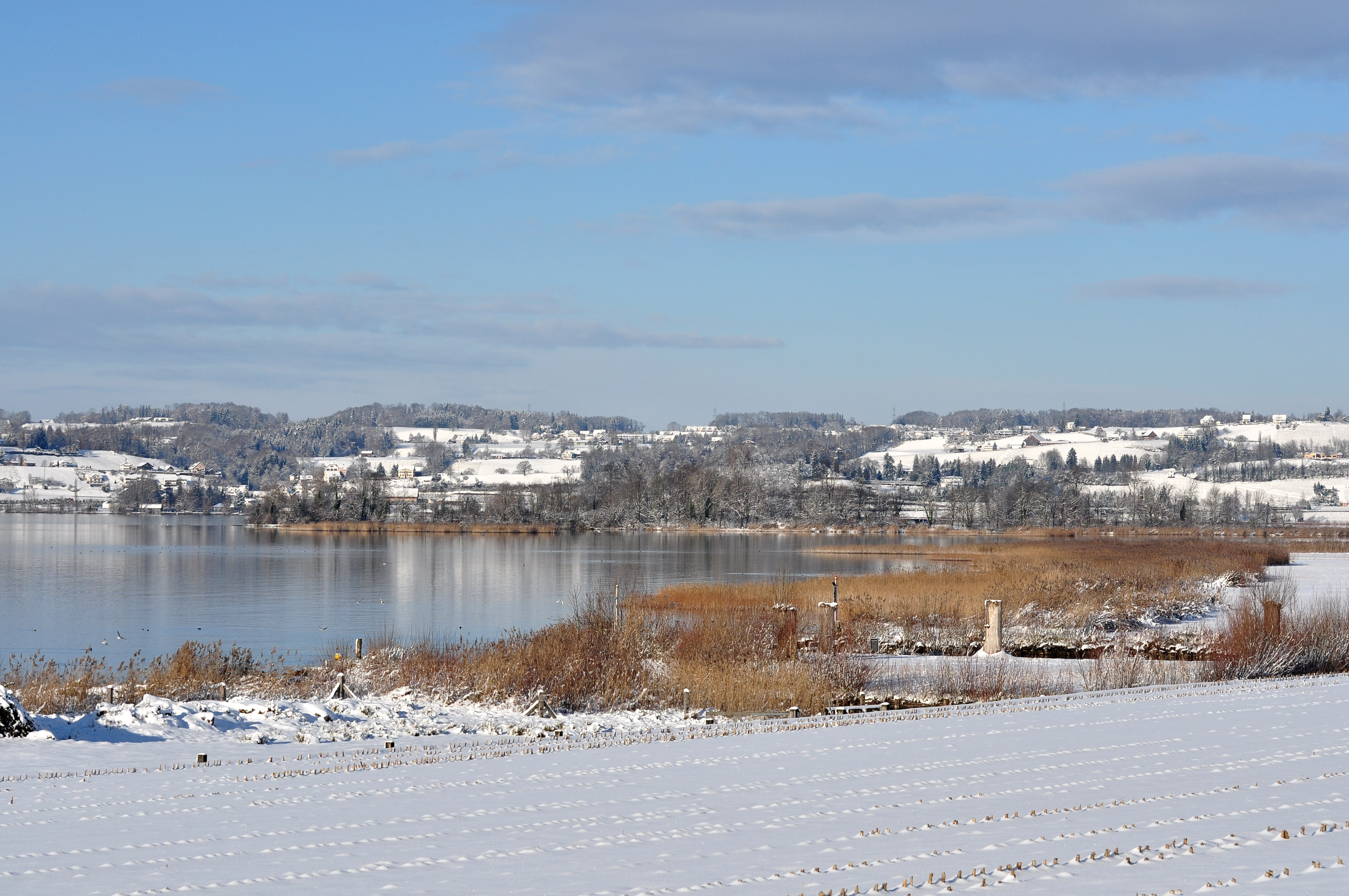
Lützelau as seen from Frauenwinkel protected area

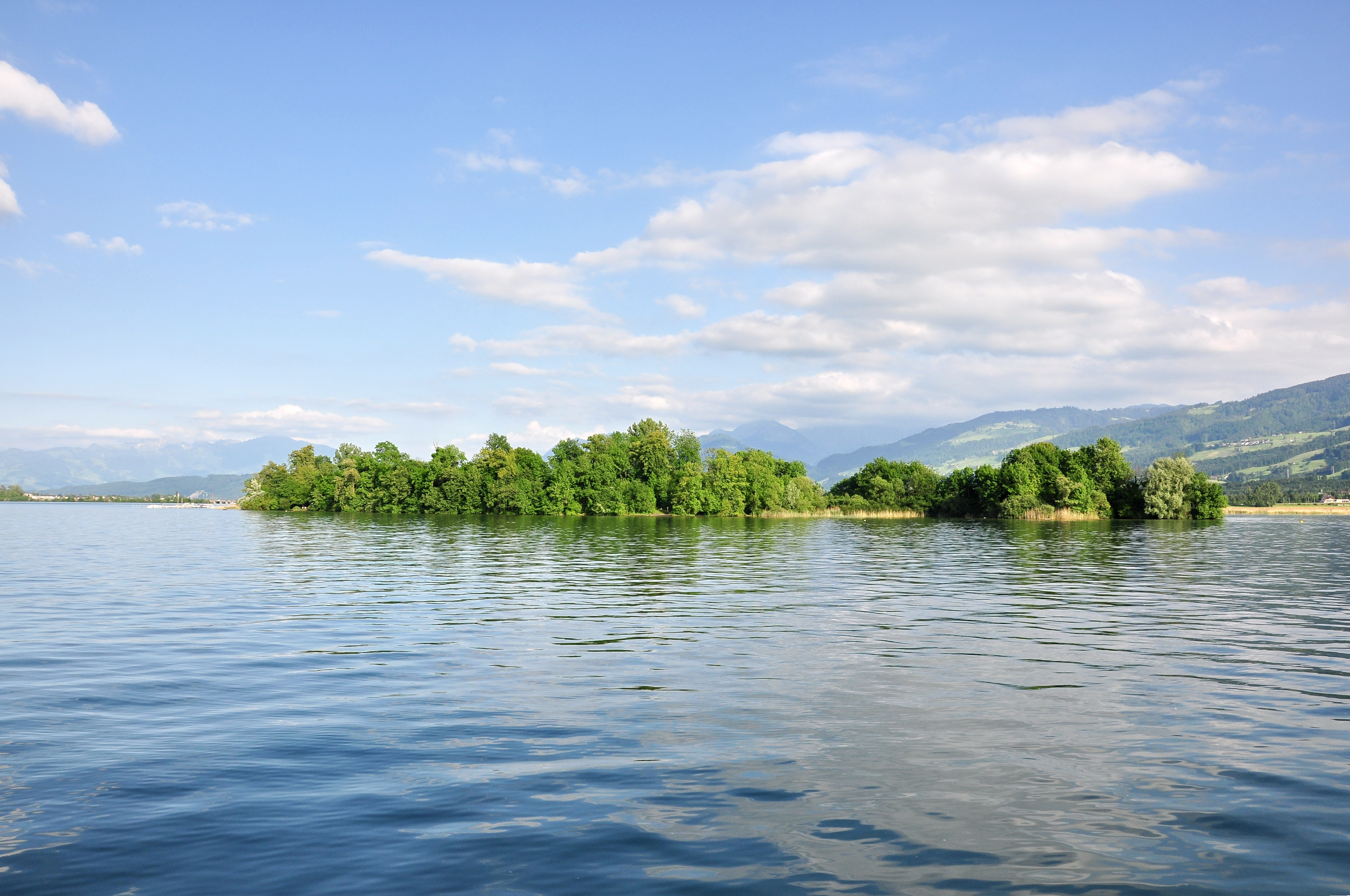
Lützelau as seen from the west

== Protection ==
In 1927 the Ufenau and the Lützelau islands, as well as the so-called Frauenwinkel area at the Seedamm area towards Hurden were placed under conservation, being since 1993 a «Moorlandschaft von besonderer Schönheit und nationaler Bedeutung», i.e. a bog environment of extraordinary beauty and national importance. Swimming, camping and other leisure activities are permitted on Lützelau campsite, but forbidden on Ufnau, as well within the Frauenwinkel lake area.

== See also ==
- List of islands of Switzerland
