= Pfäffikon, Schwyz =

Coordinates: 47°12′N 8°46′E

Pfäffikon
- Former municipality
- Flag Coat of arms
- Location of Pfäffikon
- Location within Switzerland Location within Canton of Schwyz
- Country: Switzerland
- Canton: Schwyz
- District: Höfe
- Municipality: Freienbach
- Time zone: UTC+01:00 (CET)
  - Summer (DST): UTC+02:00 (CEST)
- ISO 3166 code: CH-SZ
- Website: www.freienbach.ch

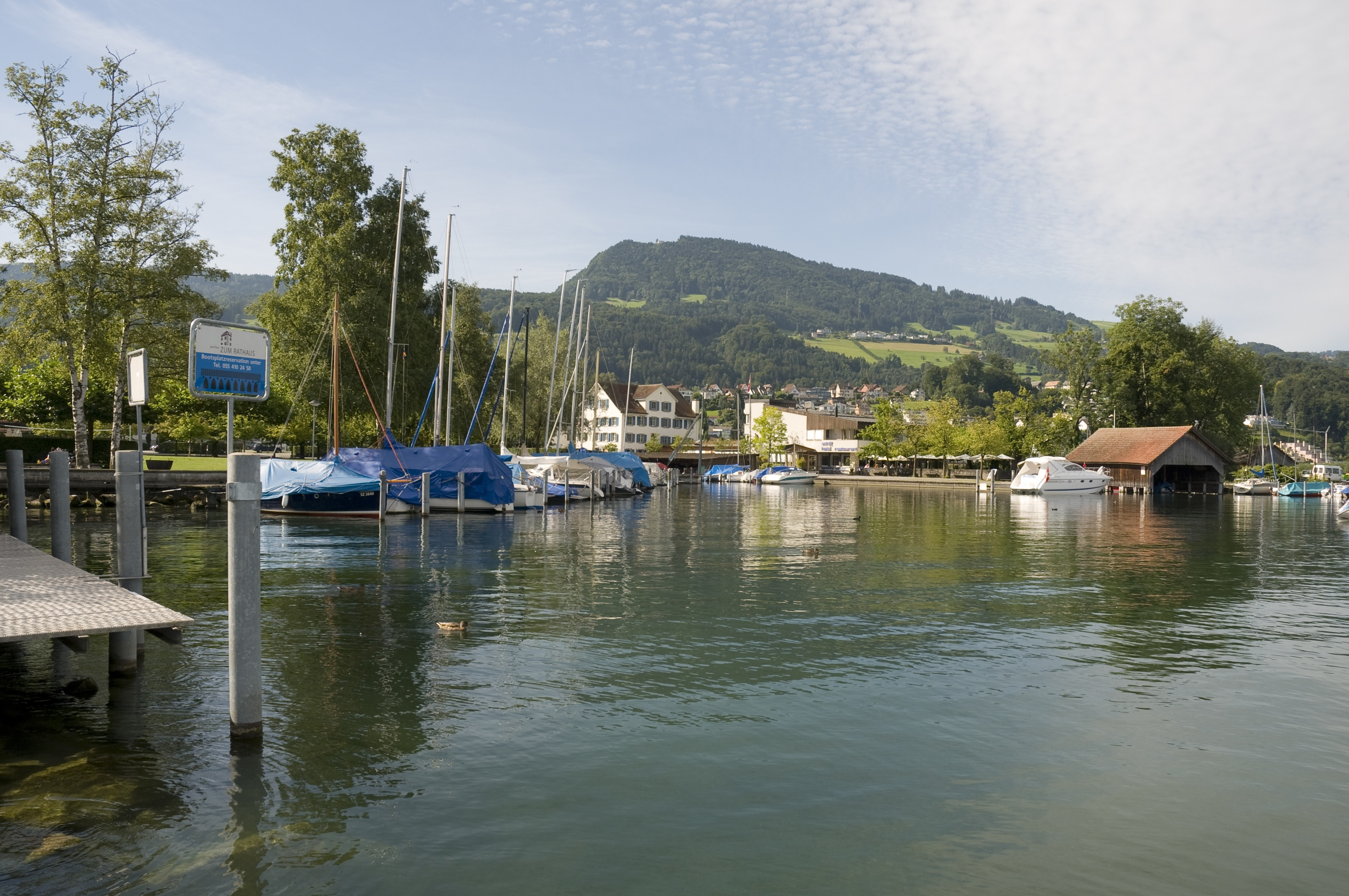
Pfäffikon at the Lake of Zurich

Aerial view of Hurden, Pfäffikon from 300 m by Walter Mittelholzer (1924)

Pfäffikon is a former municipality and principal town of the municipality of Freienbach in the canton of Schwyz, Switzerland. Together with Wollerau, Pfäffikon is considered the principal town of the district (Bezirk) of Höfe and the center of the region of Ausserschwyz. The former farm town is known for its focus on hedge funds. With 7,554 residents, Pfäffikon is the third biggest town in the canton after Küssnacht and Einsiedeln.

== Politics ==
Pfäffikon, together with Wilen bei Wollerau, Freienbach, Bäch and Hurden, form the Municipality of Freienbach.

In 1848, Pfäffikon lost its independent status and was subsequently merged into Freienbach.

== Education ==
Pfäffikon offers 8 kindergartens, 3 primary schools and one secondary school, as well as one of the two cantonwide schools and an open university.

Private schools:

- SIS Swiss International School, Pfäffikon-Schwyz

== Transportation ==
The municipality is located on the A3 motorway.

Pfäffikon SZ railway station is a terminal of the Zürich S-Bahn on the line S5, a stop on the line S40 heading to Rapperswil, and on the lines S2, S8 and S25 via Horgen on the left side of Lake Zurich. Journey times from Zürich Hauptbahnhof vary from 25 minutes to over 40 minutes.

== People ==
- Gabriela Sabatini (born 1970), Argentine tennis player
- Beatrice Egli (born 1988), singer
