= Wollerau =

- Municipality
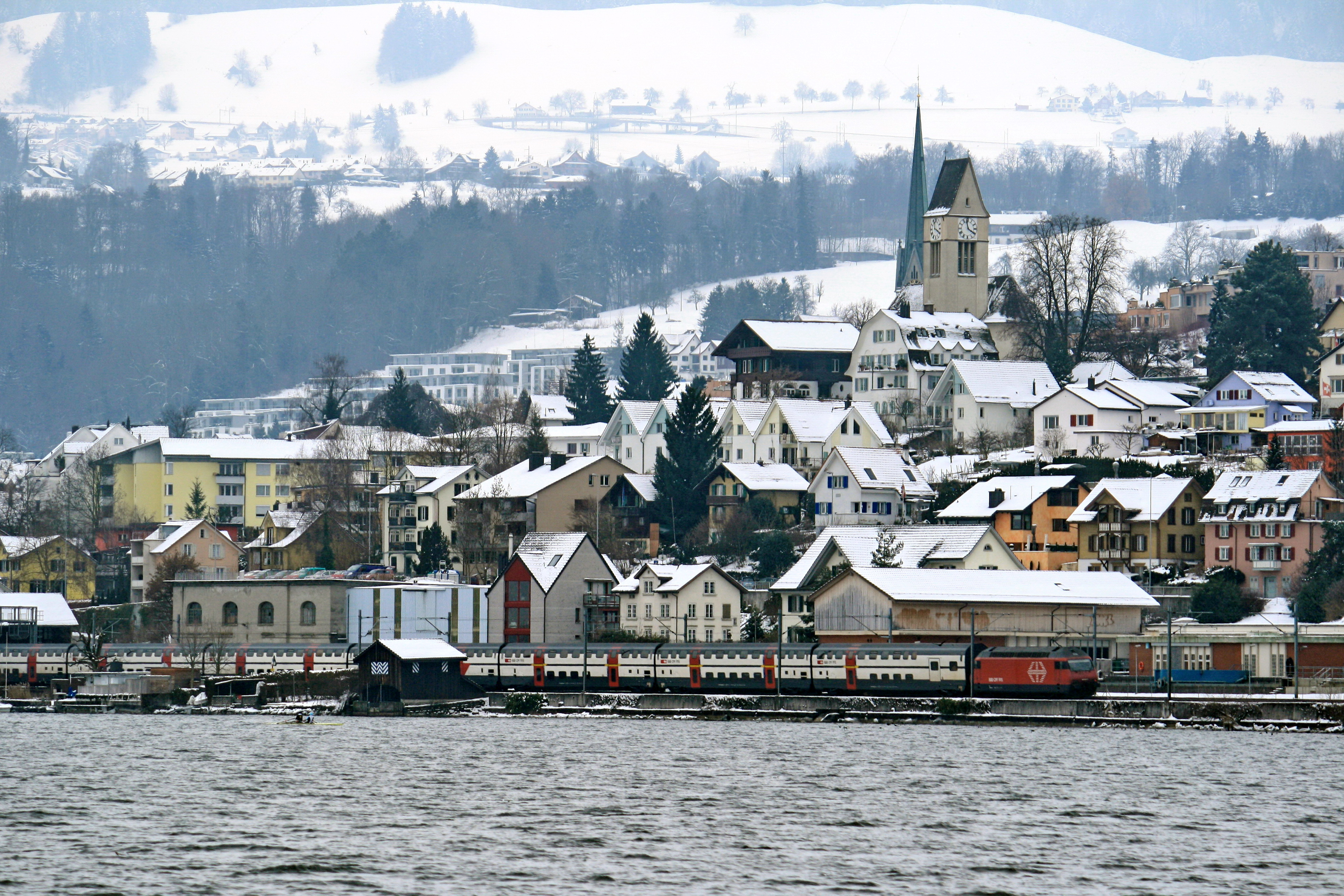

- Coat of arms
- Location of Wollerau
- Location within Switzerland Location within Canton of Schwyz
- Coordinates: 47°11′N 8°43′E
- Country: Switzerland
- Canton: Schwyz
- District: Höfe

Area
  - Total: 6.50 km^{2} (2.51 sq mi)
- Elevation: 514 m (1,686 ft)

Population (December 2020)
  - Total: 7,385
  - Density: 1,140/km^{2} (2,940/sq mi)
- Time zone: UTC+01:00 (CET)
  - Summer (DST): UTC+02:00 (CEST)
- Postal code: 8832
- SFOS number: 1323
- ISO 3166 code: CH-SZ
- Surrounded by: Feusisberg, Freienbach, Hütten (ZH), Richterswil (ZH)
- Website: www.wollerau.ch

Wollerau is a municipality in Höfe District in the canton of Schwyz in Switzerland. It lies on the upper Zürichsee.

== Geography ==
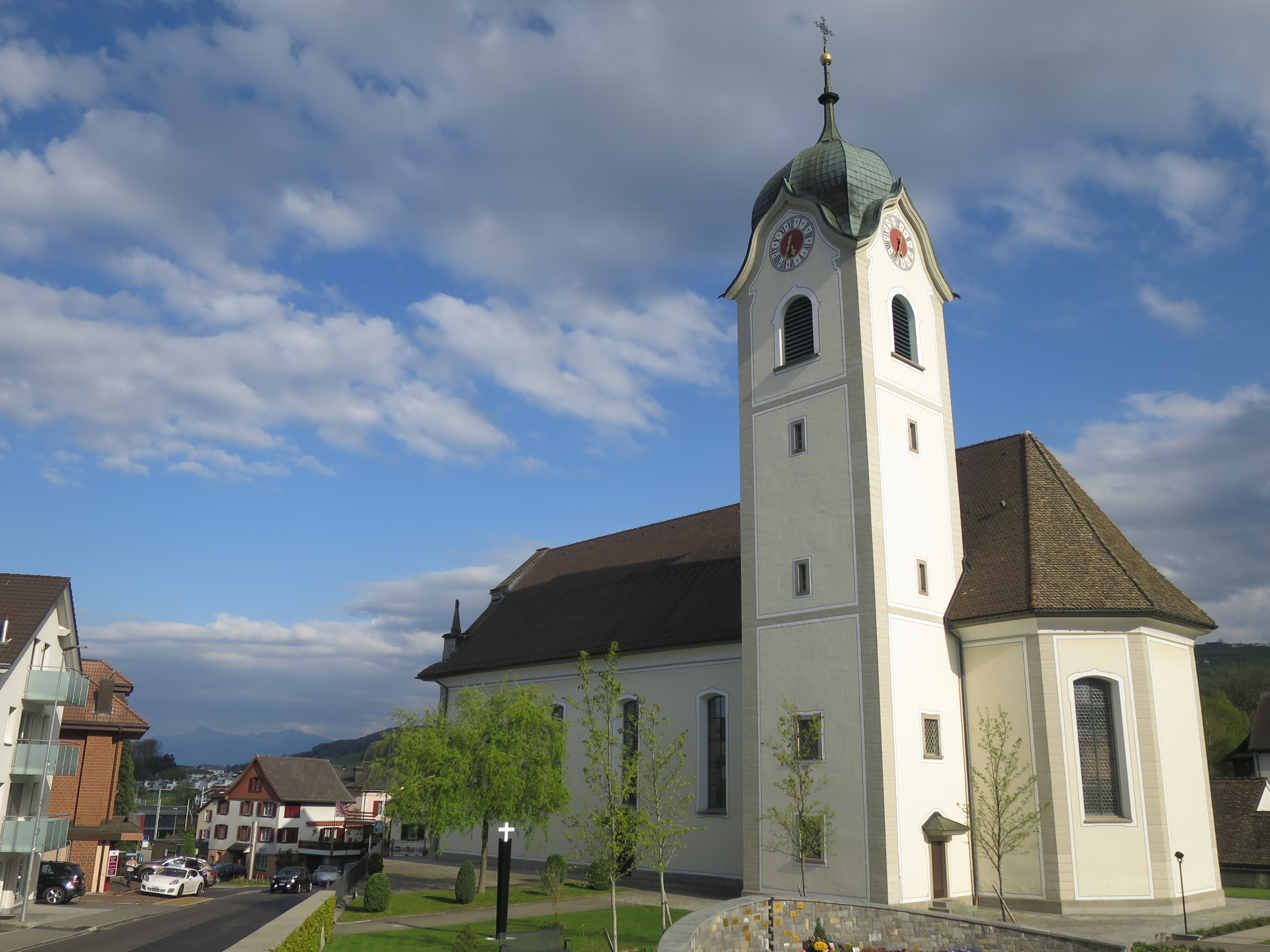
Wollerau and the St. Verena church

Aerial view (1954)

Wollerau has an area, as of 2006, of 6.3 km^{2} (2.4 sq mi). Of this area, 56.9% is used for agricultural purposes, while 13.6% is forested. Of the rest of the land, 24.9% is settled (buildings or roads) and the remainder (4.6%) is non-productive (rivers, glaciers or mountains).

== Demographics ==
Wollerau has a population (as of 31 December 2020) of 7,385. As of 2007, 19.7% of the population was made up of foreign nationals. Over the last 10 years the population has grown at a rate of 16.7%. Most of the population (as of 2000) speaks German (88.8%), with English being second most common ( 2.1%) and Italian being third ( 1.7%).

As of 2000 the gender distribution of the population was 51.5% male and 48.5% female. The age distribution, as of 2008, in Wollerau is; 1,348 people or 22.2% of the population is between 0 and 19. 1,767 people or 29.1% are 20 to 39, and 2,286 people or 37.6% are 40 to 64. The senior population distribution is 375 people or 6.2% are 65 to 74. There are 209 people or 3.4% who are 70 to 79 and 89 people or 1.47% of the population who are over 80.

As of 2000 there are 2,563 households, of which 732 households (or about 28.6%) contain only a single individual. 122 or about 4.8% are large households, with at least five members.

In the 2007 election, the most popular party was the SVP which received 41.1% of the vote. The next three most popular parties were the FDP (29.6%), the CVP (13.8%) and the SPS (10.4%).

In Wollerau about 79.4% of the population (between age 25-64) have completed either non-mandatory upper secondary education or additional higher education (either university or a Fachhochschule).

Wollerau has an unemployment rate of 1.39%. As of 2005, there were 94 people employed in the primary economic sector and about 26 businesses involved in this sector. 774 people are employed in the secondary sector and there are 97 businesses in this sector. 1,819 people are employed in the tertiary sector, with 416 businesses in this sector.

From the 2000 census, 3,180 or 52.4% are Roman Catholic, while 1,755 or 28.9% belonged to the Swiss Reformed Church. Of the rest of the population, there are 7 individuals (or about 0.12% of the population) who belong to the Christian Catholic faith, there are 58 individuals (or about 0.95% of the population) who belong to the Orthodox Church, and there are 29 individuals (or about 0.48% of the population) who belong to another Christian church. There are 12 individuals (or about 0.20% of the population) who are Jewish, and 191 (or about 3.14% of the population) who are Islamic. There are 60 individuals (or about 0.99% of the population) who belong to another church (not listed on the census), 623 (or about 10.26% of the population) belong to no church, are agnostic or atheist, and 159 individuals (or about 2.62% of the population) did not answer the question.

The historical population is given in the following table:

year	population
1950	1,969
1960	2,415
1970	3,441
1980	3,934
1985	4,353
1990	5,003
2000	6,143
2005	6,788
2007	6,853
2010	6,973
2014	7,113
2015	6,994
2016	7,028
2017	7,037
2018	7,207
2019	7,274
2020	7,432
2021	7,472
2022	7,413

== Industry ==
Wollerau is home to Intamin, a world leader in the manufacturing of rollercoasters. Intamin is famous for many world class rollercoasters.

== Notable residents ==
Because of its tax structure, Wollerau is also home to some internationally well known celebrities, including tennis player Roger Federer and former Formula One driver Felipe Massa.

Tennis player Belinda Bencic was born and raised in Wollerau.

== Transport ==
Wollerau railway station and Riedmatt railway station are both within the municipality. Both stations are stops of the Zurich S-Bahn service S40, from Einsiedeln to Rapperswil.

The municipality is located on the A3 motorway just a 20-minute drive from Zürich.
