= Wilen bei Wollerau railway station =

Railway station in Freienbach, Schwyz, Switzerland

Wilen bei Wollerau

General information
- Location: Wilenstrasse; Freienbach, Schwyz; Switzerland
- Coordinates: 47.197849°N 8.734753°E
- Elevation: 495 m (1,624 ft)
- Owner: Südostbahn
- Operator: Südostbahn
- Line: Pfäffikon SZ–Arth-Goldau line
- Platforms: 1 side platform
- Tracks: 1
- Connections
- Bus: PostAuto bus routes 180

Other information
- Fare zone: 181 (ZVV)

Services
Preceding station	Zurich S-Bahn	Following station
Wollerau towards Einsiedeln	S40	Freienbach SOB towards Rapperswil
Location
- Location within Switzerland Location within Canton of Schwyz

Wilen bei Wollerau is a railway station in the Swiss canton of Schwyz and municipality of Freienbach. The station is located on the Pfäffikon SZ–Arth-Goldau railway line, owned by the Südostbahn, within fare zone 181 of the Zürcher Verkehrsverbund (ZVV).

== Services ==
The station is an intermediate stop on Zurich S-Bahn service S40, from Einsiedeln to Rapperswil. As of the December 2023 timetable change, the following services call at Wilen bei Wollerau:

- Zurich S-Bahn S40: half-hourly service between Rapperswil and Einsiedeln, via Biberbrugg

== See also ==
- Rail transport in Switzerland
