= Hurden railway station =

Railway station in Freienbach, Switzerland

Hurden
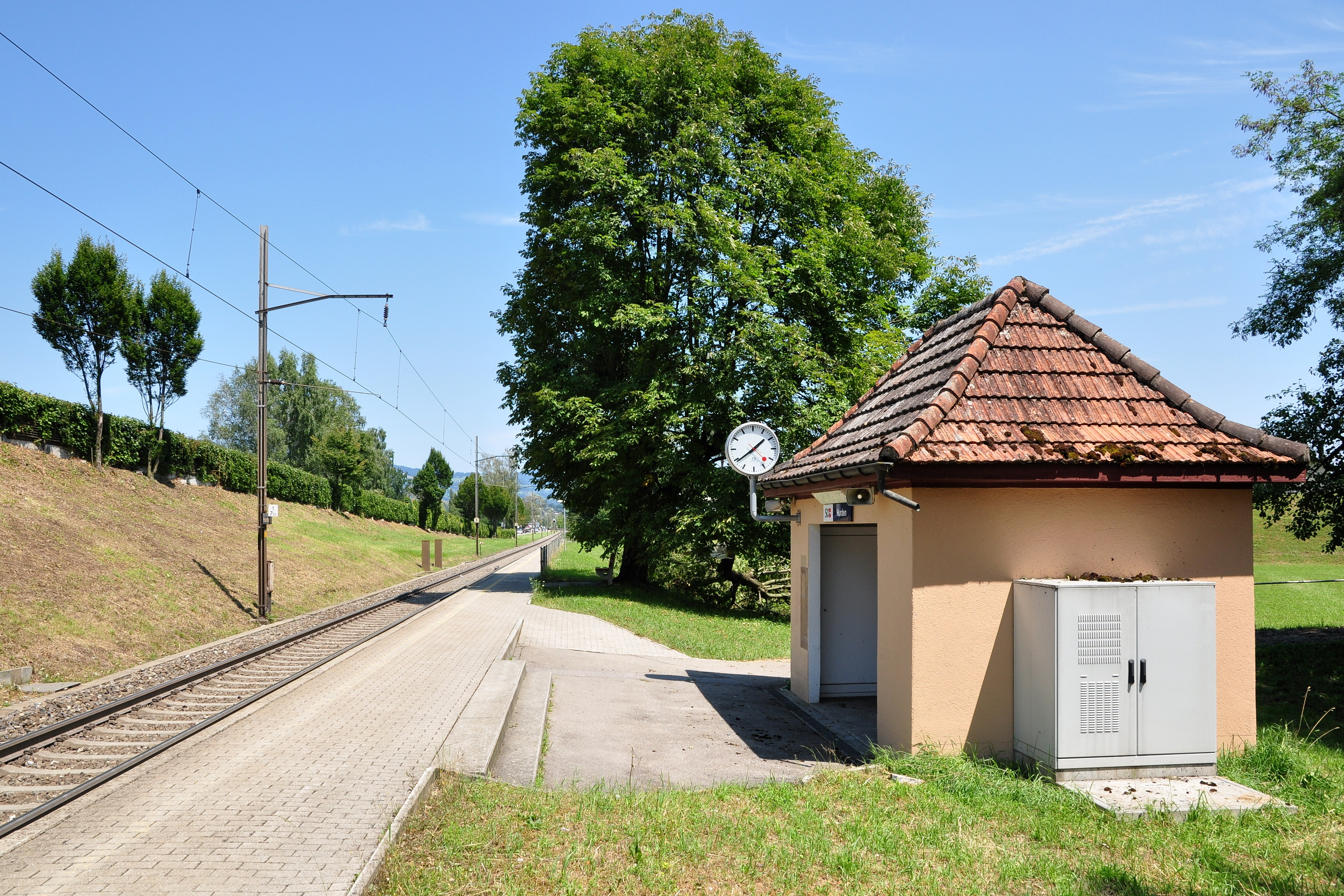
- The station in 2011

General information
- Location: Hurden; Freienbach, Schwyz; Switzerland
- Coordinates: 47.213629°N 8.80066°E
- Elevation: 411 m (1,348 ft)
- Owner: Südostbahn
- Operator: Südostbahn
- Line: Rapperswil–Pfäffikon
- Platforms: 1 side platform
- Tracks: 1

Other information
- Fare zone: 180 (ZVV)

Services
Preceding station	Zurich S-Bahn	Following station
Pfäffikon SZ towards Einsiedeln	S40	Rapperswil Terminus
Pfäffikon SZ Terminus	SN5 Limited service	Rapperswil towards Knonau
Location
- Location within Switzerland Location within Canton of Schwyz

Hurden railway station is a railway station in the municipality of Freienbach in the Swiss canton of Schwyz, located within fare zone 180 of the Zürcher Verkehrsverbund (ZVV). The station is located on the Rapperswil to Pfäffikon line that crosses the Seedamm between the two shores of Lake Zurich. It takes its name from the nearby village of Hurden.

== Services ==
The station is an intermediate stop on Zurich S-Bahn service S40. During weekends, there is also a nighttime S-Bahn service (SN5) offered by ZVV.

- Zurich S-Bahn:
  - S40: half-hourly service between Rapperswil and Einsiedeln via Pfäffikon SZ and Biberbrugg.
  - Nighttime S-Bahn (only during weekends):
    - SN5: hourly service between Knonau and Pfäffikon SZ (via Zürich HB).

== See also ==
- Rail transport in Switzerland
