= Riedmatt railway station =

Railway station in Switzerland

Riedmatt

General information
- Location: Riedmatt; Wollerau, Schwyz; Switzerland
- Coordinates: 47.196846°N 8.712078°E
- Elevation: 551 m (1,808 ft)
- Owner: Südostbahn
- Operator: Südostbahn
- Line: Pfäffikon SZ–Arth-Goldau line
- Platforms: 1 side platform
- Tracks: 1

Other information
- Fare zone: 181 (ZVV)

Services
| Preceding station | Zurich S-Bahn | Following station |
|---|---|---|
| Samstagern towards Einsiedeln | S40 | Wollerau towards Rapperswil |
Location
- Location within Switzerland Location within Canton of Schwyz

Riedmatt, or Riedmatt SZ, is a railway station in the Swiss canton of Schwyz (SZ) and municipality of Wollerau. The station is located on the Pfäffikon SZ–Arth-Goldau railway line, owned by the Südostbahn, within fare zone 181 of the Zürcher Verkehrsverbund (ZVV).

== Services ==
The station is an intermediate stop on Zurich S-Bahn service S40, from Einsiedeln to Rapperswil. As of the December 2023 timetable change, the following services call at Riedmatt:

- Zurich S-Bahn S40: half-hourly service between Rapperswil and Einsiedeln, via Biberbrugg

== See also ==
- Rail transport in Switzerland
