= Wollerau railway station =

Railway station in Wollerau, Switzerland

Wollerau
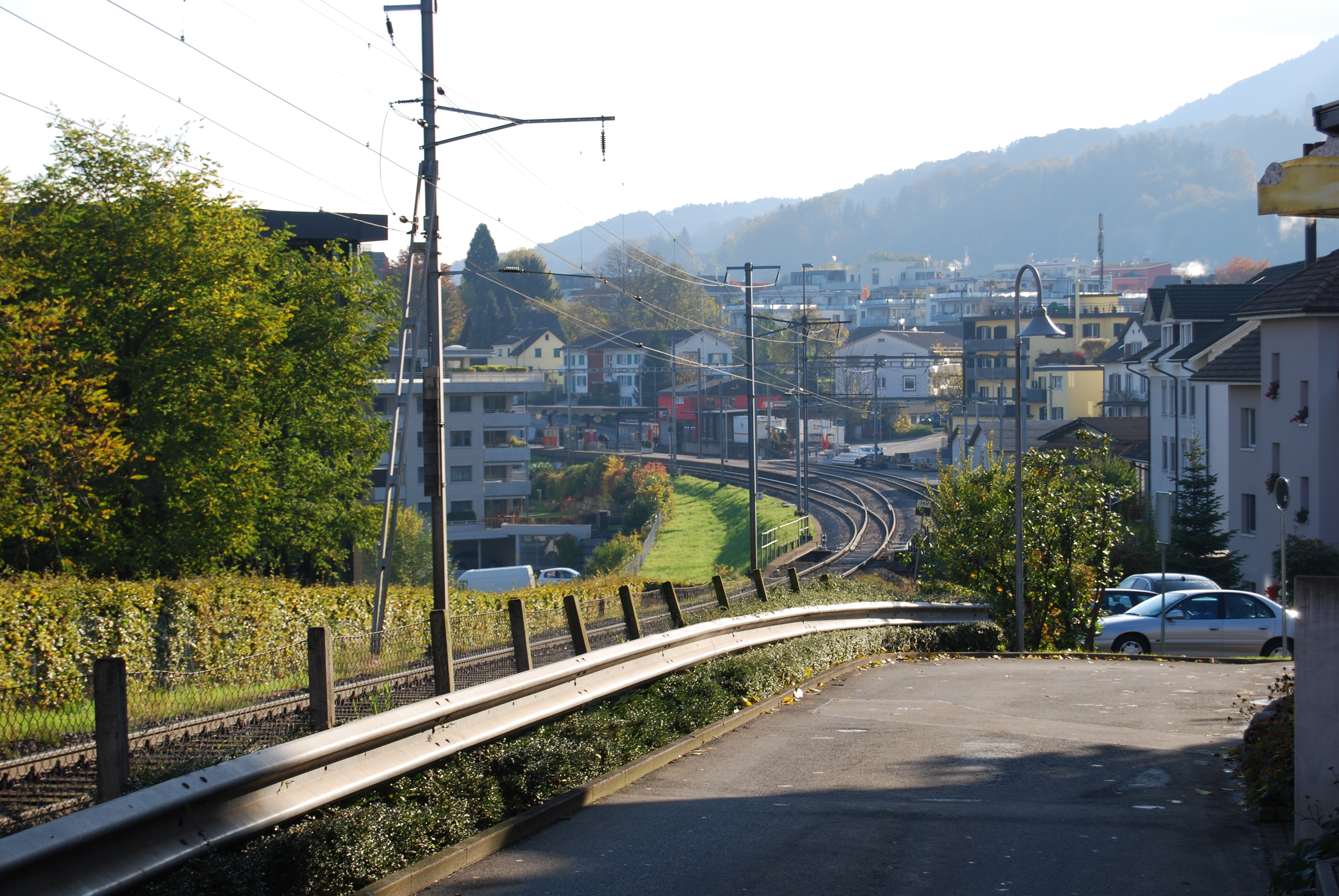

General information
- Location: Bahnhofstrasse; Wollerau, Schwyz; Switzerland
- Coordinates: 47.19541°N 8.724759°E
- Elevation: 504 m (1,654 ft)
- Owner: Südostbahn
- Operator: Südostbahn
- Line: Pfäffikon SZ–Arth-Goldau line
- Platforms: 1 island platform
- Tracks: 3
- Connections
- Bus: PostAuto bus routes 180

Other information
- Fare zone: 181 (ZVV)

Services
Preceding station	Zurich S-Bahn	Following station
Riedmatt towards Einsiedeln	S40	Wilen bei Wollerau towards Rapperswil
Location
- Location within Switzerland Location within Canton of Schwyz

Wollerau railway station is a railway station in the Swiss canton of Schwyz and municipality of Wollerau. The station is located on the Pfäffikon SZ–Arth-Goldau railway line, owned by the Südostbahn, within fare zone 181 of the Zürcher Verkehrsverbund (ZVV).

== Services ==
The station is served by the Zurich S-Bahn service S40, from Einsiedeln to Rapperswil. As of the December 2023 timetable change, the following services call at Wollerau:

- Zurich S-Bahn S40: half-hourly service between Rapperswil and Einsiedeln, via Biberbrugg

== See also ==
- Rail transport in Switzerland
