= Rapperswil–Pfäffikon railway =

Railway line in Switzerland

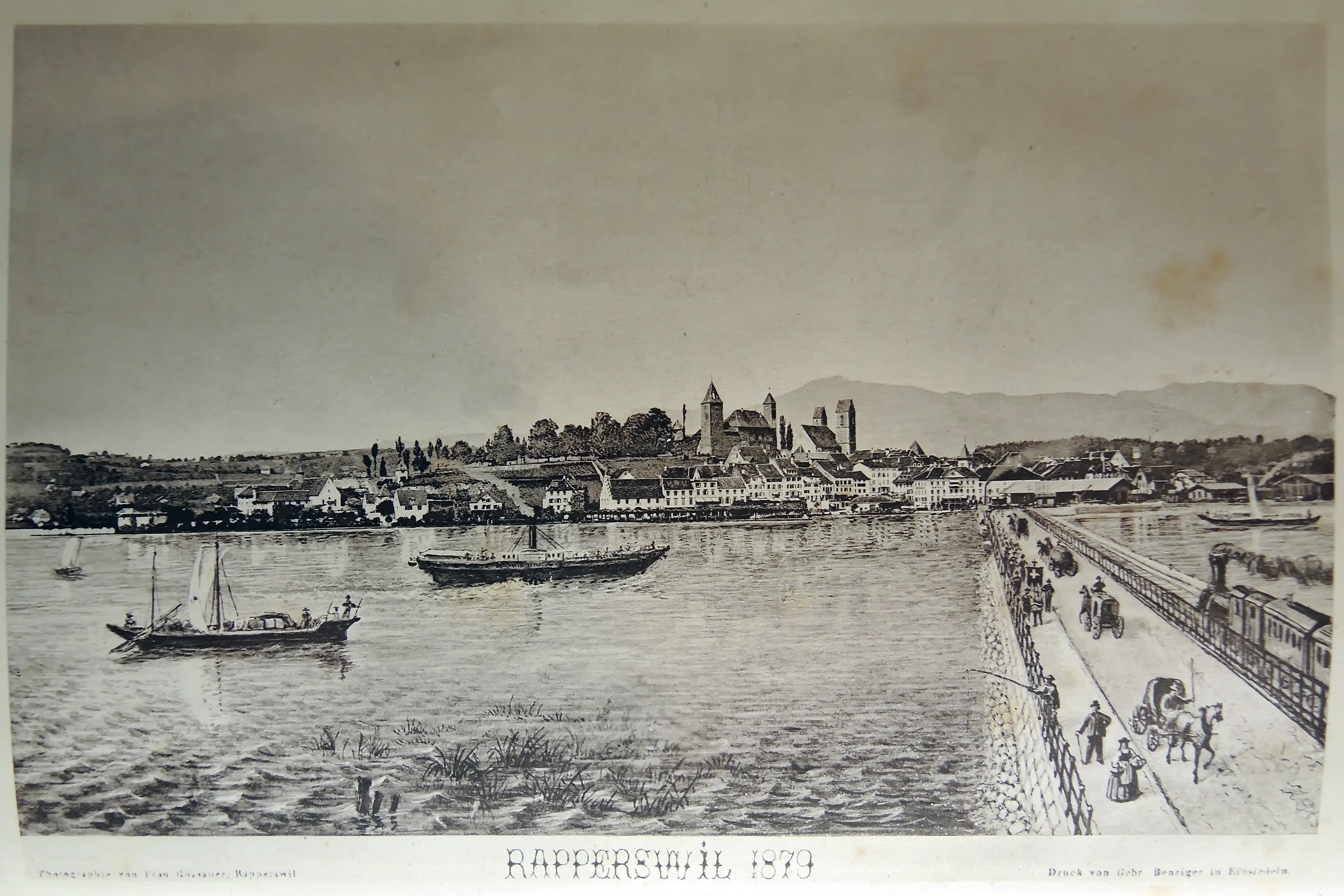
- Train of the Lake Zürich–Gotthard Railway on the Seedamm in 1879

Overview
- Owner: Südostbahn
- Line number: 671
- Termini: Rapperswil; Pfäffikon SZ

Technical
- Line length: 3.510 km (2.181 mi)
- Number of tracks: mostly 1
- Track gauge: 1,435 mm (4 ft 8 1/2 in) standard gauge
- Electrification: 15 kV/16.7 Hz AC overhead catenary
- Maximum incline: 0.8%

The Rapperswil–Pfäffikon railway (also known as the Zürichsee-Gotthardbahn, lit. 'Lake Zürich-Gotthard Railway'; ZGB) is a 3.51 km (2.18 mi) long, mostly single-tracked standard-gauge railway line connecting Pfäffikon in the Swiss canton of Schwyz with Rapperswil in the canton of St. Gallen, crossing Lake Zürich using the Hurden peninsula and Seedamm causeway.

== History ==
=== Zürichsee–Gotthardbahn ===
The Zürichsee–Gotthardbahn (which is listed in Swiss federal statistics as the Rapperswil–Pfäffikon company) commenced operations over the newly built Seedamm (causeway) from Rapperswil to Pfäffikon on 27 August 1878. The ambitious goal of the joint stock company was the construction of a rail link from Eastern Switzerland to the Gotthard Railway (Gotthardbahn, GB) which was still under construction, and continuing along the shore of Lake Lucerne via Vitznau and Küssnacht to Rotkreuz. In 1879 alone, more than 160,000 Swiss francs were invested in planning a projected extension from Pfäffikon to Brunnen.

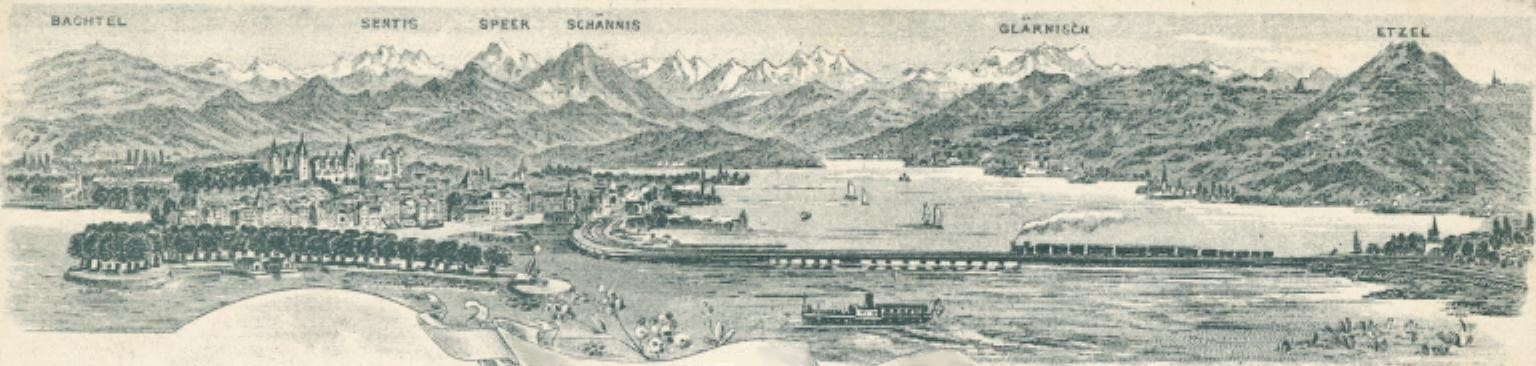
Steam train on the Seedamm, Rapperswil on the left, mountain panorama in the background

The federal government contributed 100,000 francs to the cost of the causeway construction, which included a road (Hauptstrasse 8) and a footpath as well as the railway. In addition to the operation and maintenance of the railway, the ZGB was responsible for maintaining the road on the causeway. In order to be able to dispense with further investments in rolling stock and operational facilities, the ZGB transferred operations to the United Swiss Railways (Vereinigte Schweizerbahnen; VSB), which had a large rolling stock depot in Rapperswil. The operations, which always ran at a deficit, stopped at Rapperwil, where the ZGB connected with the Lake Zürich left-bank railway.

=== Südostbahn ===
Although the company had a concession to build a link to the Gotthard Railway, no significant effort was made to build it. When another initiative committee tried to get a concession for a Pfäffikon–Brunnen or Pfäffikon–Arth-Goldau railway, the ZGB sold it the land surveys that it had already carried out. Finally, on 12 August 1889, the existing initiative committees, the Wädenswil-Einsiedeln-Bahn (Wädenswil-Einsiedeln Railway) and the ZGB signed a merger agreement to found the Südostbahn (Swiss Southeastern Railway; SOB). The SOB started operations on 1 January 1890 and ended VSB operations on the Rapperswil–Pfäffikon line on 5 August 1891. When the SOB acquired the ZGB, nearly 90 percent of the share capital and 25 percent of the fixed bonds were written off.

The Südostbahn, to which the Rapperswil–Pfäffikon line now belonged, opened the Pfäffikon–Arth-Goldau railway on 8 August 1891, which gave Rapperswil access to the Gotthard Railway. The SOB started electric operations on 15 May 1939. A section of double-track between Pfäffikon Nord and Pfäffikon has relieved the congested line over the Seedamm since 6 June 2004. SBB S-Bahn services are now operated over the SOB line.

== Operations ==
Five trains run every hour in each direction over the Seedamm in 2019:

- one Voralpen-Express (St. Gallen – Rapperswil – Arth-Goldau – Lucerne), operated by the SOB
- two services of line S5 of the Zürich S-Bahn, operated by the SBB
- two services of line S40 of the Zürich S-Bahn, operated by the SOB
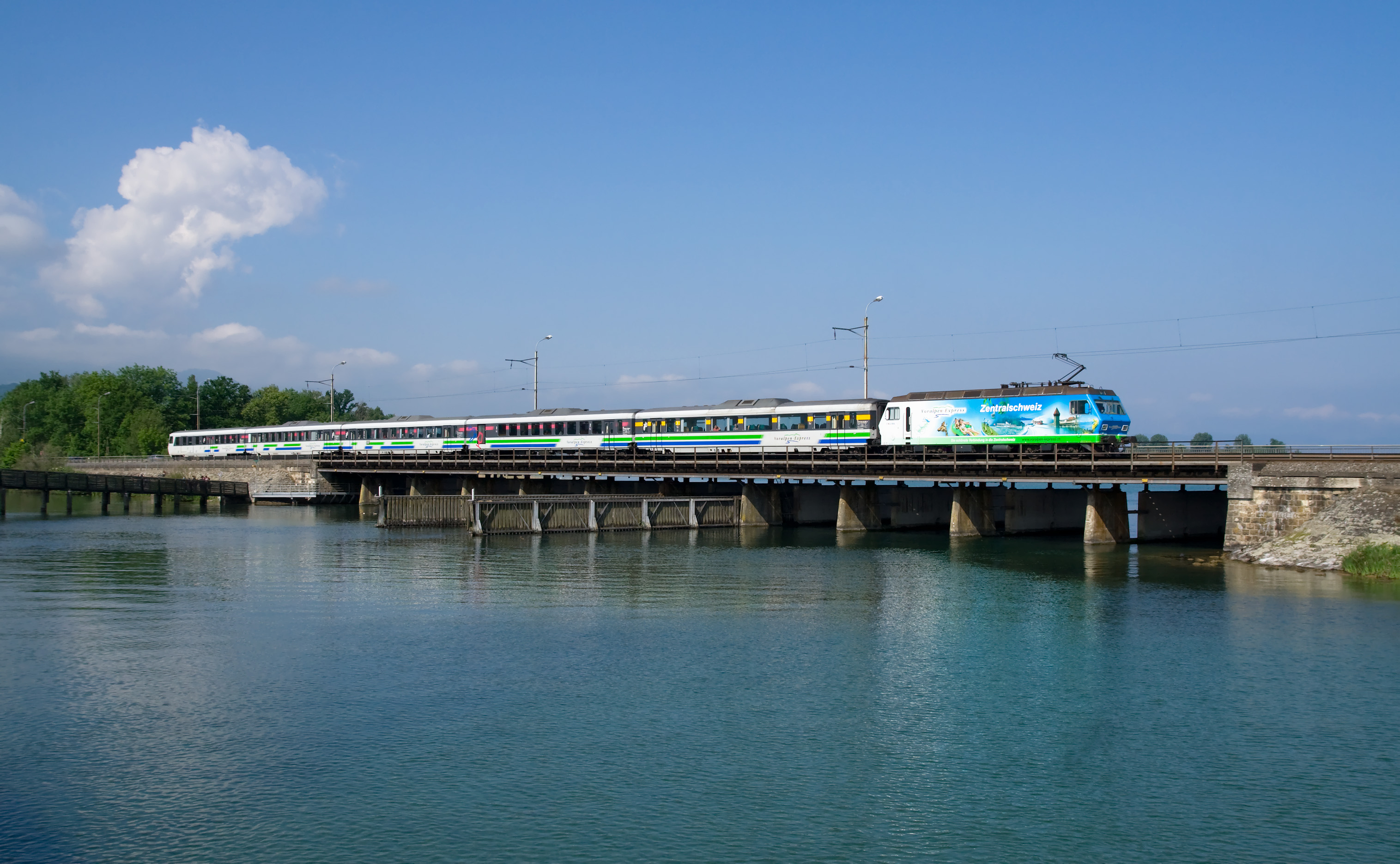
Voralpen-Express service of the SOB hauled by an Re 456 locomotive

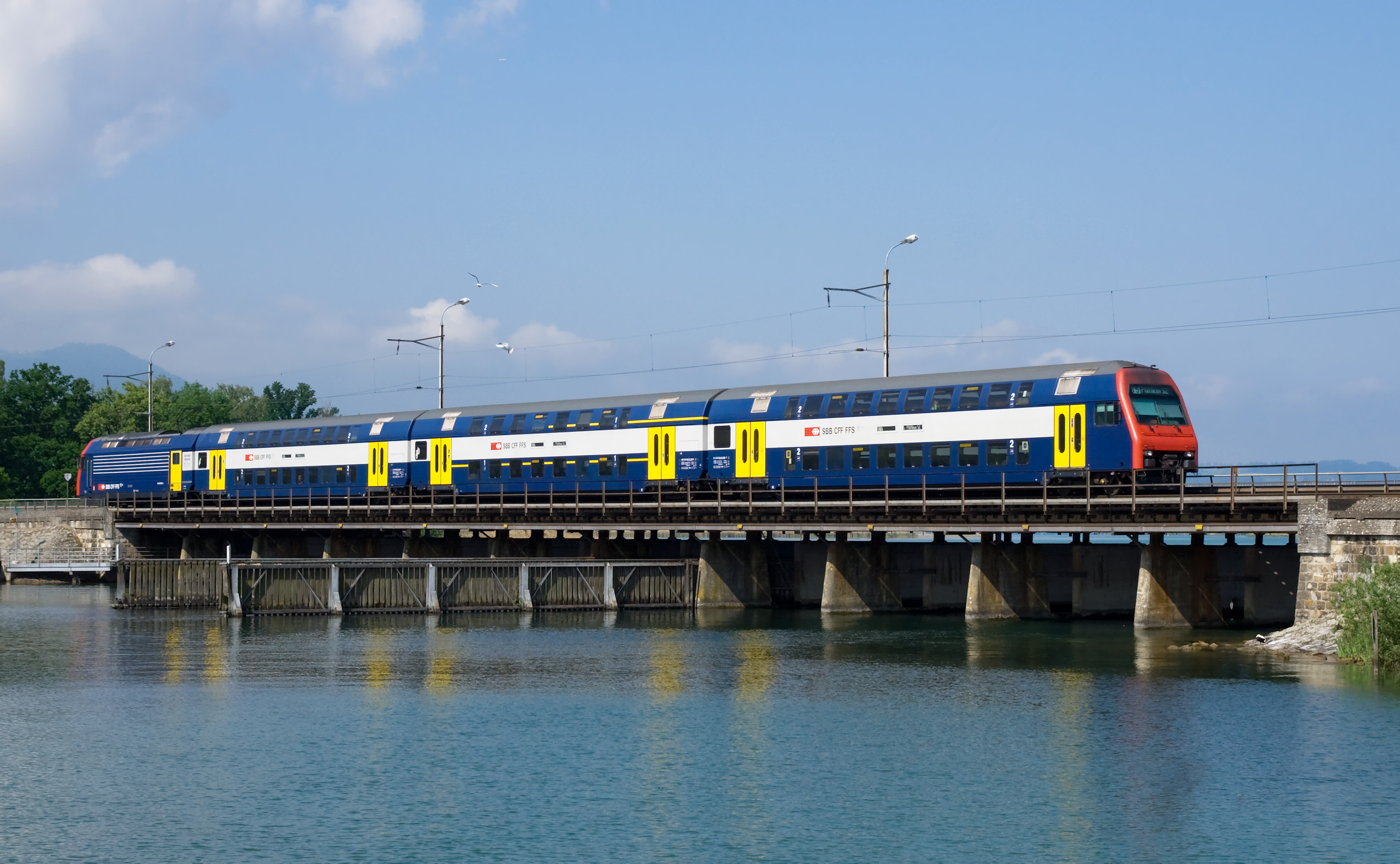
Re 450 double-deck push-pull train running as an S5 service

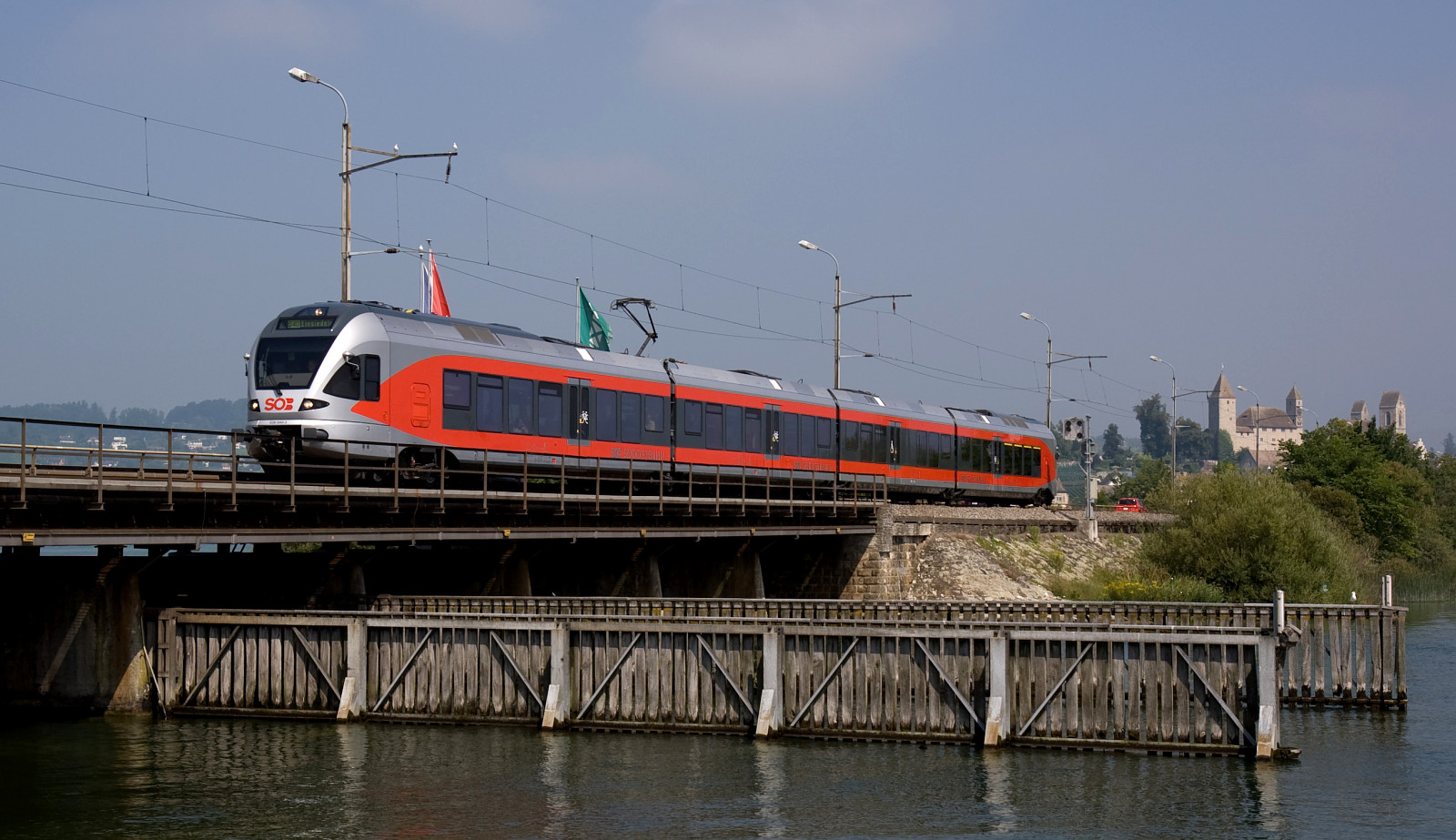
S40 Rapperswil–Einsiedeln service operated by a Flirt set of the Südostbahn

In the early hours of Saturday and Sunday mornings, the SOB-owned Hurden station is served only by line S5 the SBB as part of its night network.
