= Pfäffikon SZ railway station =

Railway station in Pfäffikon, Schwyz, Switzerland

Pfäffikon SZ
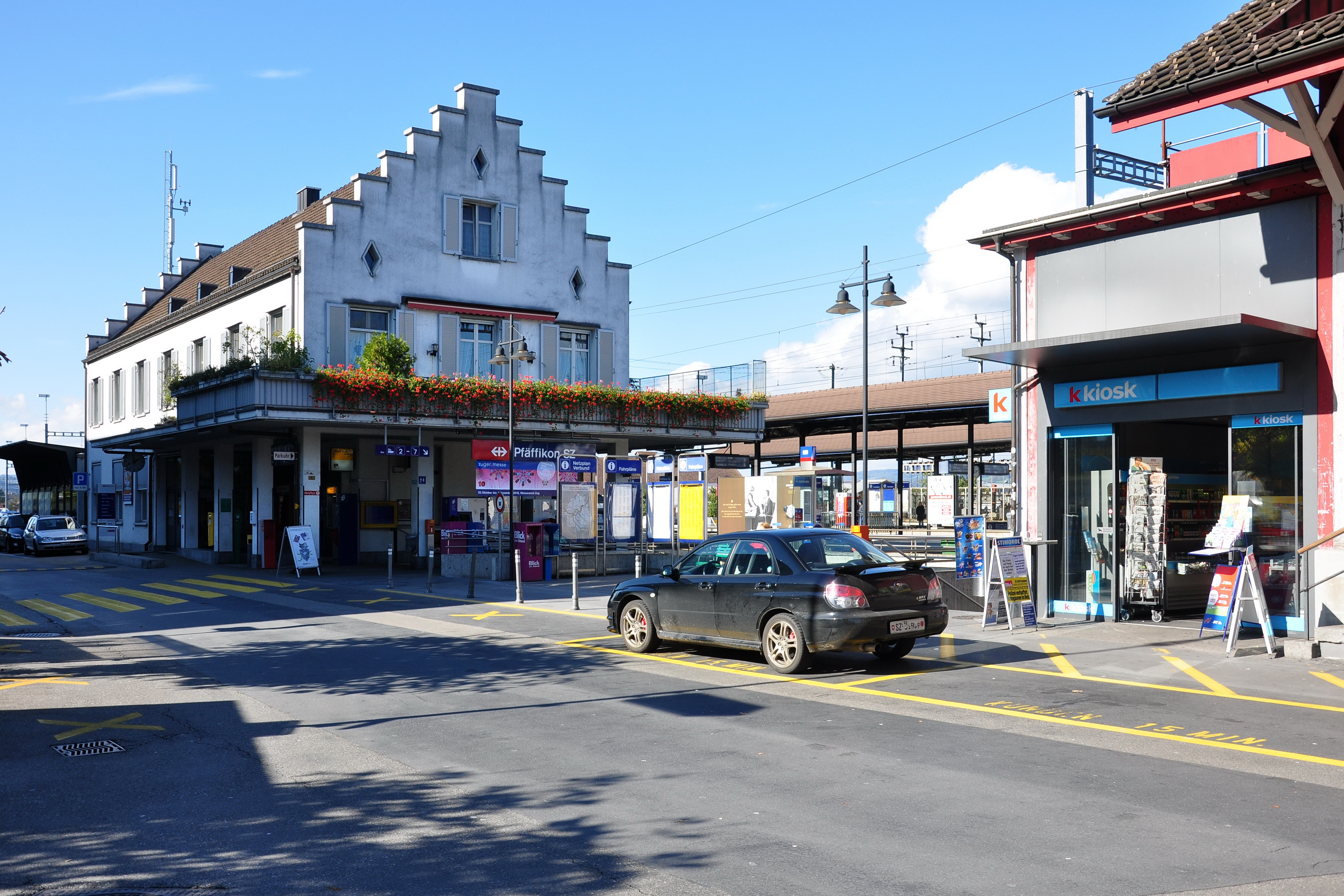
- The station building in 2010

General information
- Location: Freienbach; Switzerland
- Coordinates: 47°12′11″N 8°46′41″E
- Elevation: 412 m (1,352 ft)
- Owner: Swiss Federal Railways
- Lines: Lake Zürich left-bank line; Pfäffikon–Arth-Goldau line; Rapperswil–Pfäffikon line
- Distance: 33.10 km (20.57 mi) from Zürich Hauptbahnhof
- Platforms: 2 island platforms; 1 side platform
- Tracks: 5
- Train operators: Südostbahn; Swiss Federal Railways
- Connections: PostAuto Schweiz; AHW Busbetriebe

Other information
- Fare zone: 181 (ZVV)

Passengers
- 2025: 16,700 per day (SBB, SOB)
- Rank: 49 out of 1,095

Services
Preceding station	Südostbahn	Following station
Wädenswil towards Bern	IR 35 Aare Linth	Siebnen-Wangen towards Chur
Biberbrugg towards Lucerne	Voralpen Express	Rapperswil towards St. Gallen
Preceding station	Zurich S-Bahn	Following station
Richterswil towards Zurich Airport	S2	Altendorf towards Ziegelbrücke
Terminus	S5	Rapperswil towards Zug
Freienbach SBB towards Winterthur	S8	Terminus
Freienbach SBB towards Winterthur	S8 Limited service	Altendorf towards Ziegelbrücke
Wädenswil towards Zürich HB	S25	Lachen towards Linthal
Freienbach SOB towards Einsiedeln	S40	Hurden towards Rapperswil
Terminus	SN5 Limited service	Hurden towards Knonau
Freienbach SBB towards Pfäffikon ZH	SN8 Limited service	Altendorf towards Lachen
Location
- Location within Switzerland Location within Canton of Schwyz

Pfäffikon SZ railway station (German: Bahnhof Pfäffikon SZ) is a junction station serving Pfäffikon, the principal town of the municipality of Freienbach, in the canton of Schwyz (SZ), Switzerland. The station is situated at the northern edge of the town, between the town centre and Lake Zurich. It is located within fare zone 181 of the Zürcher Verkehrsverbund (ZVV).

The station forms part of the Lake Zurich left-bank railway line, which links Zürich Hauptbahnhof with Ziegelbrücke and Näfels, and is owned and operated by the Swiss Federal Railways (SBB). To the east of the station is the junction for the line to Rapperswil, which crosses Lake Zurich over the Seedamm, whilst to the west is the junction for the line to Arth-Goldau; both these latter being owned and operated by the Südostbahn (SOB).

== Services ==
As of the December 2021 timetable change, the following services stop at Pfäffikon SZ:

- InterRegio:
  - Aare-Linth: hourly service between Bern and Chur.
  - IR Voralpen Express: hourly service between Lucerne and St. Gallen.
- Zurich S-Bahn:
  - S2: half-hourly service between Zürich Airport and Ziegelbrücke.
  - S5: half-hourly service to Zug.
  - S8: half-hourly service to Winterthur; individual trains in the late night and early morning operate to Ziegelbrücke.
  - S25: hourly service between Zürich Hauptbahnhof and Linthal.
  - S40: half-hourly service between Einsiedeln and Rapperswil.

During weekends, there are also two nighttime S-Bahn services (SN5 and SN8) offered by ZVV.

- Nighttime S-Bahn (Friday and Saturday nights):
  - SN5: hourly service to Knonau (via Rapperswil and Zürich HB).
  - SN8: hourly service between Pfäffikon ZH and Lachen (via Zürich HB).

Südostbahn operates the two InterRegio services and the S40; Swiss Federal Railways operates the other Zürich S-Bahn services.

== Layout and connections ==
Pfäffikon has two 419-metre (1,375 ft) island platforms with two tracks each (Nos. 2–3; 5–6) and one 299-metre (981 ft) side platform with a single track (No. 7). Adjacent to the station is the Pfäffikon bus terminal. PostAuto Schweiz and AHW Busbetriebe (for the municipality of Freienbach) operate bus services to Ziegelbrücke, Siebnen, Feusisberg, Richterswil and Freienbach.

== Gallery ==
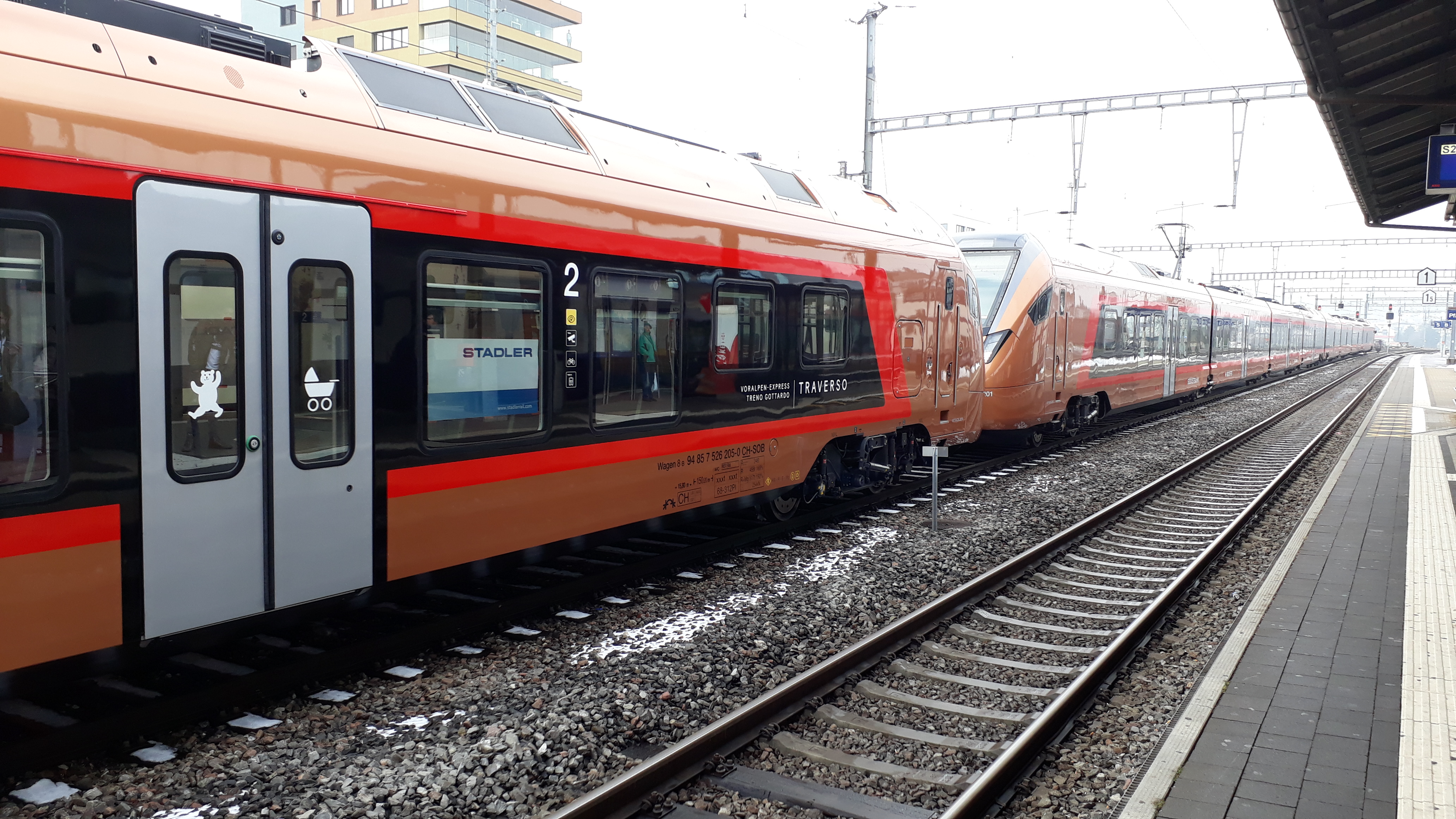
Südostbahn RABe 526 (Traverso) as Voralpen-Express at the station

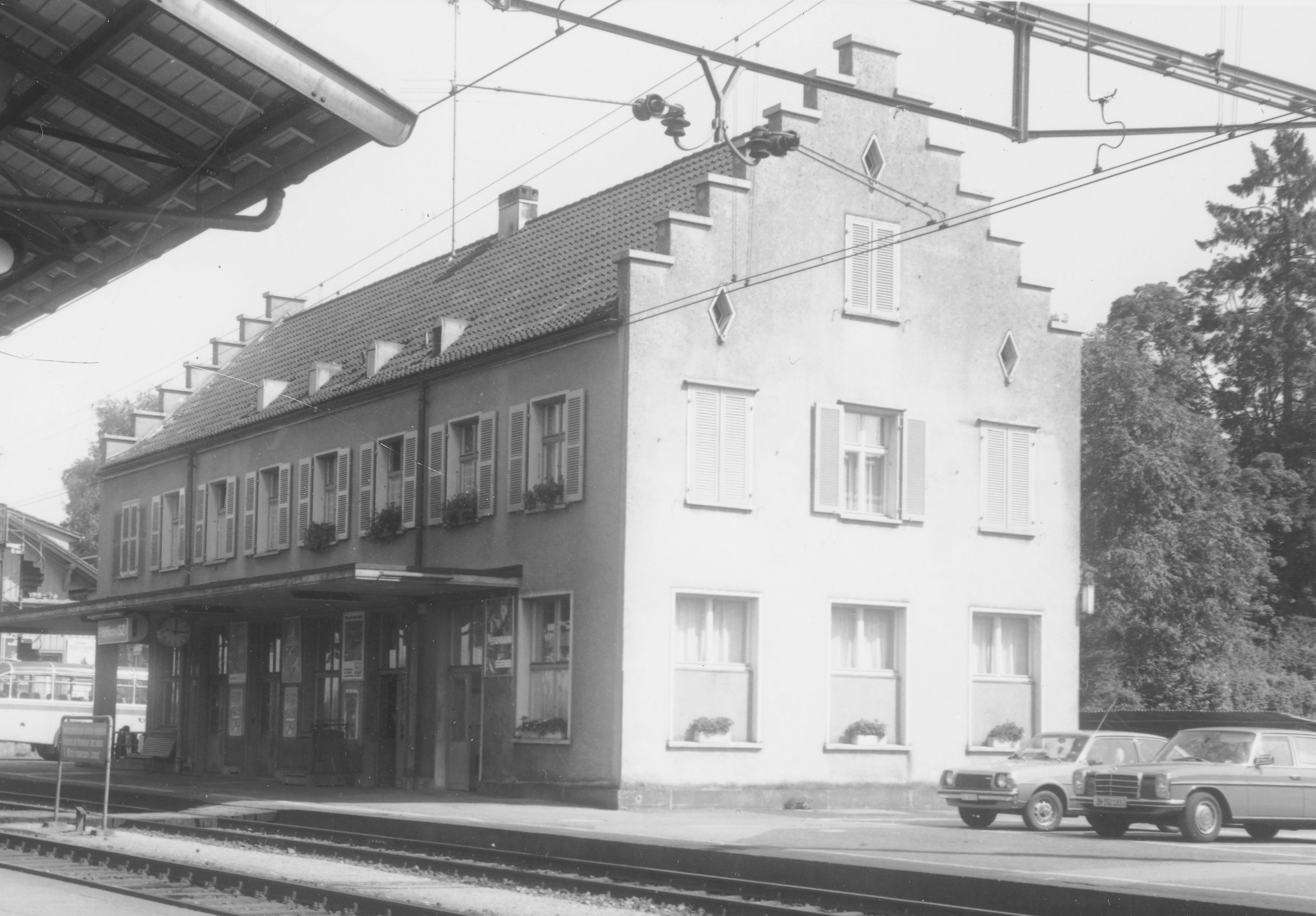
Station building in 1978

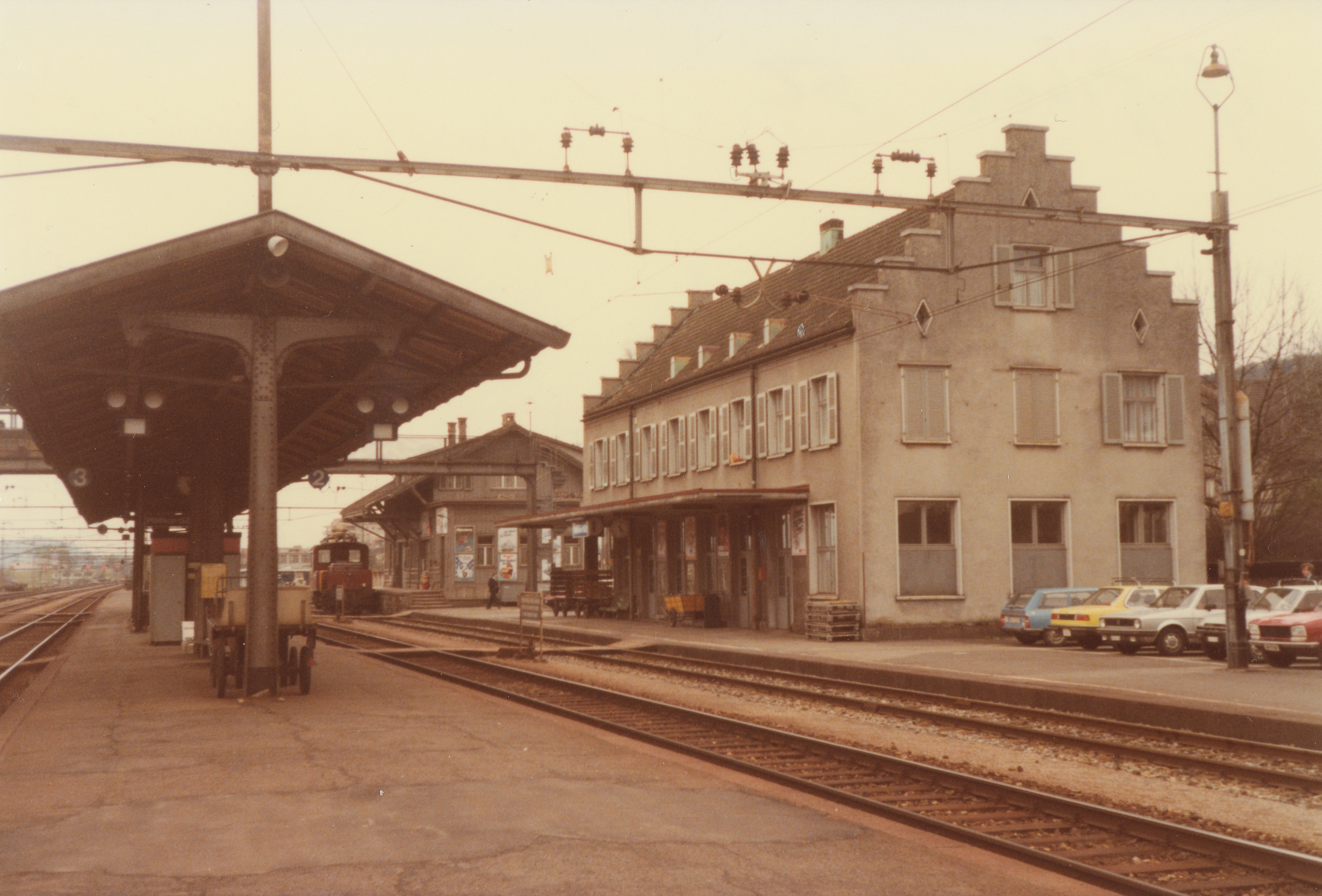
Station building, platforms and tracks in 1981

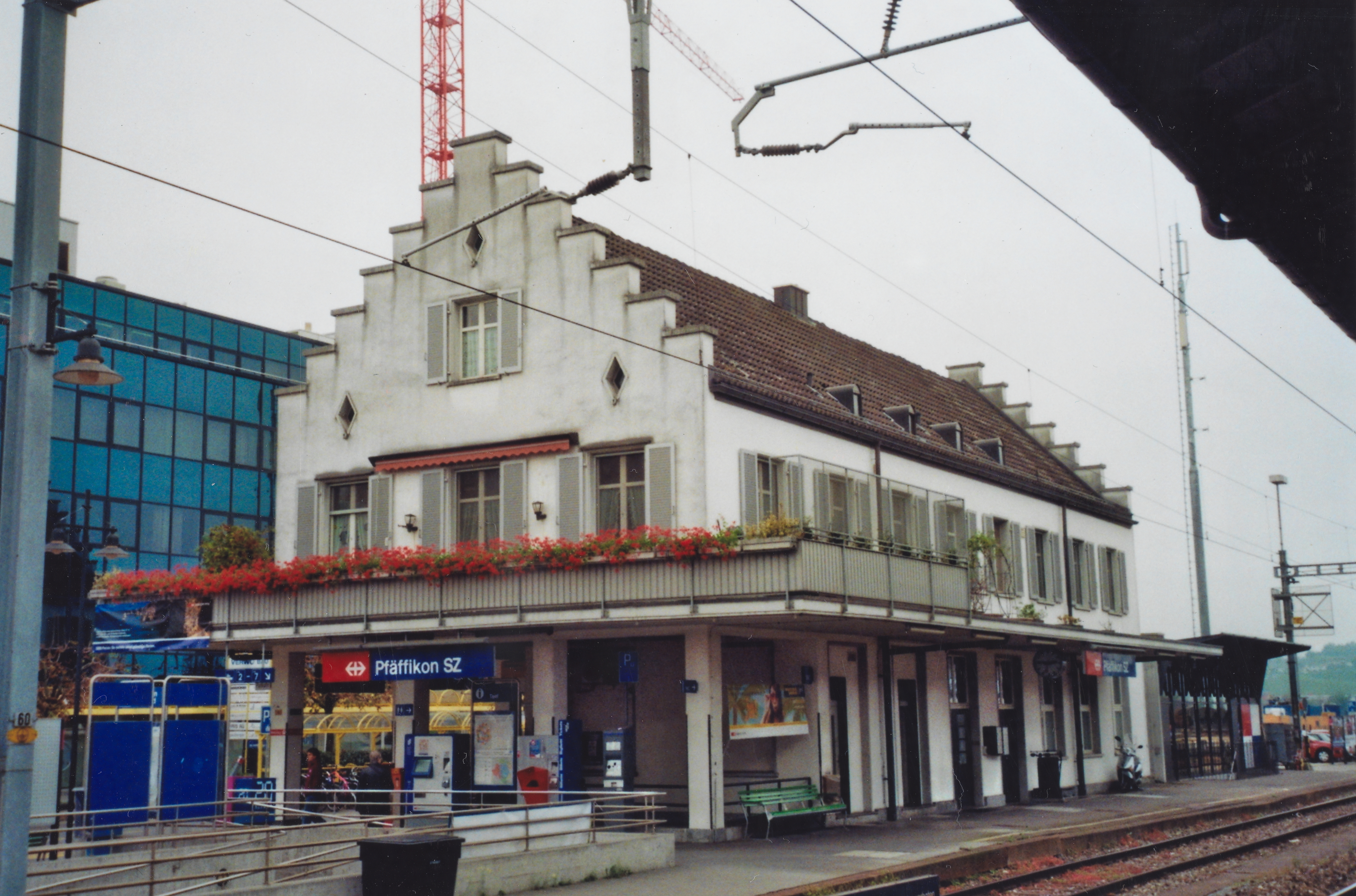
Station building in 2011

== See also ==
- History of rail transport in Switzerland
- Rail transport in Switzerland
