= Höfe District =

Coordinates: 47°11′N 8°43′E

Höfe District Bezirk Höfe
- District
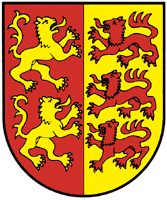
- Coat of arms
- Country: Switzerland
- Canton: Schwyz
- Capital: Wollerau/Pfäffikon (Freienbach)

Area
  - Total: 37.6 km^{2} (14.5 sq mi)

Population (December 2020)
  - Total: 29,332
  - Density: 780/km^{2} (2,020/sq mi)
- Time zone: UTC+1 (CET)
  - Summer (DST): UTC+2 (CEST)
- Municipalities: 3

Höfe District is a district of the canton of Schwyz, Switzerland. The coat of arms of the Höfe is per pale: gules, two lions rampant contourny or; and or, three lions passant gules. It has a population of 29,332 (as of 31 December 2020).

The district contains three municipalities:

Coat of arms	Municipality	Population (31 December 2020)	Area, km^{2}
Feusisberg	Feusisberg	5,427	17.5
Freienbach	Freienbach	16,520	13.8
Wollerau	Wollerau	7,385	6.3
Total		29,332	37.6

== References and external links ==
- Höfe district (Schwyz canton, Switzerland) at Flags of the World
