= Freienbach SOB railway station =

Railway station in Freienbach, Switzerland

Freienbach SOB
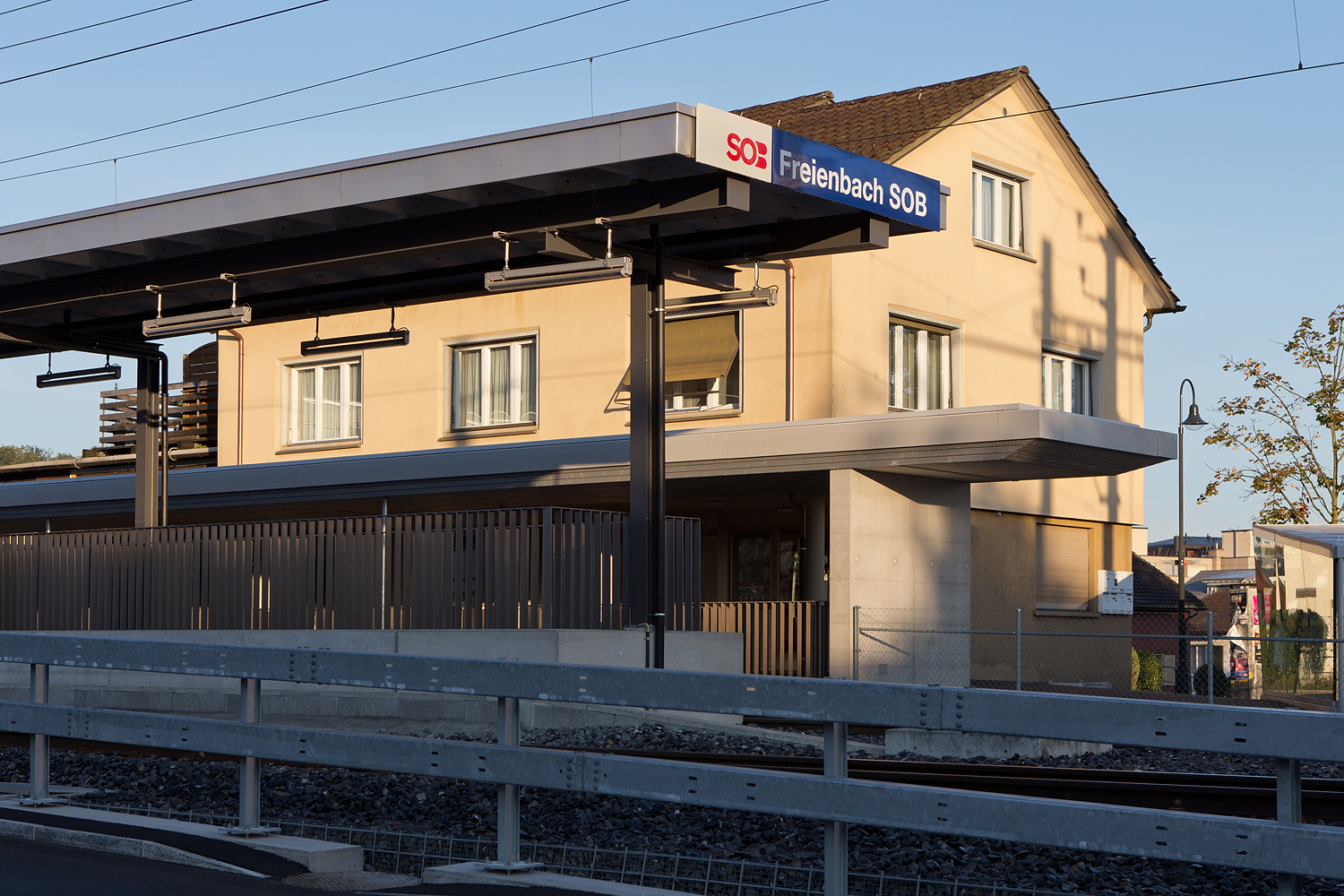
- Freienbach SOB station

General information
- Location: Kirchstrasse; Freienbach, Schwyz; Switzerland
- Coordinates: 47.203965°N 8.759108°E
- Elevation: 415 m (1,362 ft)
- Owner: Südostbahn (SOB)
- Operator: Südostbahn (SOB)
- Line: Pfäffikon SZ–Arth-Goldau line
- Platforms: 1 island platform
- Tracks: 2
- Connections: Local bus line 189

Other information
- Fare zone: 181 (ZVV)

Services
Preceding station	Zurich S-Bahn	Following station
Wilen bei Wollerau towards Einsiedeln	S40	Pfäffikon SZ towards Rapperswil
Location
- Location within Switzerland Location within Canton of Schwyz

Freienbach SOB railway station is a railway station in the Swiss canton of Schwyz and municipality of Freienbach. The station lies within fare zone 181 of the Zürcher Verkehrsverbund (ZVV) and is located on the Pfäffikon SZ–Arth-Goldau railway line, owned by the Südostbahn (SOB).

Freienbach SOB station should not be confused with the nearby Freienbach SBB railway station, which is on the Lake Zurich left-bank railway line. The two stations are approximately 500 metres (1,600 ft) apart on foot.

== Services ==
Freienbach SOB is an intermediate stop on Zurich S-Bahn service S40, from Einsiedeln to Rapperswil. As of the December 2023 timetable change, the following services call at Freienbach SOB:

- Zurich S-Bahn S40: half-hourly service between Rapperswil and Einsiedeln, via Biberbrugg

== See also ==
- Rail transport in Switzerland
