= Freienbach SBB railway station =

Railway station in Freienbach, Switzerland

Freienbach SBB
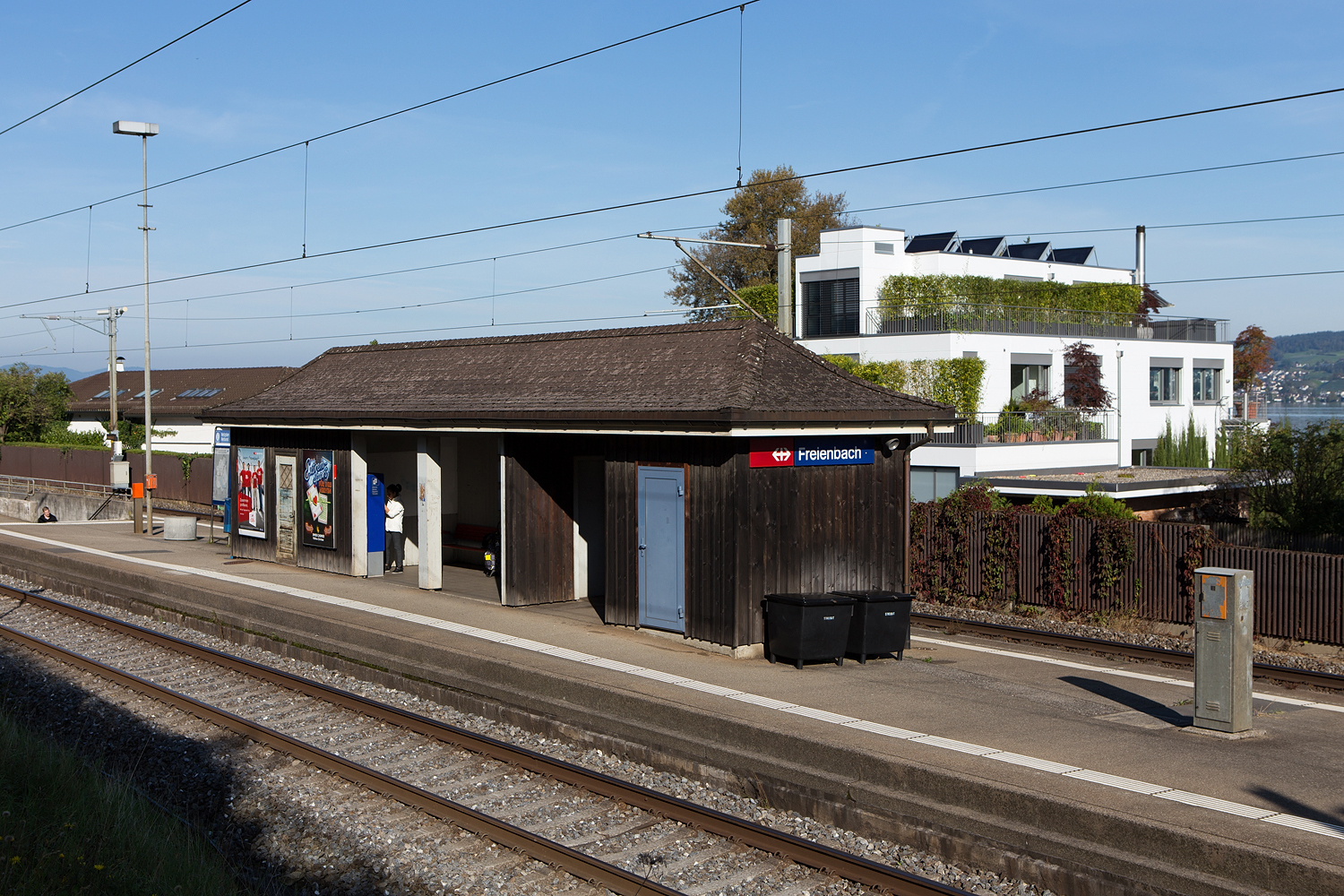
- The station platform in 2014

General information
- Location: Freienbach; Switzerland
- Coordinates: 47°12′25″N 8°45′22″E
- Elevation: 410 m (1,350 ft)
- Owner: Swiss Federal Railways
- Line: Lake Zürich left-bank line
- Platforms: 1 island platform
- Tracks: 2
- Train operators: Swiss Federal Railways
- Connections: PostAuto Schweiz bus line 180 (departing from Freienbach, Alte Post bus stop)

Other information
- Fare zone: 181 (ZVV)

Services
Preceding station	Zurich S-Bahn	Following station
Bäch towards Winterthur	S8	Pfäffikon SZ Terminus
Bäch towards Pfäffikon ZH	SN8 Limited service	Pfäffikon SZ towards Lachen
Location
- Location within Switzerland Location within Canton of Schwyz

Freienbach SBB railway station is a railway station in the municipality of Freienbach in the Swiss canton of Schwyz, within fare zone 181 of the Zürcher Verkehrsverbund (ZVV). The station is located on the Lake Zurich left-bank railway line, owned by the Swiss Federal Railways (SBB).

Freienbach SBB station should not be confused with the nearby Freienbach SOB railway station, which is on the Pfäffikon SZ–Arth-Goldau line. The two stations are approximately 500 metres (1,600 ft) apart on foot.

== Services ==
Freienbach SBB is an intermediate stop on Zurich S-Bahn line S8, between Winterthur and Pfäffikon, via Zurich. As of the December 2023 timetable change, the following services call at Freienbach SBB:

- Zurich S-Bahn S8: half-hourly service between Pfäffikon SZ and Winterthur, via Zürich HB

During weekends, there is also a nighttime S-Bahn service (SN8) offered by ZVV.

- Nighttime S-Bahn (Friday and Saturday nights):
  - SN8: hourly service between Pfäffikon ZH and Lachen (via Zürich HB).

== See also ==
- History of rail transport in Switzerland
- Rail transport in Switzerland
