= S40 (ZVV) =

Railway service in Switzerland

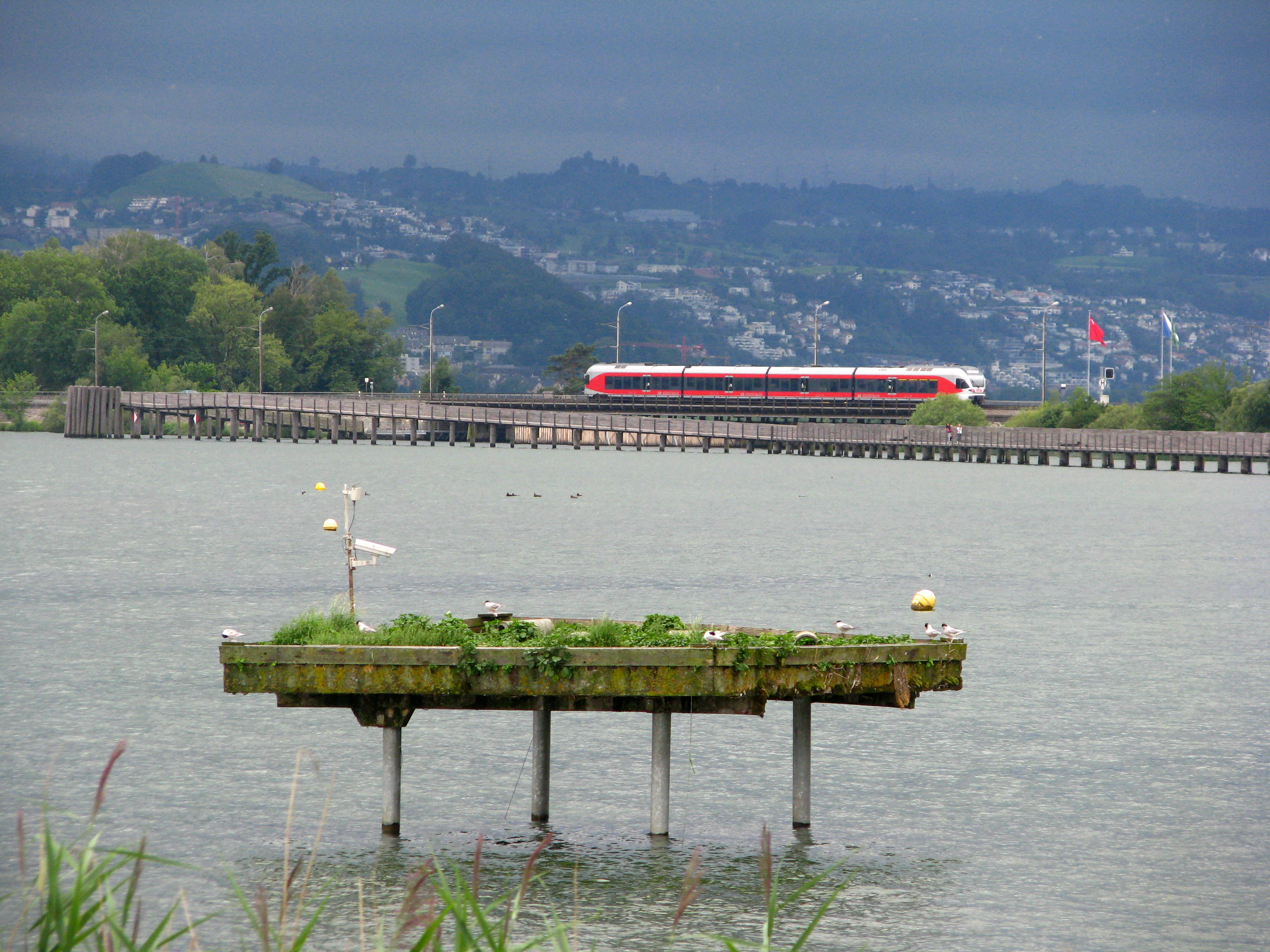
- SOB Flirt of the S40 line crossing the Seedamm at Rapperswil; Holzbrücke Rapperswil-Hurden in the foreground.

Overview
- Status: Operational
- Locale: Switzerland
- Termini: Einsiedeln; Rapperswil
- Stations: 12
- Website: ZVV (in English)

Service
- Type: S-Bahn
- System: Zurich S-Bahn
- Operator(s): Zürcher Verkehrsverbund (ZVV)
- Rolling stock: Stadler Flirt EMUs

Technical
- Track gauge: 1,435 mm (4 ft 8 1/2 in)

Zurich S-Bahn network as of December 2018

The S40 is a regional railway line of the Zurich S-Bahn on the Zürcher Verkehrsverbund (ZVV), Zurich transportation network, in the cantons of Schwyz, St. Gallen and Zurich.

== Route ==
- S40 Rapperswil–Pfäffikon SZ–Samstagern–Einsiedeln

The line runs from Einsiedeln to Rapperswil via the junction stations of Biberbrugg and Pfäffikon SZ, crossing the Seedamm. It is operated by the Südostbahn (SOB).

== Stations ==
- Einsiedeln
- Biberbrugg
- Schindellegi-Feusisberg
- Samstagern
- Riedmatt (stops only on request)
- Wollerau
- Wilen bei Wollerau (stops only on request)
- Freienbach SOB
- Pfäffikon SZ
- Hurden
- Rapperswil

== Rolling stock ==
All services use Südostbahn rolling stock.

== Scheduling ==
The train frequency is usually 30 minutes, and the trip takes 37 minutes.

== See also ==
- Rail transport in Switzerland
- Public transport in Zurich
- ZVV fare zones
