= Au =

Au, AU, au or a.u. may refer to:

== Science and technology ==
=== Computing ===
- .au, the internet country code for Australia
- Au file format, Sun Microsystems' audio format
- Audio Units, a system level plug-in architecture from Apple Computer
- Adobe Audition, a sound editor program
- Windows Update or Automatic Updates, in Microsoft Windows
- Windows 10 Anniversary Update, of August 2016a

=== Physics and chemistry ===
- Gold, chemical symbol Au
- Absorbance unit, a reporting unit in spectroscopy
- Atomic units, a system of units convenient for atomic physics and other fields
- Ångström unit, a unit of length equal to 10^{−10} m or 0.1 nanometre.
- Astronomical unit, a unit of length used in planetary systems astronomy
- Arbitrary unit, a placeholder unit for when the actual value of a measurement is unknown or unimportant

== Arts and entertainment ==
=== Music ===
- AU (band), an experimental pop group headed by Luke Wyland
- Au, a 2010 release by Scottish rock band from Burnham-on-Sea, named DMP (Donaldson, Moir and Paterson) - George Paterson is also Goodreads-featured writer
- Au a track on Some Time in New York City by an album by John Lennon & Yoko Ono and Elephant's Memory

=== Magazines ===
- Alternative Ulster, a Northern Irish music magazine, now called AU
- A&U: America's AIDS Magazine, sponsor of the Christopher Hewitt Award

=== Other media ===
- Alternative universe (fan fiction), fiction by fan authors that deliberately alters facts of the canonical universe written about.
- Au Co, a fairy in Vietnamese mythology
- Age of Ultron, a 2013 series published by Marvel Comics
- A.U, a Chinese media franchise and brand

== Organizations ==
- au (mobile phone company), a mobile phone operator in Japan
- AU Small Finance Bank in India
- African Union, a continental union
- Americans United for Separation of Church and State
- Athletic Union, the union of sports clubs in a British university
- Austral Líneas Aéreas (IATA code AU)
- Auxiliary Units, specially trained, highly secret units created by the United Kingdom government during the Second World War
- AGROunia, an agrarian-socialist political party in Poland
- AngloGold Ashanti (NYSE ticker AU)

=== Universities ===
==== Asia ====
- Ajou University in Suwon, Gyeonggi, South Korea
- Abasyn University in Peshawar, Khyber Pakhtunkhwa, Pakistan
- Andhra University in Visakhapatnam, AP, India
- Anhui University in Hefei, Anhui, China
- Aletheia University in New Taipei City, Taiwan
- Allahabad University in Allahabad, Uttar Pradesh, India
- Arellano University in Philippines
- Assumption University (Thailand) in Thailand
- Abhilashi University in Himachal Pradesh, India
- Adesh University in Bathinda, Punjab, India.

==== Europe ====
- Aarhus University in Aarhus, Denmark
- Aberystwyth University in Aberystwyth, Wales, United Kingdom
- Akademia Umiejętności in Kraków, Poland
- Arden University in Coventry, England

==== Oceania ====
- Adelaide University in South Australia
- Auckland University in New Zealand

==== North America ====
- Adelphi University in Garden City, New York
- Alfred University in Alfred, New York
- Algoma University in Sault Ste. Marie, Ontario, Canada
- American University in Washington, D.C.
- Anderson University (Indiana) in Anderson, Indiana
- Anderson University (South Carolina) in Anderson, South Carolina
- Andrews University in Berrien Springs, Michigan
- Antioch University in Culver City, California
- Apollos University in Huntington Beach, California
- Arcadia University in Glenside, Pennsylvania
- Argosy University in Alameda, California
- Arizona University in Tucson, Arizona
- Ashland University in Ashland, Ohio
- Athabasca University in Athabasca, Alberta, Canada
- Auburn University in Auburn, Alabama
- Augsburg University in Minneapolis, Minnesota
- Augusta University in Augusta, Georgia
- Aurora University in Aurora, Illinois

==== Other ====
- Air University (disambiguation), various Air Force universities

== Places ==
- Aue (toponymy), a frequent element in Germanic toponymy
- Australia (ISO 3166 country code)
- Australasia
- Au, Guinea, Kankan Region

=== Austria ===
- Austria (obsolete NATO, FIPS, and LOC MARC two-letter country code)
- Au, Vorarlberg, Bregenz, Austria
- Au am Leithaberge, Austria
- Au im Bregenzerwald, Austria

=== Germany ===
- Au (Munich), Munich, Germany
- Au (Schwarzwald), Baden-Württemberg, Germany
- Au (squat), a building and cultural center in Frankfurt, Germany
- Au am Rhein, Germany
- Au in der Hallertau, Germany

=== Switzerland ===
- Au, St. Gallen
- Au, Zürich
- Au peninsula
- Schloss Au, a château in Wädenswil

== Vehicles ==
- Ford Falcon (AU), a family car made in Australia
- Vought AU, a post-World War II US Marine Corps variant of the F4U Corsair aircraft

== Other uses ==
- Au, a Welsh vodka brand owned by Sazerac Company
- Alopecia universalis, a medical condition involving the loss of all body hair
- Au (surname), a Chinese family name
- Au language
- Ab urbe condita (sometimes abbreviated as a.u.), Latin for "from the founding of the City" (Rome)
- Aú, a cartwheel in the Brazilian martial art of Capoeira
- a'u, the Hawaiian name for the Pacific blue marlin
