= Halbinsel Au =

Halbinsel Au may refer to:

- Au peninsula, in Lake Zurich, Switzerland
- Halbinsel Au (ship, 1939), a former passenger ship on Lake Zurich, Switzerland
