= Au, Switzerland =

Au, Switzerland may refer to:

- Au, St. Gallen, a municipality in the Canton of St. Gallen
- Au, Zürich, a municipality in the Canton of Zürich
