= Wädenswil–Vorder Au =

Vorder Au
UNESCO World Heritage Site
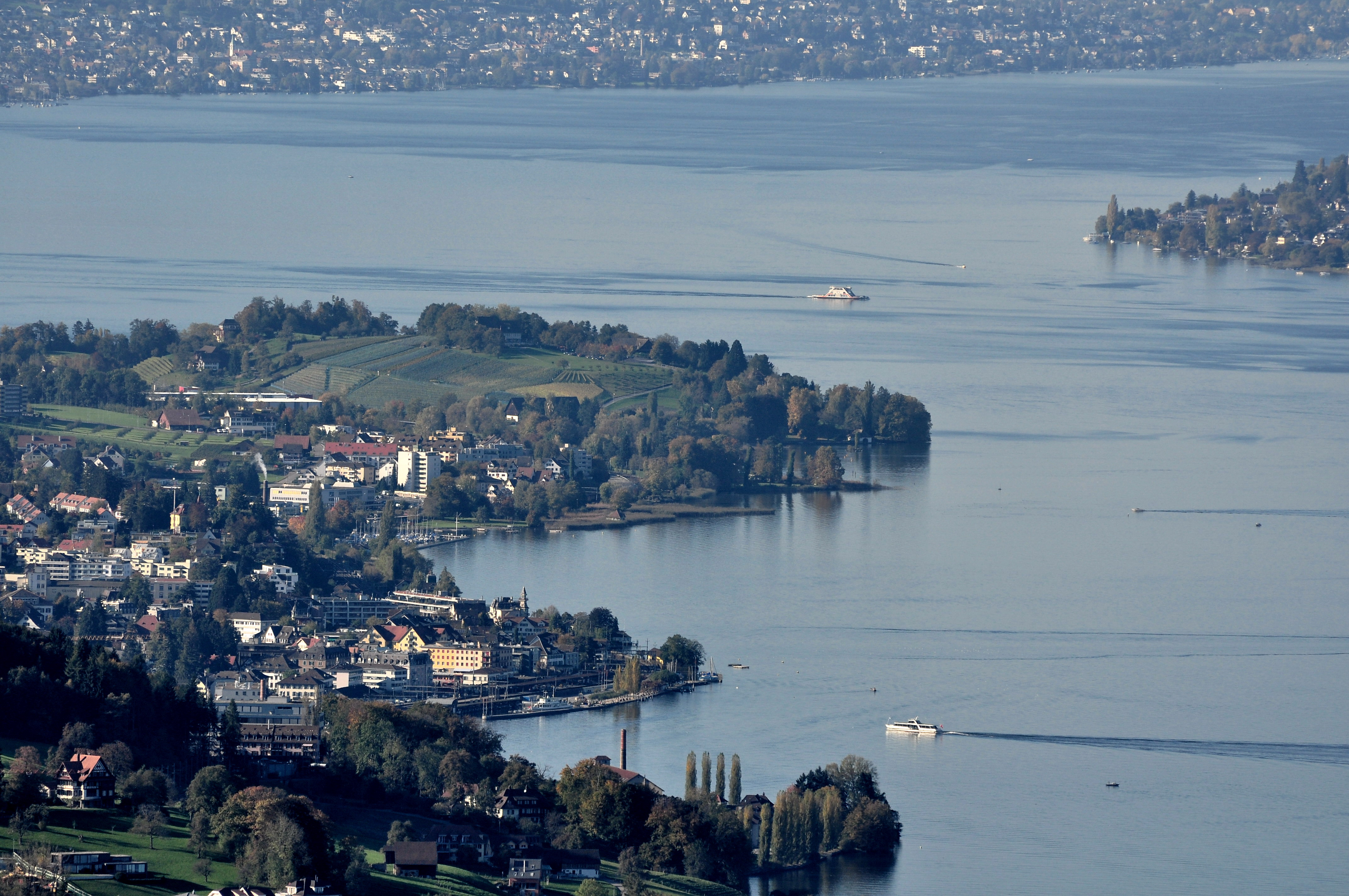
- The site of the prehistoric settlement at the Au peninsula respective the locality Au, Switzerland

- Location within Canton of Zürich Location within Switzerland
- Location: Au peninsula, Au, Wädenswil, Horgen District, Canton of Zürich, Switzerland
- Part of: Prehistoric Pile Dwellings around the Alps
- Criteria: Cultural: (iv), (v)
- Reference: 1363-053
- Inscription: 2011 (35th Session)
- Area: 1.49 ha (3.7 acres)
- Buffer zone: 22.5 ha (56 acres)
- Website: www.palafittes.org/en/index.html
- Coordinates: 47°14′48.89″N 8°39′11.65″E

Wädenswil–Vorder Au is one of the 111 serial sites of the UNESCO World Heritage Site Prehistoric pile dwellings around the Alps, of which 56 are located in Switzerland.

== Geography ==
The site is located at the Au peninsula respectively partially on the area of Schloss Au on Zürichsee lakeshore in Au, a locality of the municipality of Wädenswil in the Canton of Zürich in Switzerland. Because the lake has grown in size over time, the original piles are now around 4 metres (13 ft) to 7 metres (23 ft) under the water level of 406 metres (1,332 ft). The settlement comprises 1.49 hectares (3.68 acres), and the buffer zone including the lake area comprises 22.5 hectares (55.60 acres) in all.

== Description ==
Located on the Au peninsula, the site has yielded special pottery from the transitional period between the Pfyn and Horgen cultures. The Corded Ware settlement phase contained a bell beaker, which allowed to draw conclusions on the links between the Corded Ware and Bell Beaker cultures. Since it has yielded a special type of pottery, the Early Bronze Age settlement phase is also important, and helps trace the distribution of Arbon style pottery in the region during the 17th century BC.

== Protection ==
As well as being part of the 56 Swiss sites of the UNESCO World Heritage Site Prehistoric pile dwellings around the Alps, the settlement is also listed in the Swiss inventory of cultural property of national and regional significance as a Class A object of national importance. Hence, the area is provided as a historical site under federal protection, within the meaning of the Swiss Federal Act on the nature and cultural heritage (German: Bundesgesetz über den Natur- und Heimatschutz NHG) of 1 July 1966. Unauthorised researching and purposeful gathering of findings represent a criminal offense according to Art. 24.

== See also ==
- Prehistoric pile dwellings around Zürichsee

== Literature ==
- Peter J. Suter, Helmut Schlichtherle et al.: Pfahlbauten – Palafittes – Palafitte. Palafittes, Biel 2009. ISBN 978-3-906140-84-1.
- Beat Eberschweiler: Ur- und frühgeschichtliche Verkehrswege über den Zürichsee: Erste Ergebnisse aus den Taucharchäologischen Untersuchungen beim Seedamm. In: Mitteilungen des Historischen Vereins des Kantons Schwyz, Volume 96, Schwyz 2004.
