= Schloss Au =

Estate in Au, Switzerland

- Schloss Au (German); Werdmüller Landgut (German)
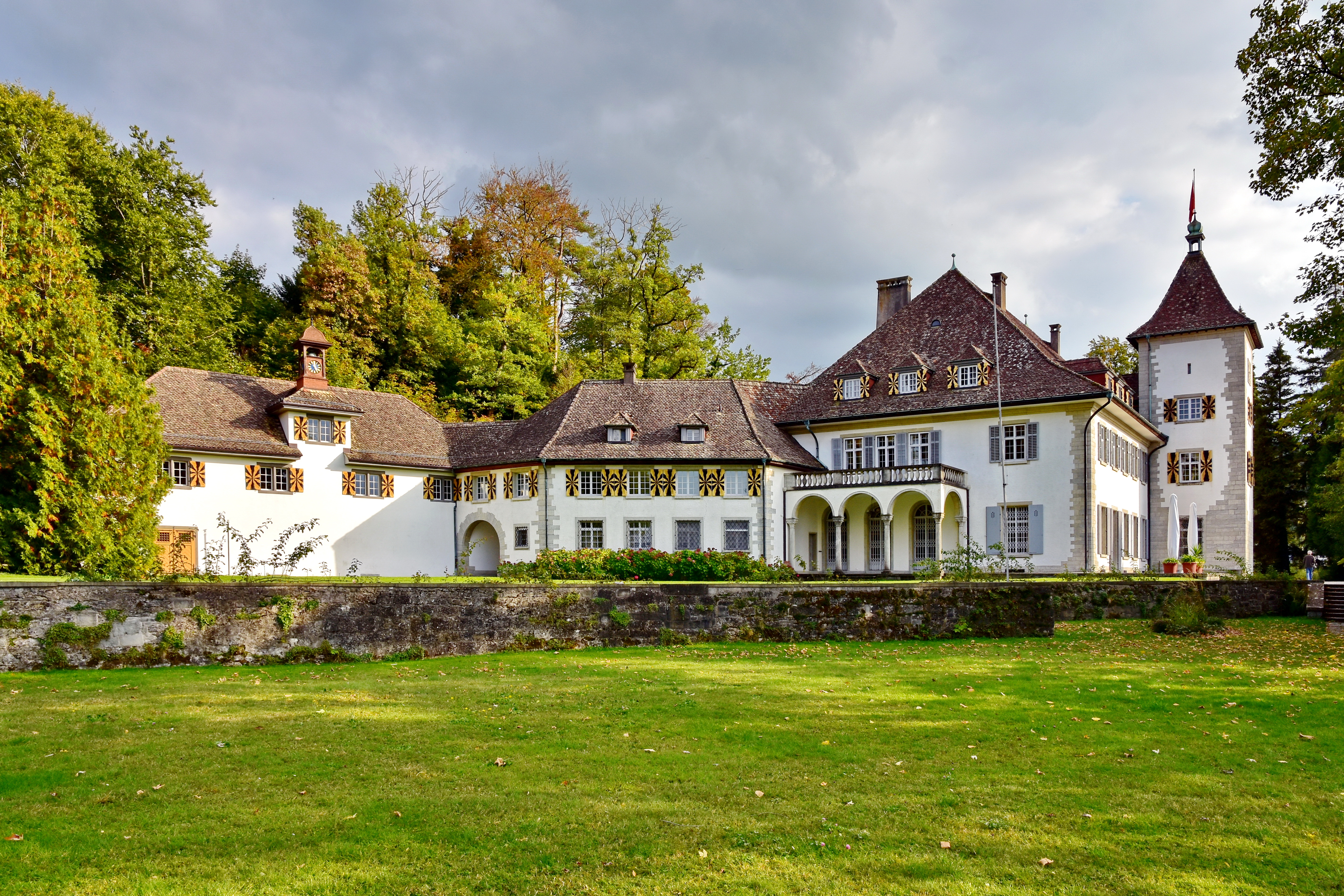
- Interactive map of Schloss Au
- 47°15′2″N 8°38′19″E
- Location: Au Peninsula, Au, Zürich

History
- Built: 1550s; 1928/29 (rebuilt)

Site notes
- Architect: Johann A. Freytag
- Architectural style: Neo Baroque
- Governing body: Canton of Zürich

The Schloss Au, literally "Château Au", is a country estate located in Au, a locality of the municipality of Wädenswil in Switzerland. The spacious estate is situated on the Au Peninsula on Zürichsee lake shore in the Canton of Zurich.

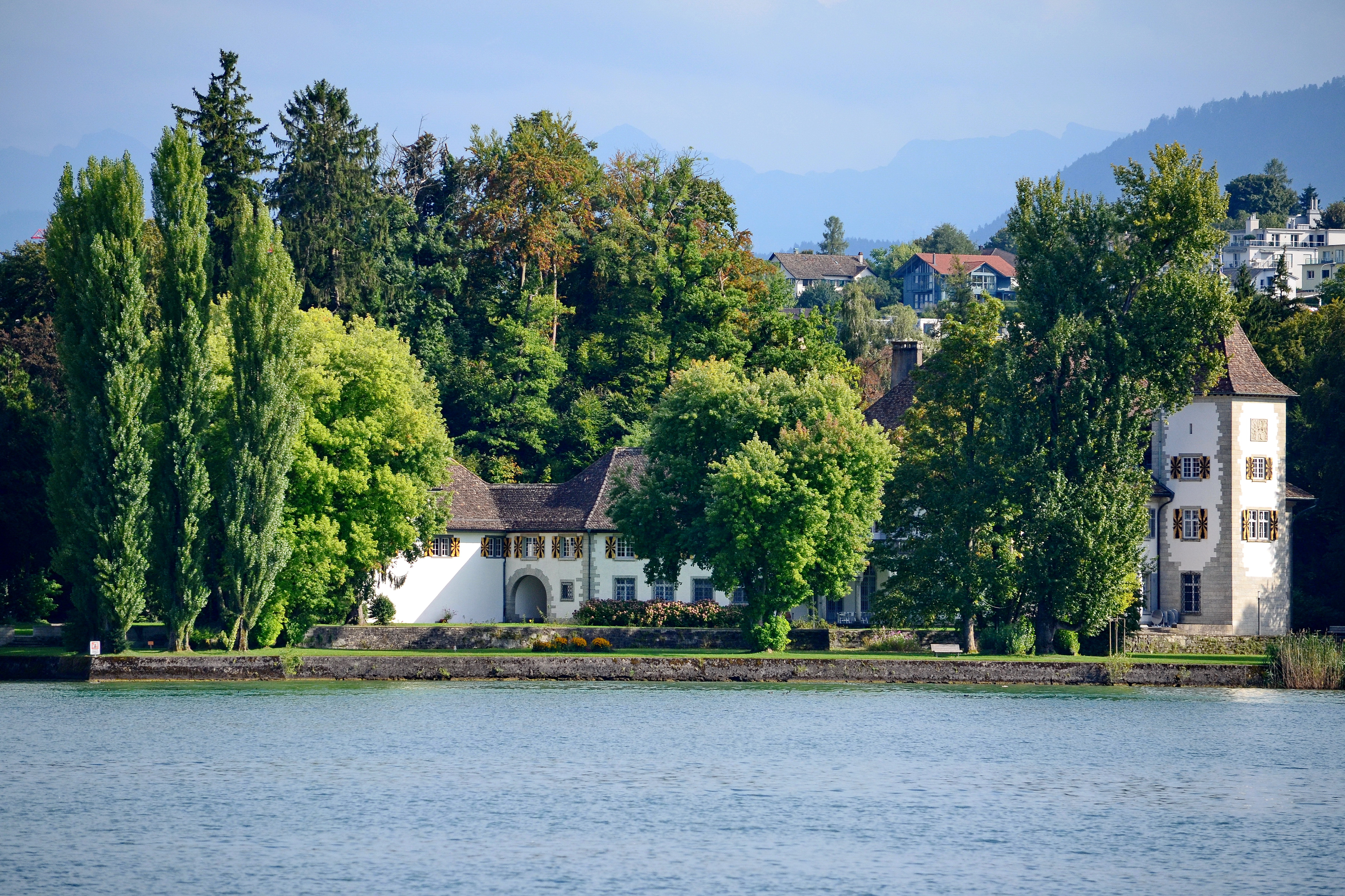
Schloss Au on Au Peninsula as seen from the ZSG paddle steamer Stadt Rapperswil on Zürichsee

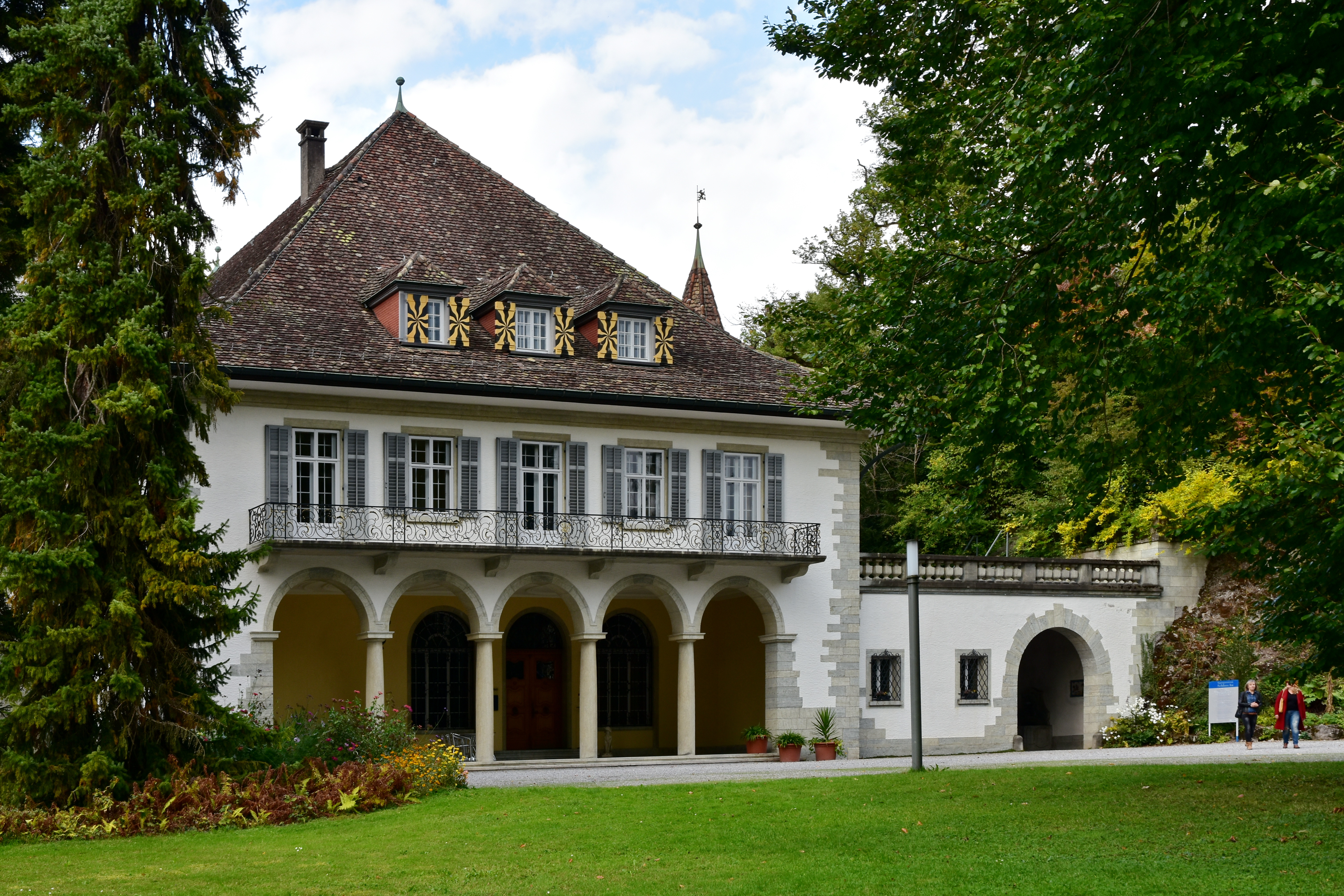
main entrance

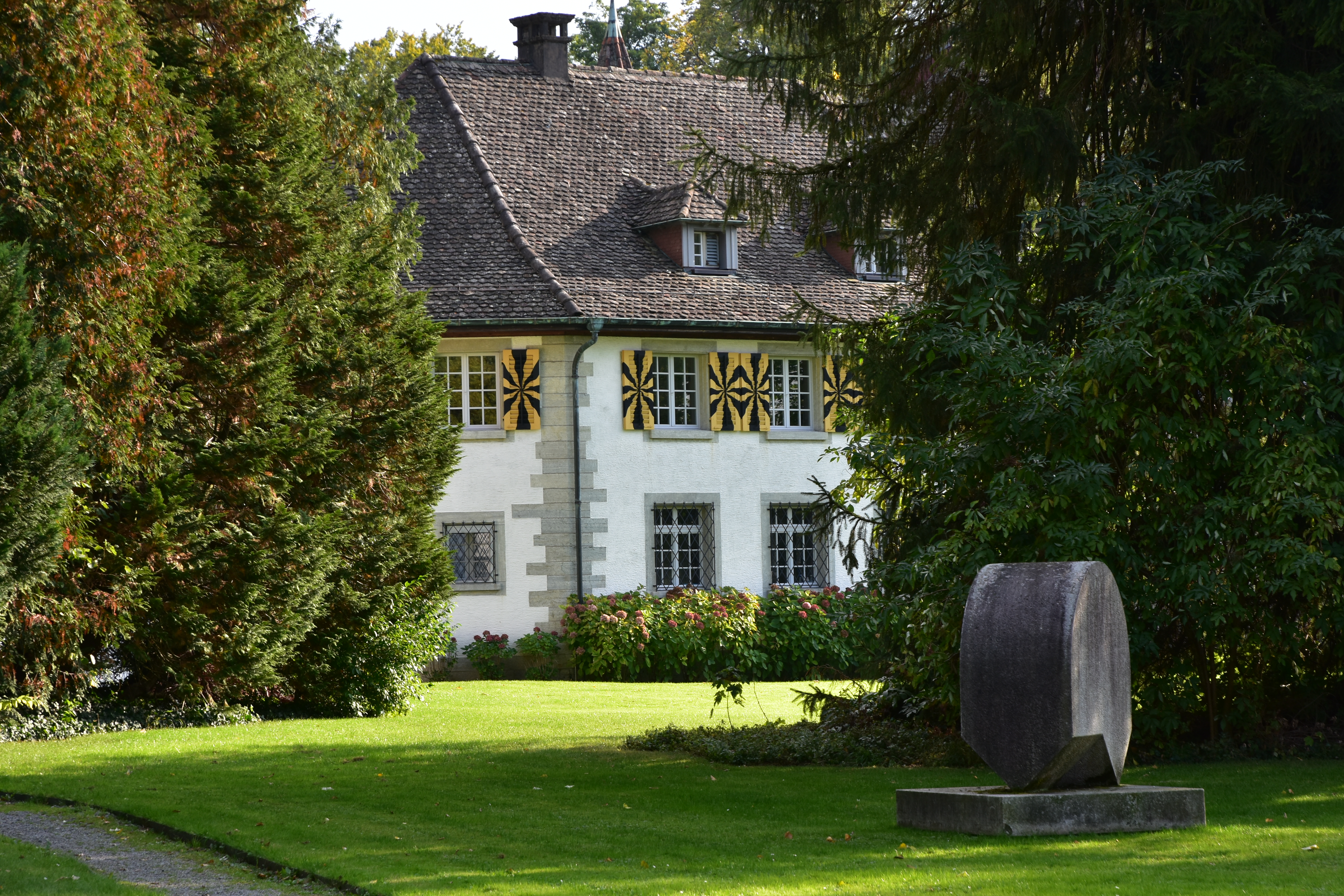
entrance to the park

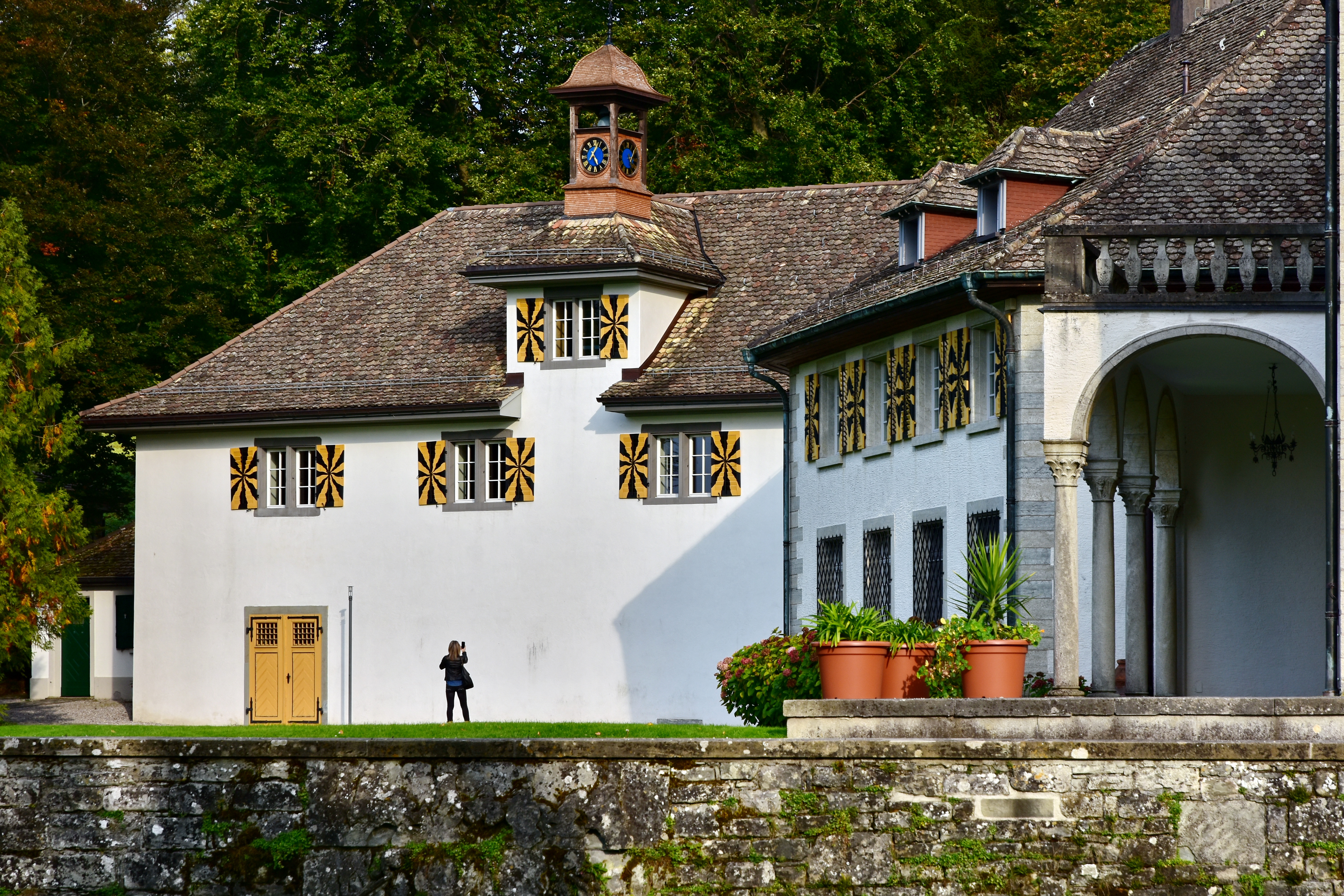
park area

== Architecture ==
In the 1650s Hans Rudolf Werdmüller built a villa in the Venetian style. In 1928/29 it was rebuilt as a neo-baroque villa, constructed by the architect Johann A. Freytag who also integrated the so-called 1720s Werdmüller-Trotte in the north. The main building is characterized by two magnificent loggias on the north and south. To the west the main tower rises, in the eastern courtyard a round tower is situated. The château includes approximately 50 rooms that are partly equipped with marble floors, carpets and objets d'art from the old country house. In the late-1980s its interior was partially renewed to house a conference center. The public access to the château is restricted, but the spacious park and the tower-like Gugger dwelling house on the peninsula's southern slope are popular points of interest.

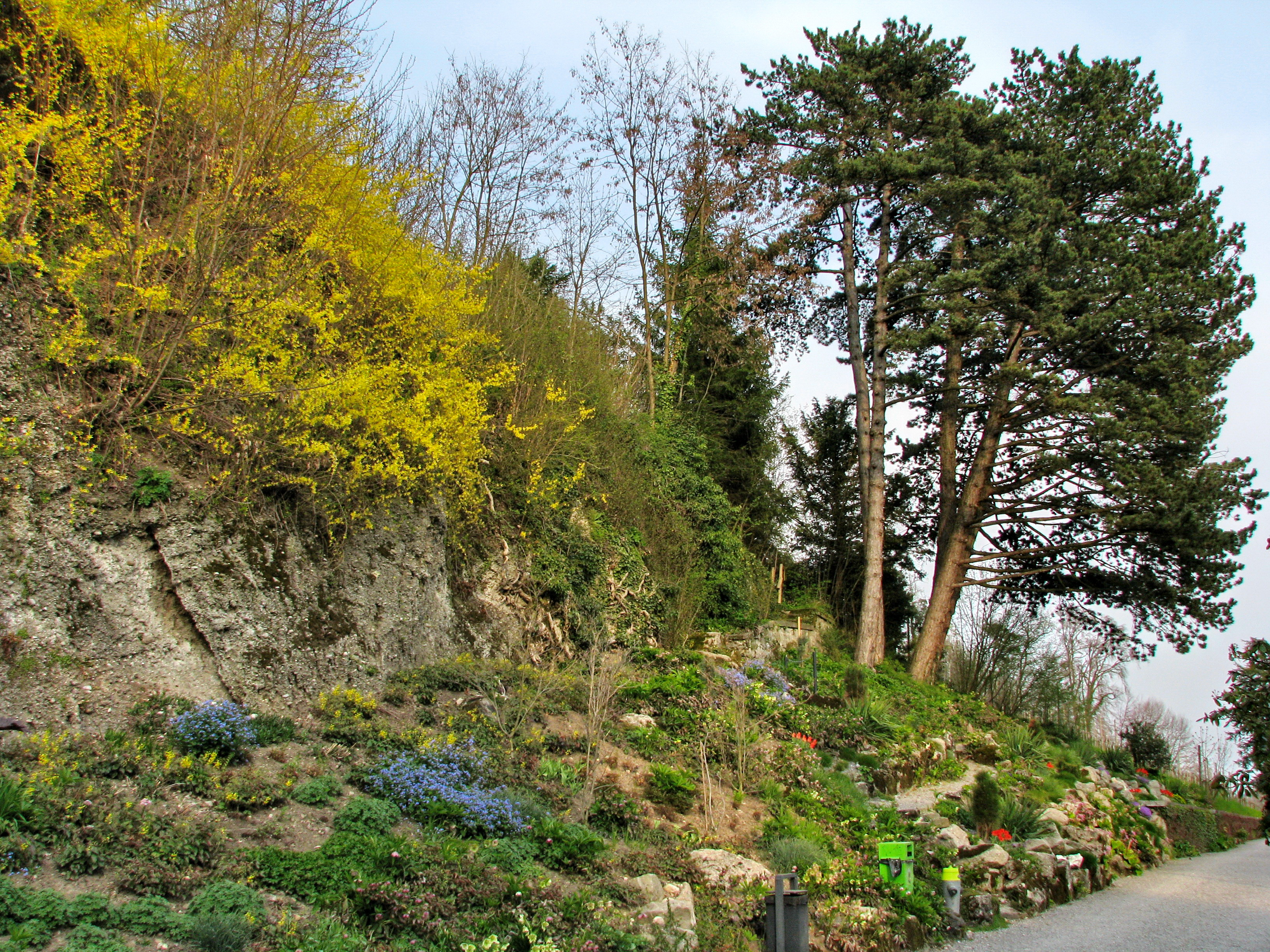
park of the former Werdmüller estate

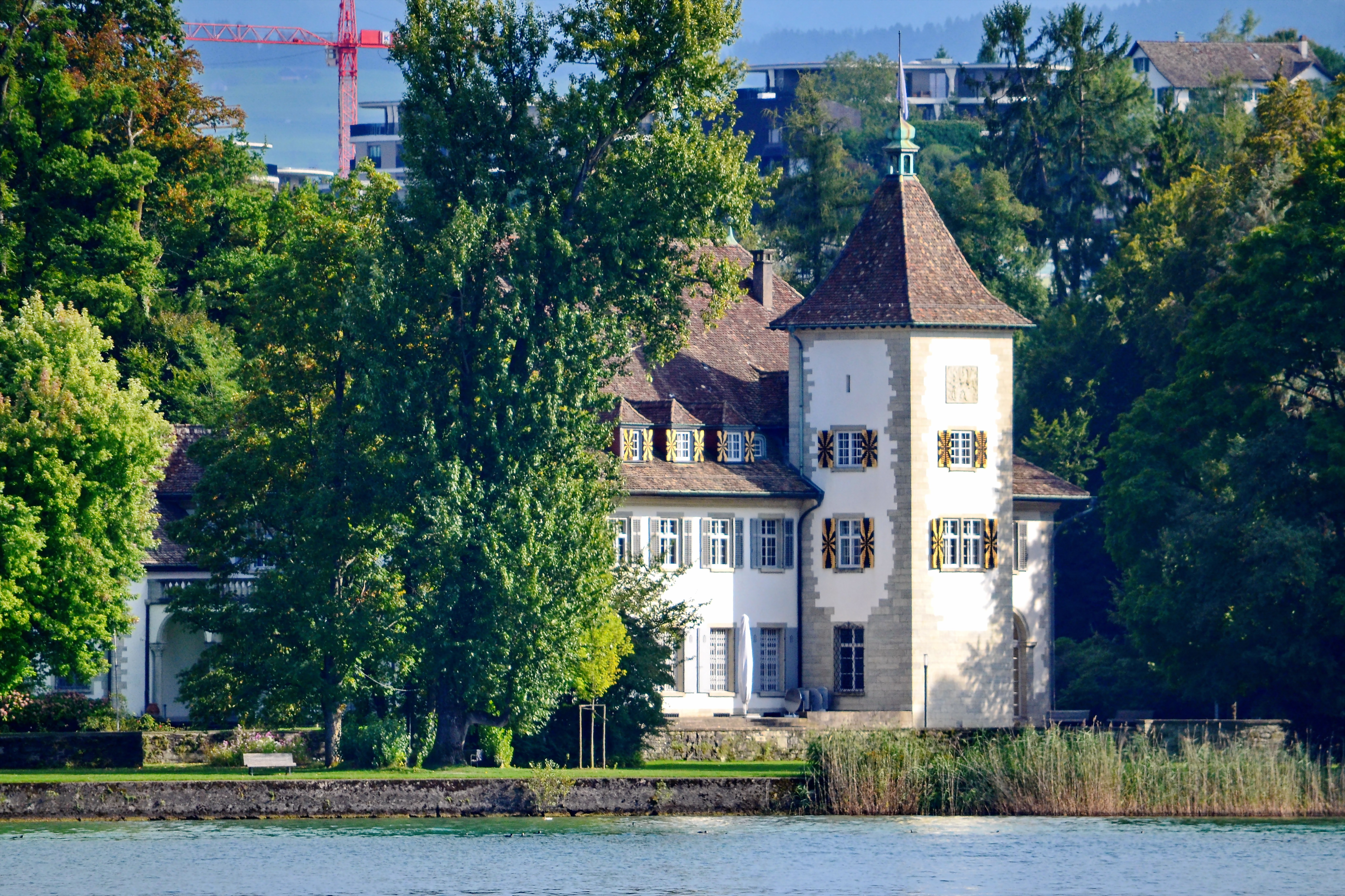
main tower

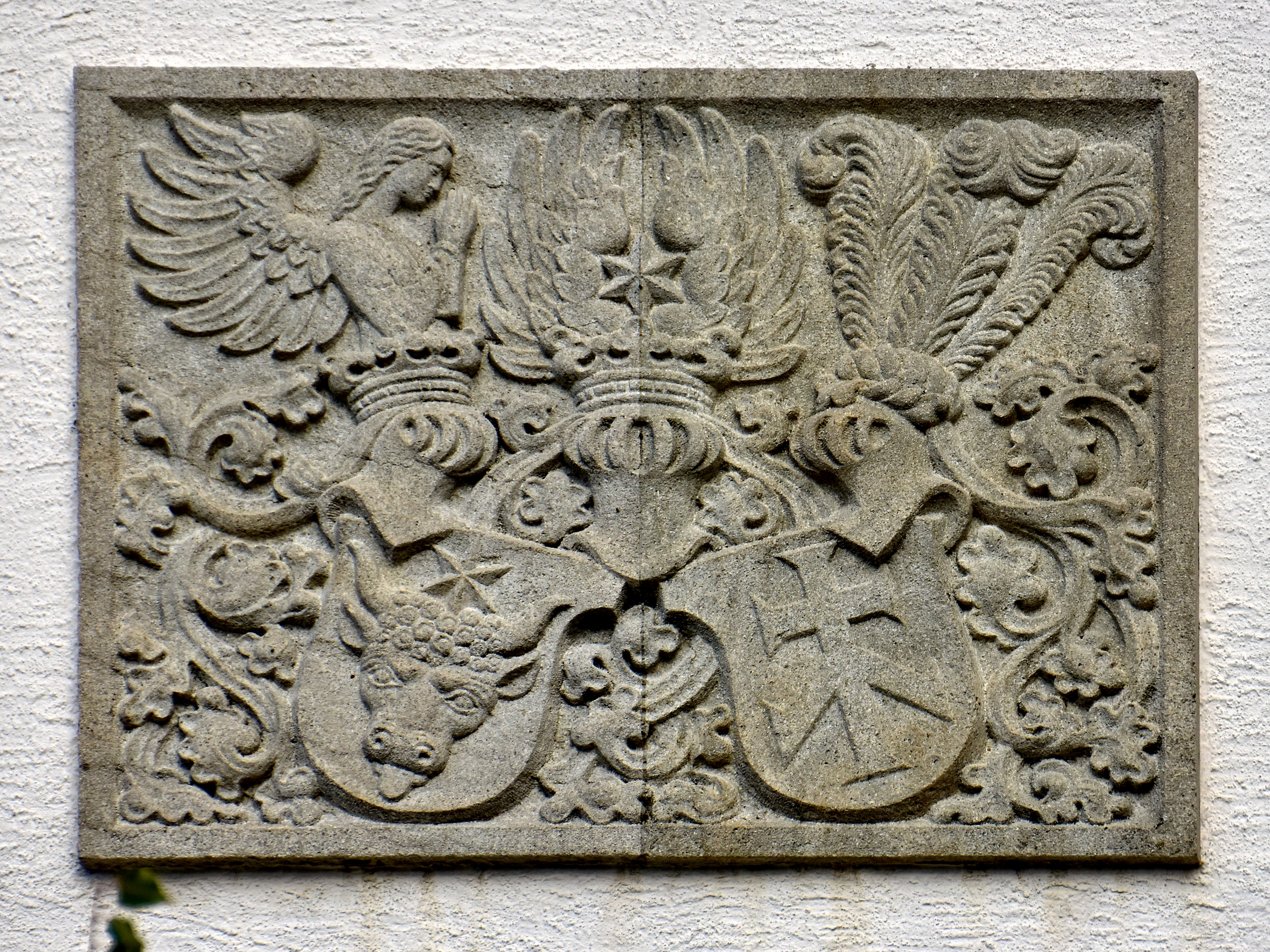
Werdmüller coats of arms on the main tower

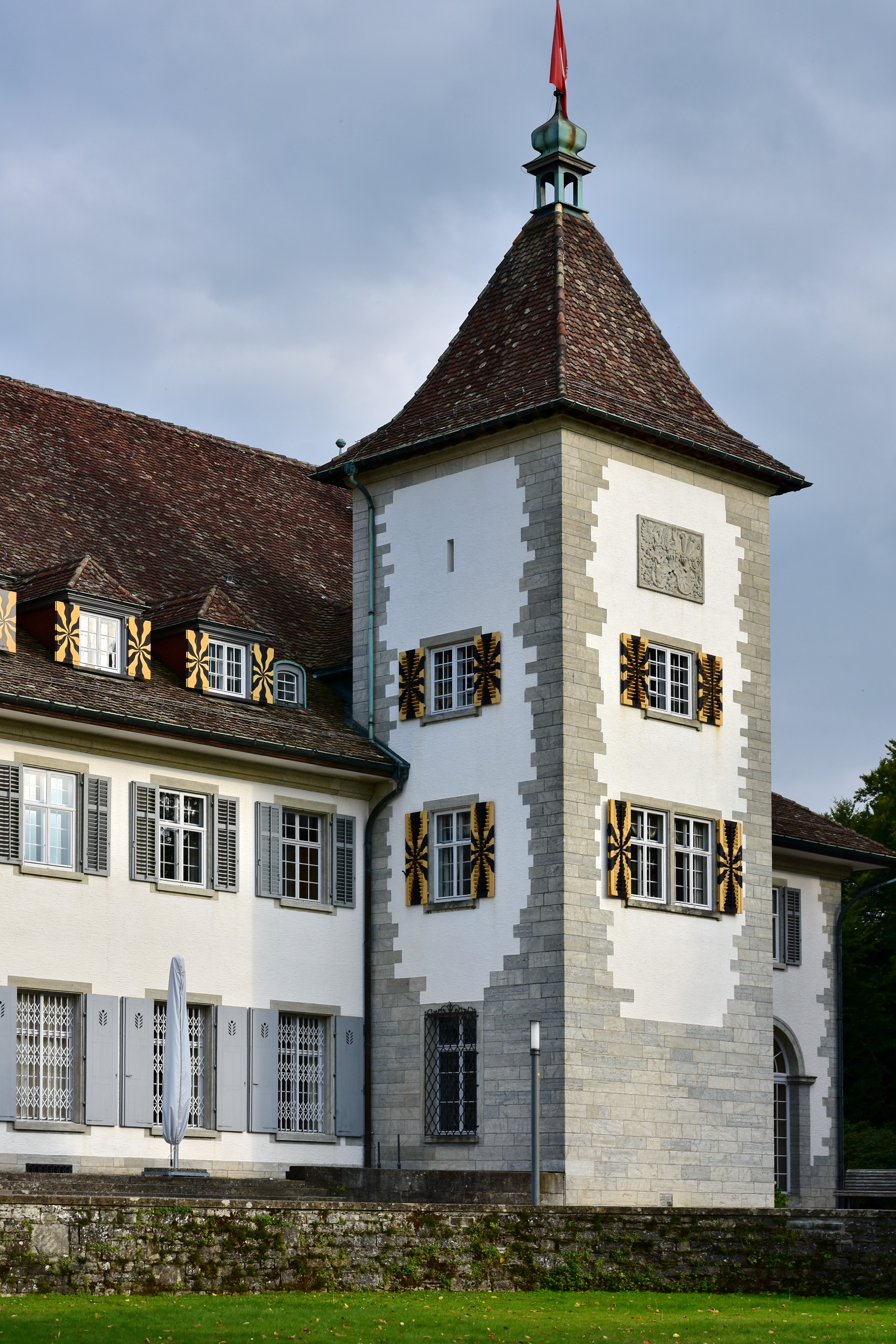

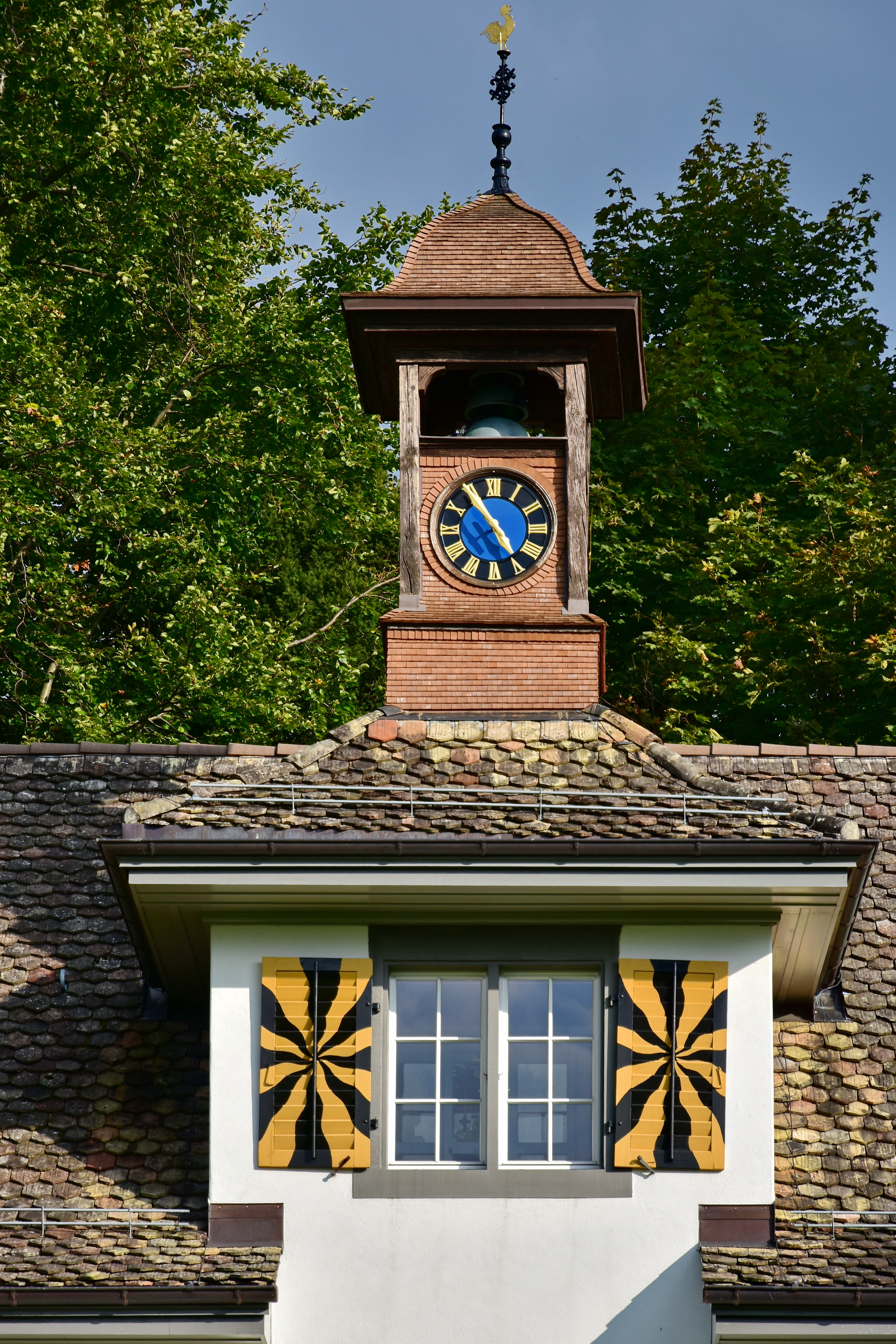
clock tower of the main building

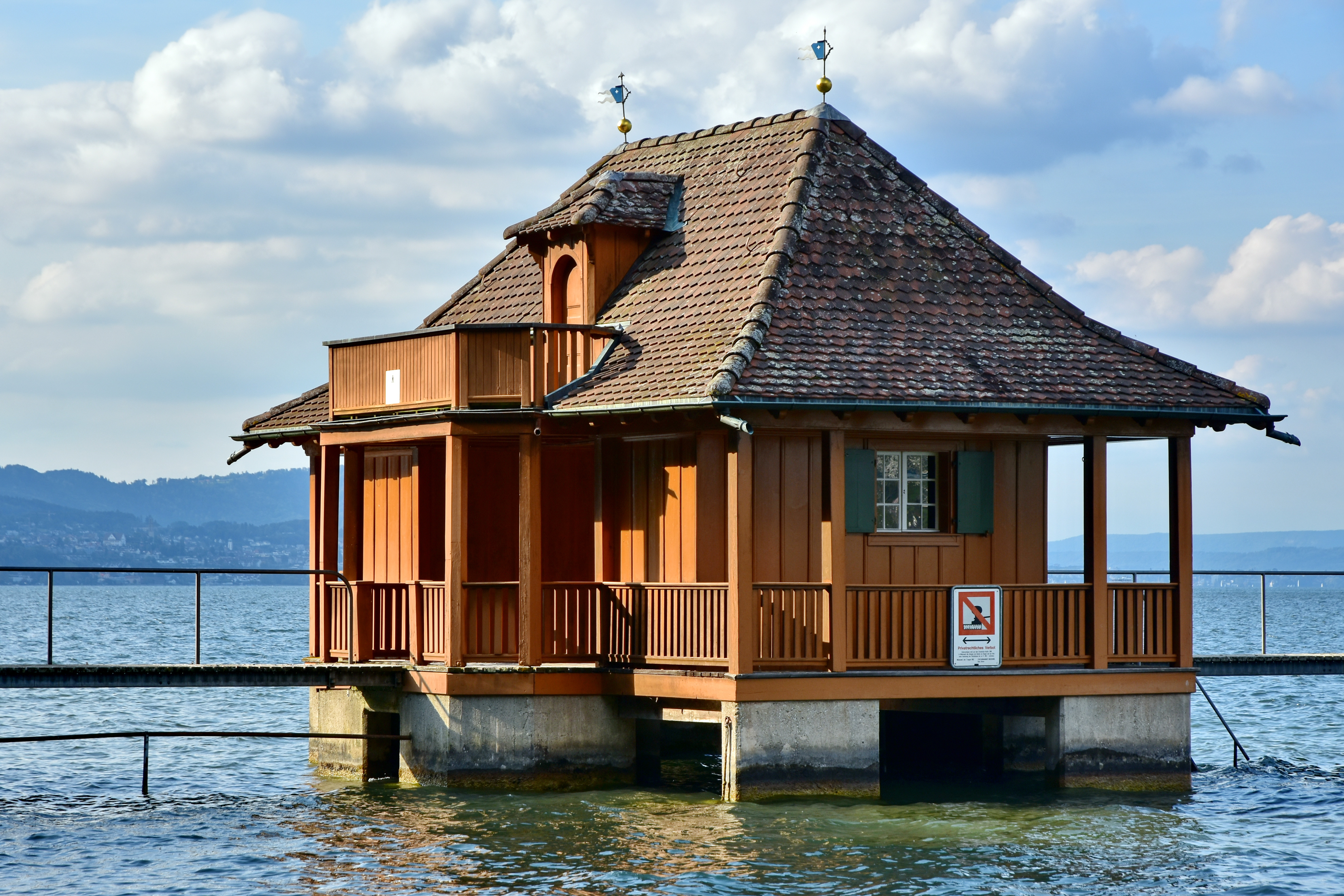
lake shore pavillon

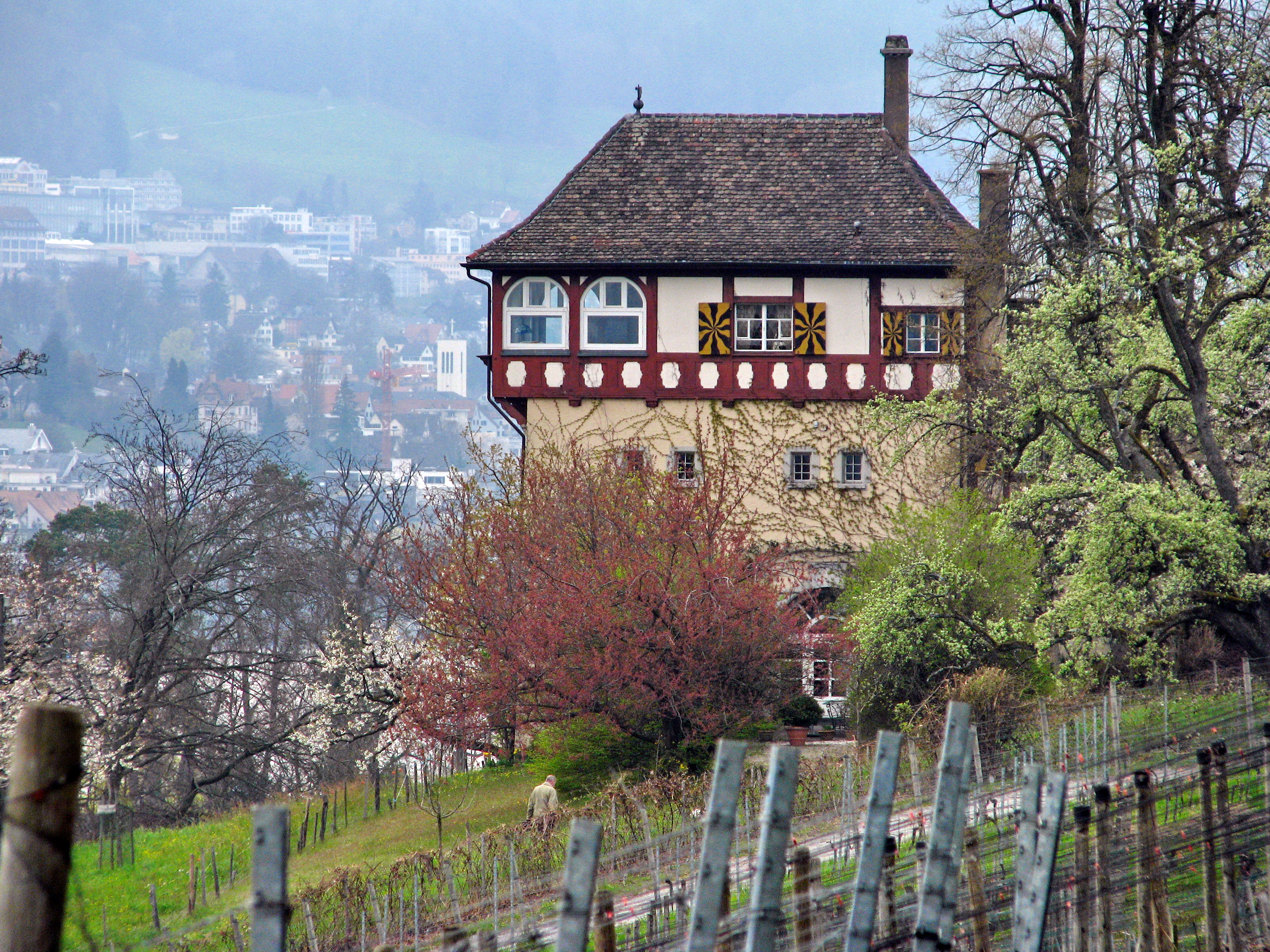
Gugger house

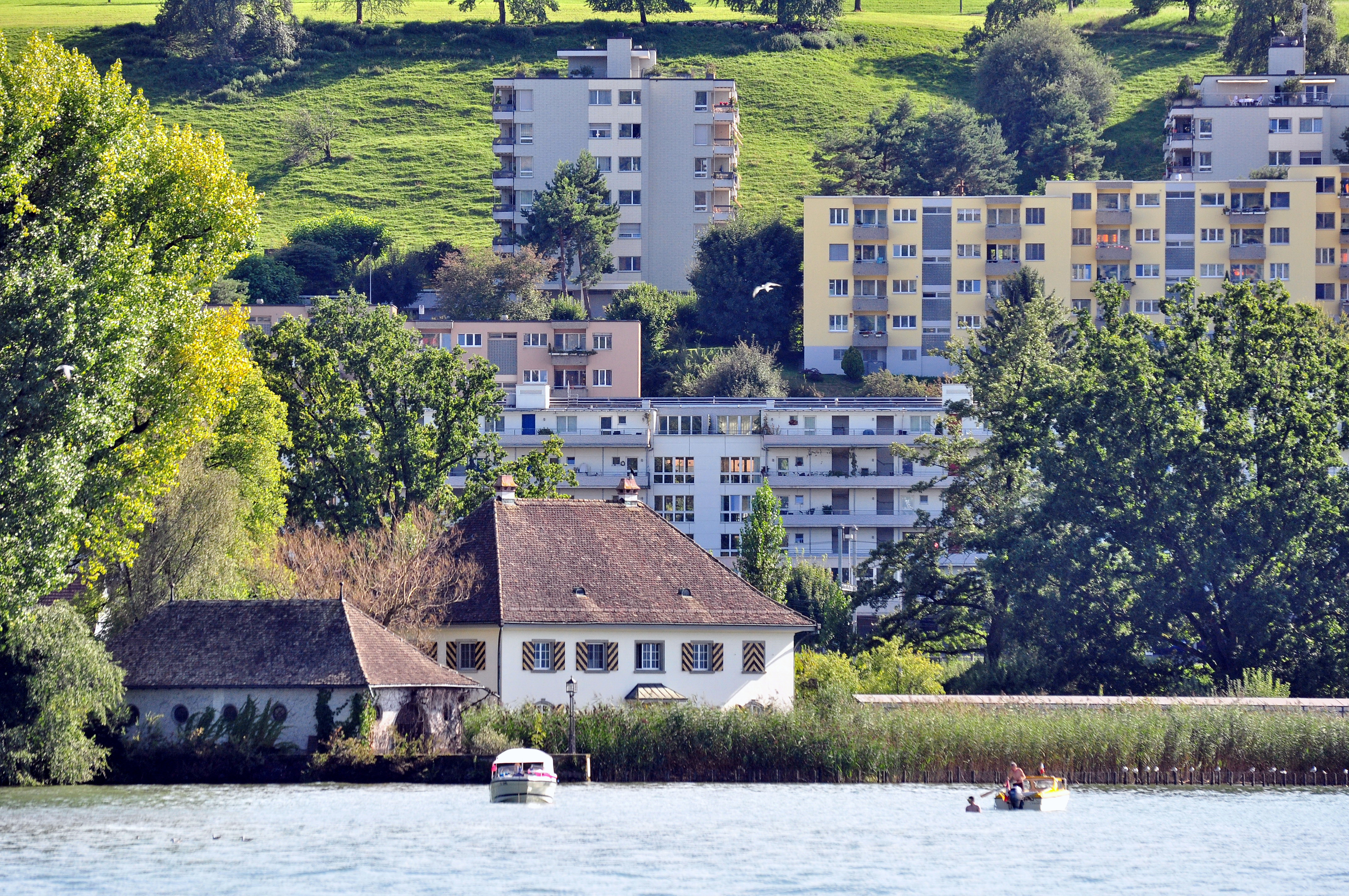
Werdmüller-Trotte

== History ==
In 1650 the lands were given by the city of Zürich to Hans Rudolf Werdmüller who built a villa in the Venetian style where he cultivated horticulture, agriculture, fisheries, and even a blacksmiths workshop. The landside Au lake and the vineyards on the south side were also part of the extensive estate which was sold by Werdmüller's son in 1678. After various changes in ownership, the estate went over into the possession of Colonel Hans von Schulthess-Bodmer, who rebuilt it as a neo-baroque villa in 1928/29.

Among the famous residents was the author Mentona Moser (1874–1971) who was raised on the Au peninsula: "Ich habe gelebt" (I've lived, among others with Au-related descriptions) in one of her published books. Her mother, Fanny Moser was considered one of the richest women in Europe in the 19th century; in her residence "Belle au bois dormant" she met poets, philosophers, scientists and people perverted from trade and industry. The estate and the little landside lake belong since 1989 to the Canton of Zürich; in 1985 its last owner Eric Alex von Schulthess handed over the property and the comprehensive lands to the canton of Zürich to establish a conference center, and thus to the public. As of 2015 the building is used as conference center Tagungszentrum Schloss Au by the cantonal college of education PHZH.

== Cultural heritage ==
The estate, its auxiliary buildings and the park are listed in the Swiss inventory of cultural property of national and regional significance as a Class B object of regional importance.

Also located on the Au Peninsula, is the Neolithic site named Wädenswil–Vorder Au which is one of the numerous sites of Prehistoric pile dwellings around Zürichsee with numerous finds from the transitional period between the Pfyn and Horgen cultures, as well as relicts of the Bell Beaker culture. The area of the settlement partially is located on the roughly 26 hectares (64 acres) large lands of the country estate.
