= Au (squat) =

Squatted building in Frankfurt, Germany

Coordinates: 50°7′17.98″N 8°35′58.57″E

- Interactive map of the Au area

General information
- Classification: Housing project Self-managed social centre
- Location: Frankfurt, Germany
- Opened: Squatted 1983

Website
- au-frankfurt.org

Au (German pronunciation: [aʊ]) is the name of a building that has been squatted since 1983 in Rödelheim in Frankfurt, Germany. It bills itself as a 'self-organised cultural Centre and living project' (German: Selbstverwaltetes Kulturelles Zentrum und Wohnprojekt).

Au was home to the Au Squat Festival on June 3, 2006, featuring many punk rock bands such as The Restarts. The 2007 festival was on June 9 with bands such as Sensa Yuma and the 2008 festival took place on June 7 with headliners Life... But How to Live It?. Any profits went to human rights organizations and were also given to antifascist networks and other autonomous centres. Beside the open air festival there are many other concerts and cultural or political events during the year.

== History ==
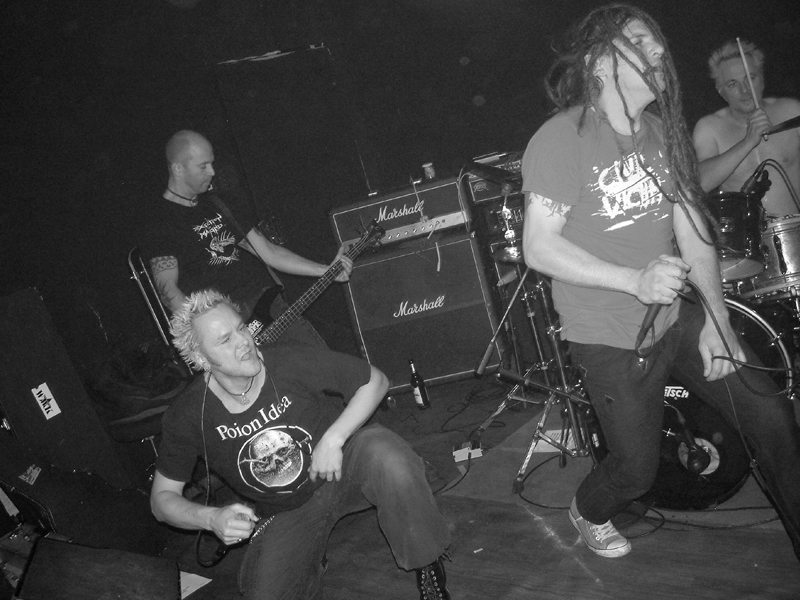
The Punk band "Accion Mutante" playing a gig at Au in 2010

The Au was occupied on June 4, 1983. The Frankfurt municipality bought the building from the Deutsche Bibliothek for 4.3 million Marks in 1988.

== Eviction threat ==
In the aftermath of the protests at the 2017 G20 summit in Hamburg, local politicians made statements about the Au. The FDP and Alternative for Germany (AfD) all demanded that the centre was evicted. The CDU suggested the Au paid rent. In response, the Greens and the SPD cautioned against hasty actions.

== Arson attacks ==
In late 2018, there was a spate of arson attacks against left-wing projects in the Rhine-Main region. The Au was attacked twice in November with fires started in the garden. Both times the residents were able to extinguish the flames. Nobody was apprehended. In a joint statement, representatives of Au and other autonomous spaces viewed the attacks as politically motivated and blamed the “dangerous sentiment against left projects” created by the previous statements of political parties.
