= Au, Guinea =

- Location in Guinea
- Coordinates: 11°53′N 8°53′W
- Country: Guinea
- Region: Kankan Region

Au is a town in the Kankan Region of eastern Guinea, north of the Niger River.
