= Au Peninsula =

Swiss peninsula

Coordinates: 47°14′57″N 8°38′46″E

Native name: Halbinsel Au
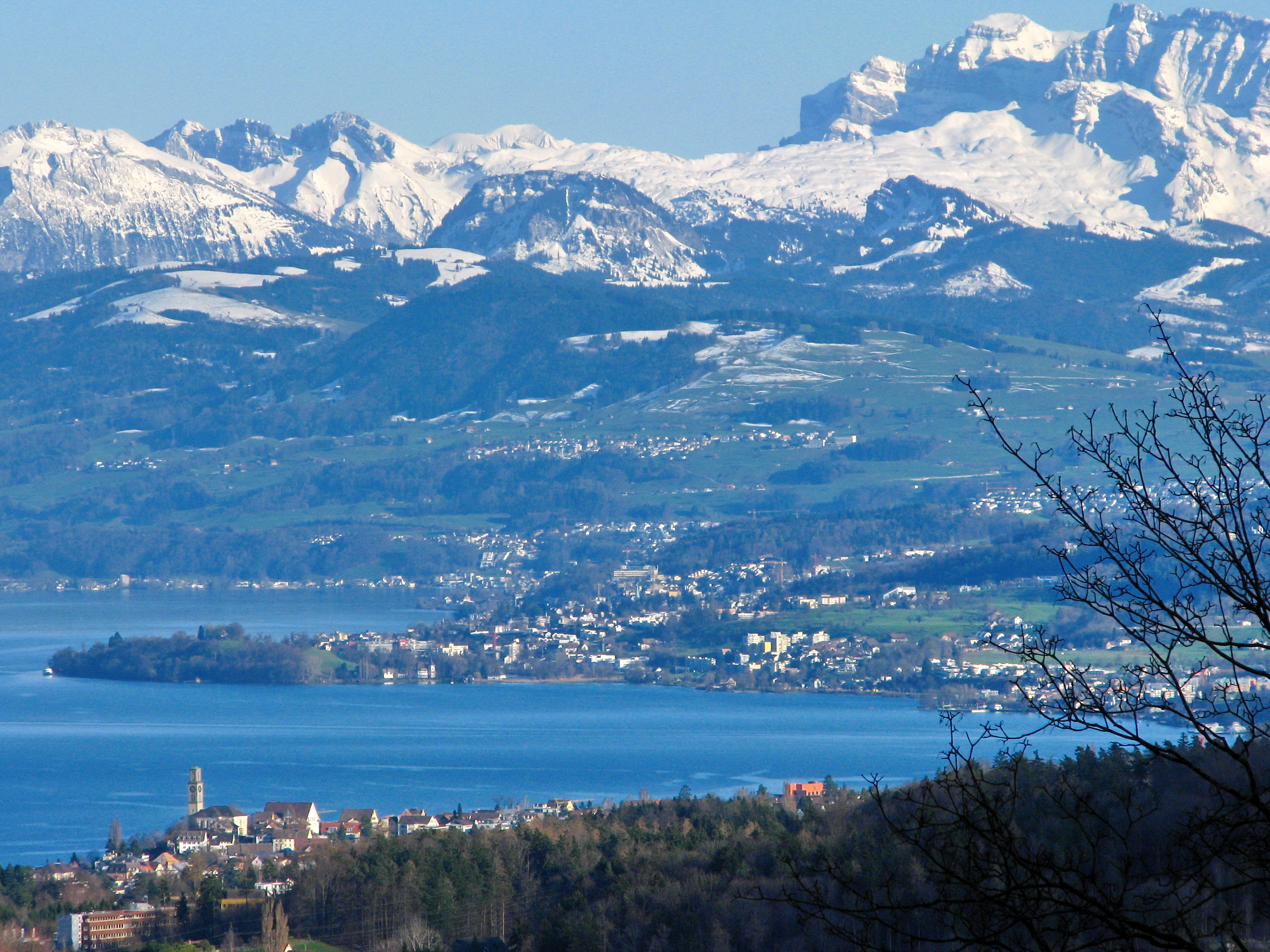
- Au Peninsula as seen from Felsenegg

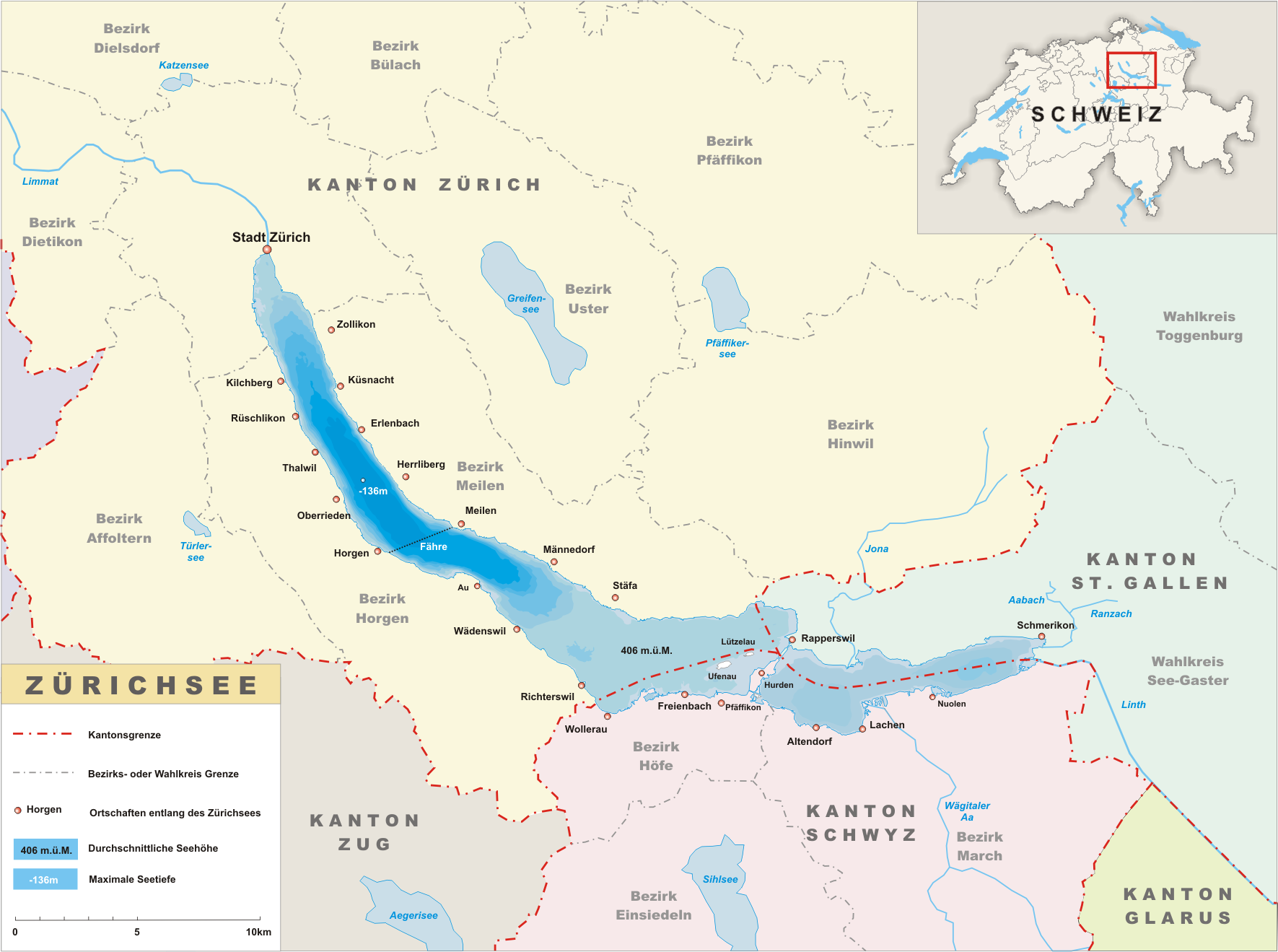

Geography
- Location: Peninsula at Au, Zürich, on Zürichsee lake shore
- Area: 0.5 km^{2} (0.19 sq mi)

Administration
- Switzerland
- Canton: Canton of Zürich
- District: Horgen

The Au Peninsula (German: Halbinsel Au) is located on the Swiss Zürichsee lake shore in the municipality of Au, Canton of Zürich.

== Geography ==
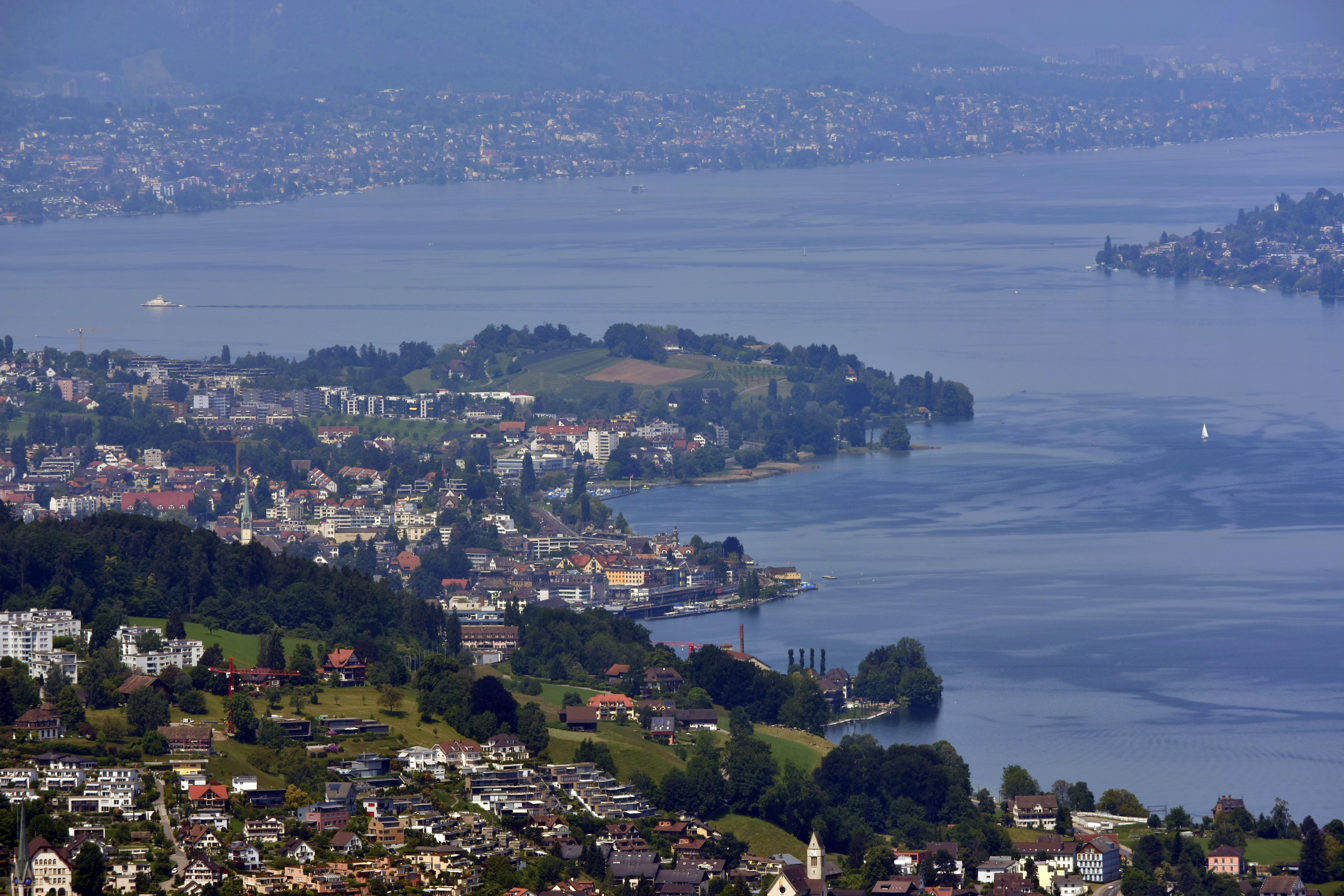
Halbinsel Au as seen from the Zimmerberg plateau towards the Etzel mountain

Au is a peninsula situated on the southwestern Zürichsee lake shore on the slope of the Zimmerberg plateau. In its south, between the headland and the peninsula, a small lake respectively a reed landscape to the north is situated. The area is located in the municipality of Au between Wädenswil and Horgen.

== History ==
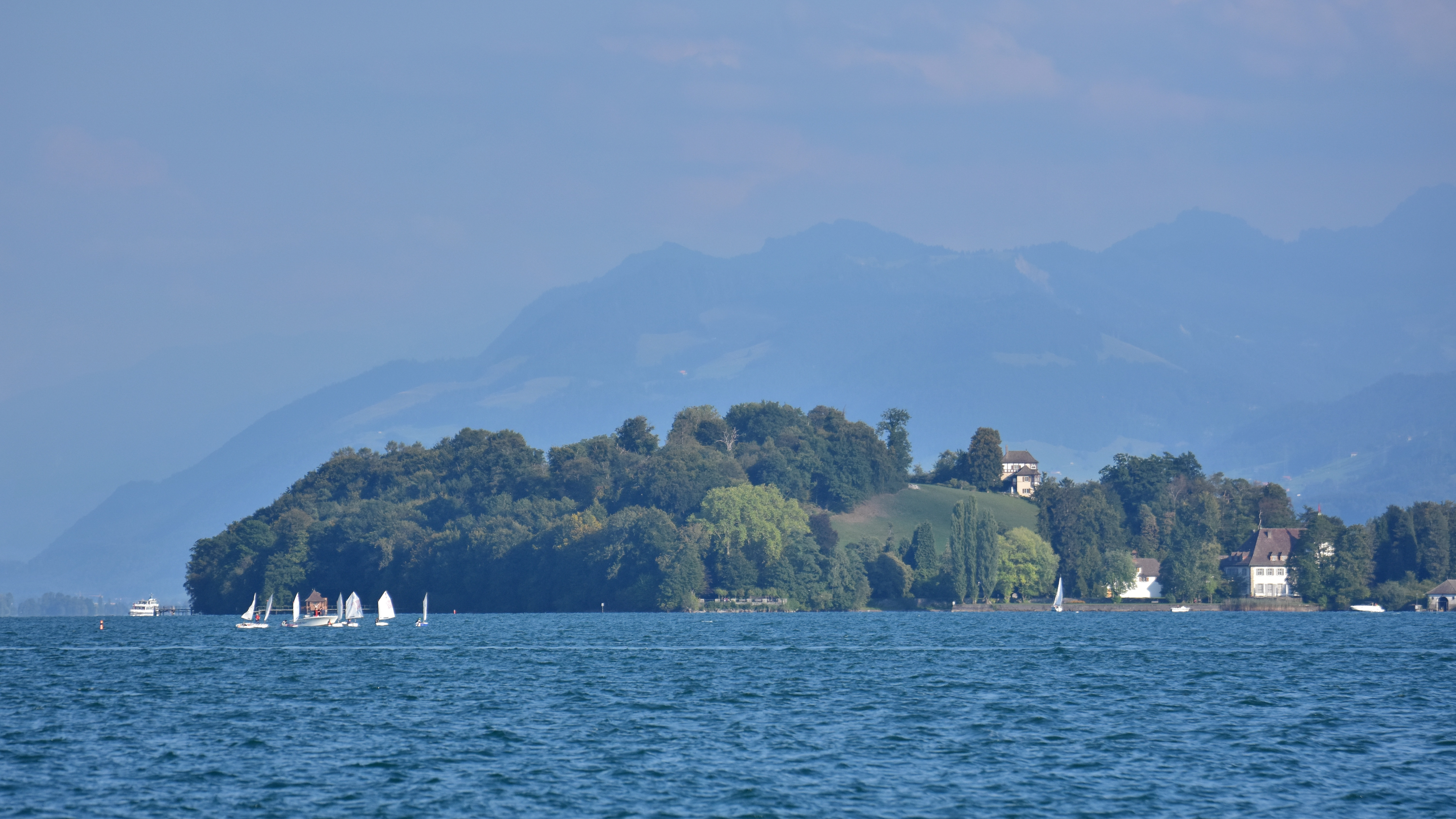
The peninsula as seen from the north

Located on the Au peninsula, the Neolithic site named Wädenswil–Vorder Au is one of the numerous sites of Prehistoric pile dwellings around Zürichsee. At Au numerous pottery and textile finds from the transitional period between the Pfyn and Horgen were excavated, as well as relics of the Bell Beaker culture.

The roughly 0.5 square kilometres (0.19 mi^{2}) large peninsula is first mentioned in the year 1316 as «Owe» belonging to the commandry of the Knights Hospitaller in Bubikon. Its name may be derived from the German term Au, meaning an "inland island" because its southern small lake. Sold by the Knights Hospitallers in 1550, until 1835 it was a domain of the old city republic of Zürich. The farm Au was acquired by the Swiss General Hans Rudolf Werdmüller (1614–1677) in 1550. The Au peninsula got further literary honor: The German poet Friedrich Gottlieb Klopstock (1724–1803) immortalized his 1750s visit in his „Ode an den Zürichsee“ (Ode to the Lake Zürich), and again in 1878 in Conrad Ferdinand Meyer's novel about Werdmüller. In 1835 the former city republic, now the Canton of Zürich, sold the Au lands, and so the first restaurant was built on hilltop in 1865/66; it became popular as "Pensions- und Cur-Anstalt Au" (rebuilt in 1957/59 as Landgasthaus) in the 1900s, but it had to be sold for financial reasons. That's why local industrials founded the so-called Au-Consortium in 1911, that bought the middle part of the Au hill respectively those buildings together with the guest house and prevented the idyllic peninsula to be overbuilt and preserved it for public use.

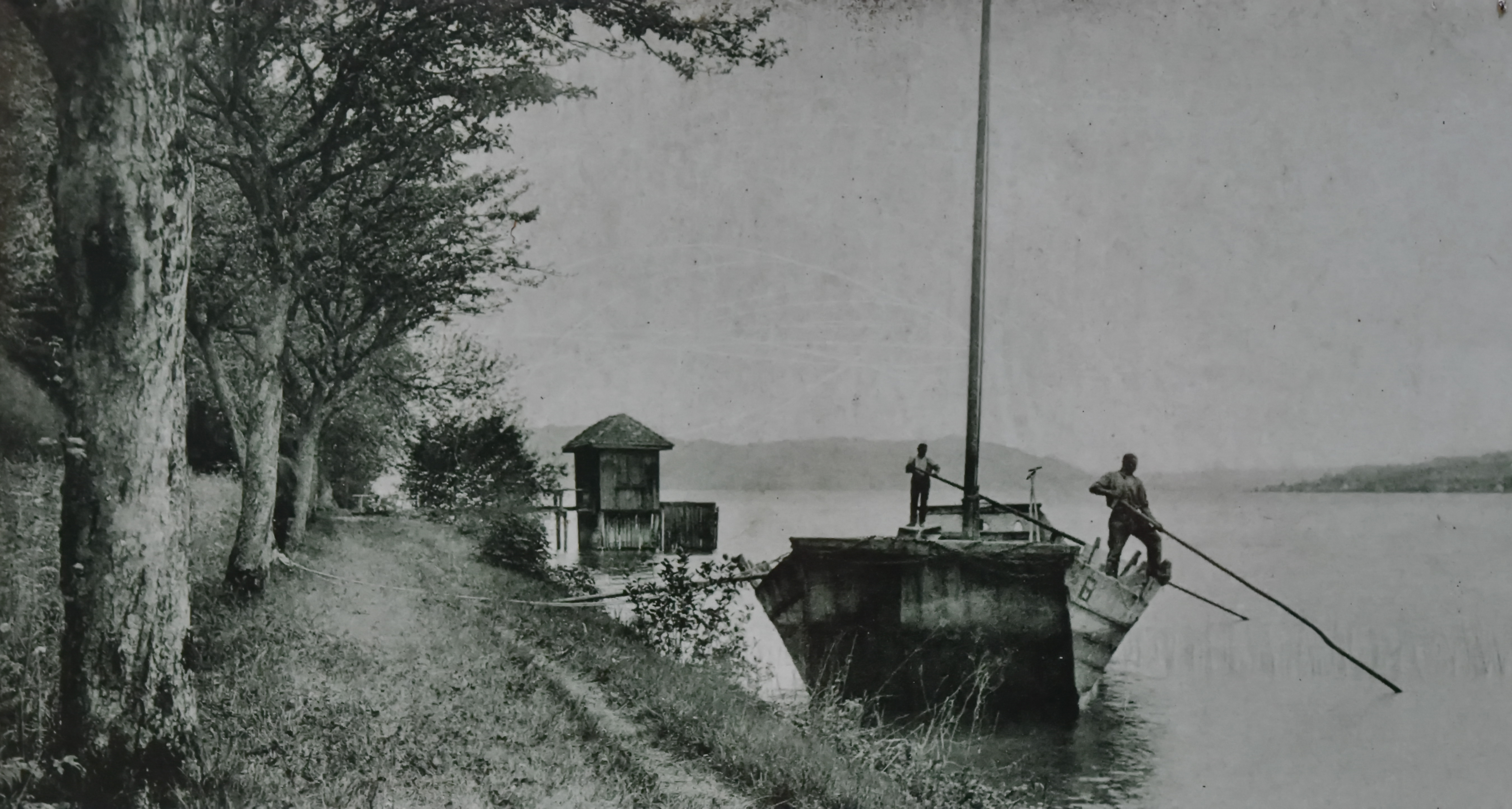
a so-called Ledischiff transport boat at the landing gate of the Meilibach brickworks on Zürichsee lake shore

To the 1920s the Meilibach company was situated nearby and shipped the bricks produced in its factory with so-called Ledischiff transport boats from a small artificial harbour at the location of the present boathouse of the Schloss Au. In 1951 the vineyards at the southern slope of the Au hill were re-established for education and scientific purposes by the former Obst- und Weinfachschule. Around the old Au farm an historical orchard was established in 1976, and the wine museum opened in 1978.

== Points of interest ==
Further highlights on Au peninsula include the spacious park of Schloss Au, the hiking trail around the peninsula and its protected area, picnic places and a small lido on Zürichsee lake shore, and the Wine museum and its vineyards. The peninsula has also a renowned restaurant (Landgasthof).

=== Schloss Au ===
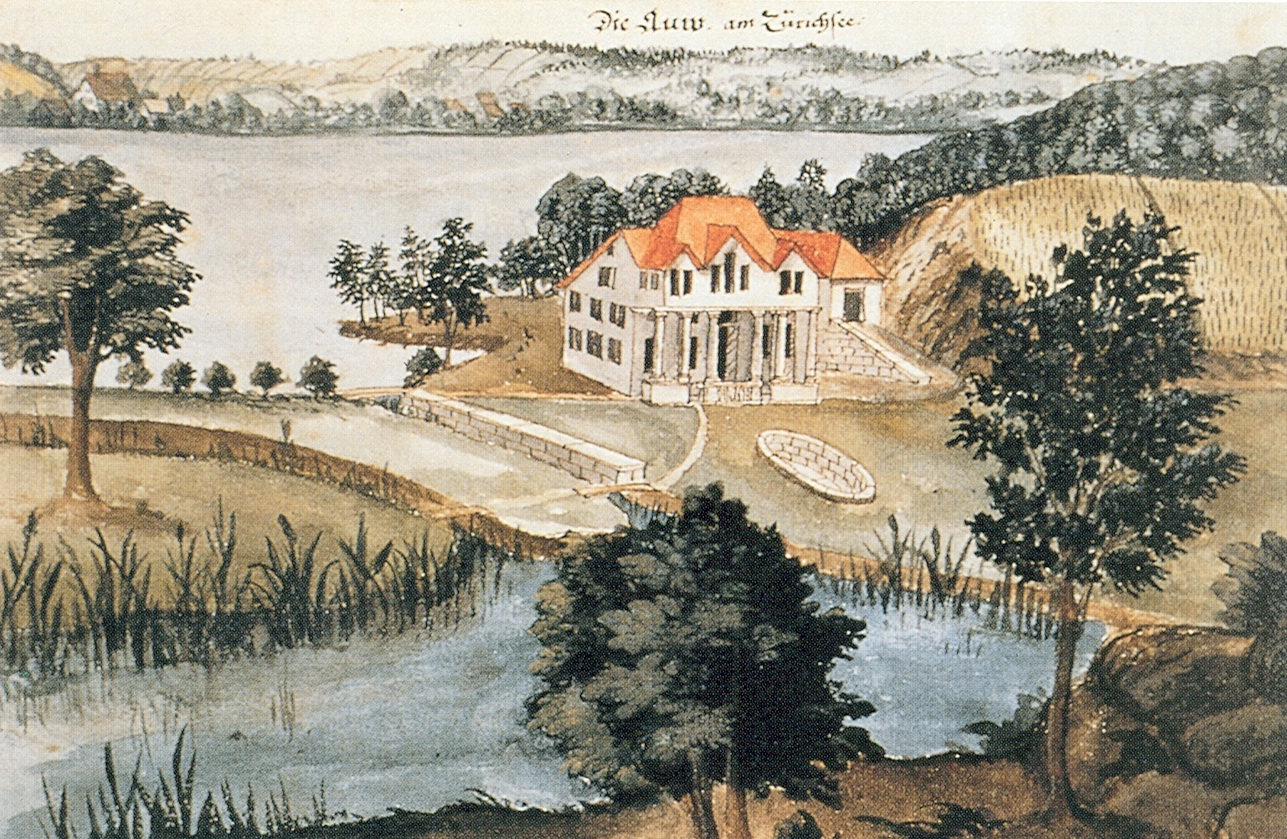
Werdmüller estate (1673)

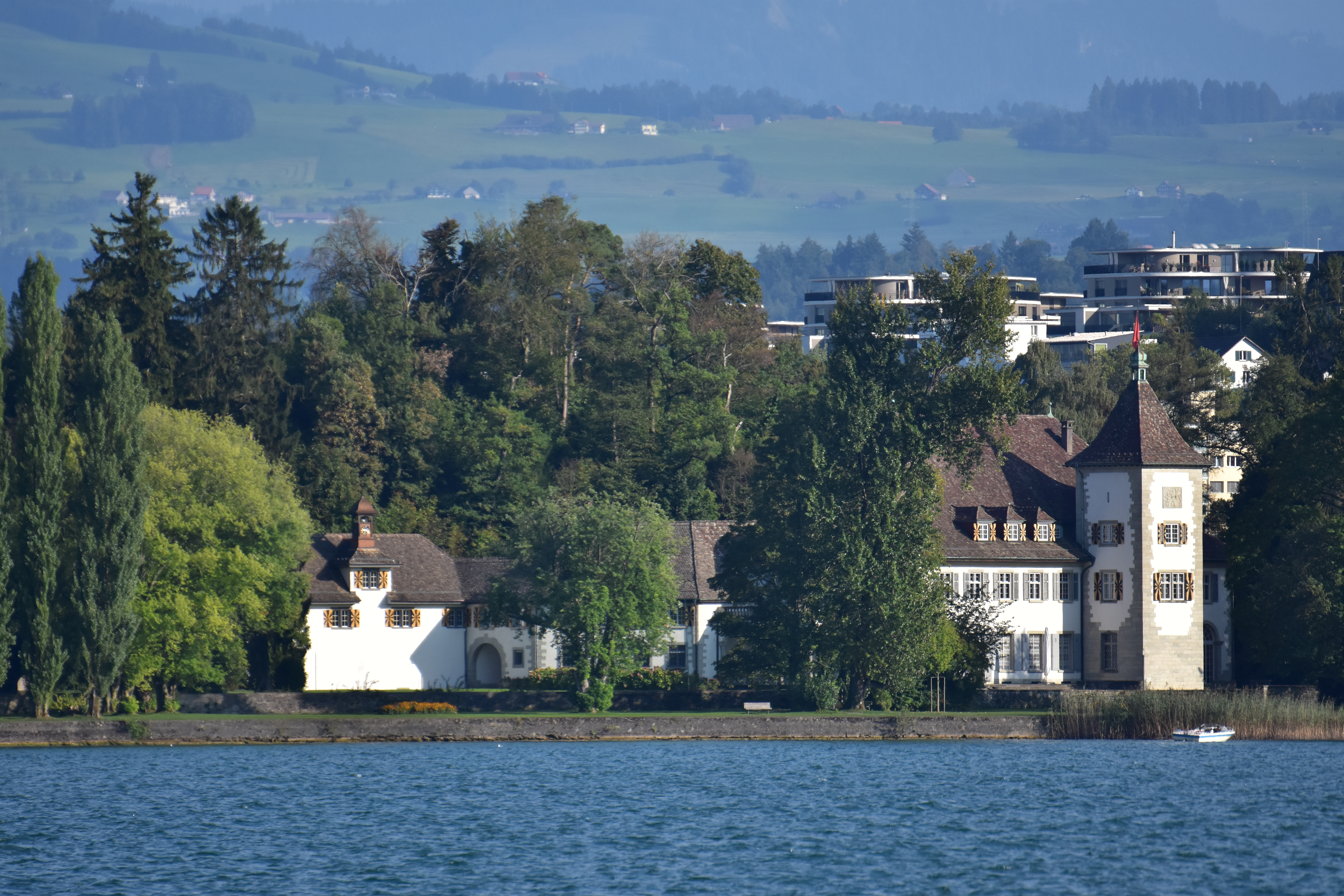
Schloss Au

In 1650 the lands were given by the city of Zürich to Hans Rudolf Werdmüller who built a villa in the Venetian style where he cultivated horticulture, agriculture, fisheries, and even a blacksmiths workshop. The Au lake and the vineyards on the south side were also part of the extensive estate which was sold by Werdmüller's son in 1678. The estate went over into the possession of Colonel Hans von Schulthess-Bodmer, who rebuilt it 1928/29 as a neo-baroque villa, constructed by architect Johann A. Freytag. Among the famous residents was the author Mentona Moser (1874–1971) who was born on the Au peninsula: „Ich habe gelebt“ (I've lived, among others with Au-related descriptions) is one of her published books. Her mother was considered one of the richest women in Europe in the 19th century; in her residence „Belle au bois dormant“ she met poets, philosophers, scientists and people perverted from trade and industry. The estate and the little landside lake belong since 1989 to the Canton of Zürich; in 1985 Eric Alex von Schulthess handed over the property to the canton to establish a conference center, and thus to the public, as part of the comprehensive 26 hectares (64 acres) area. Though the buildings usually just partially are accessible to the public, the castle's spacious park and the tower-like Gugger dwelling house the peninsula's hill are further points of interest.

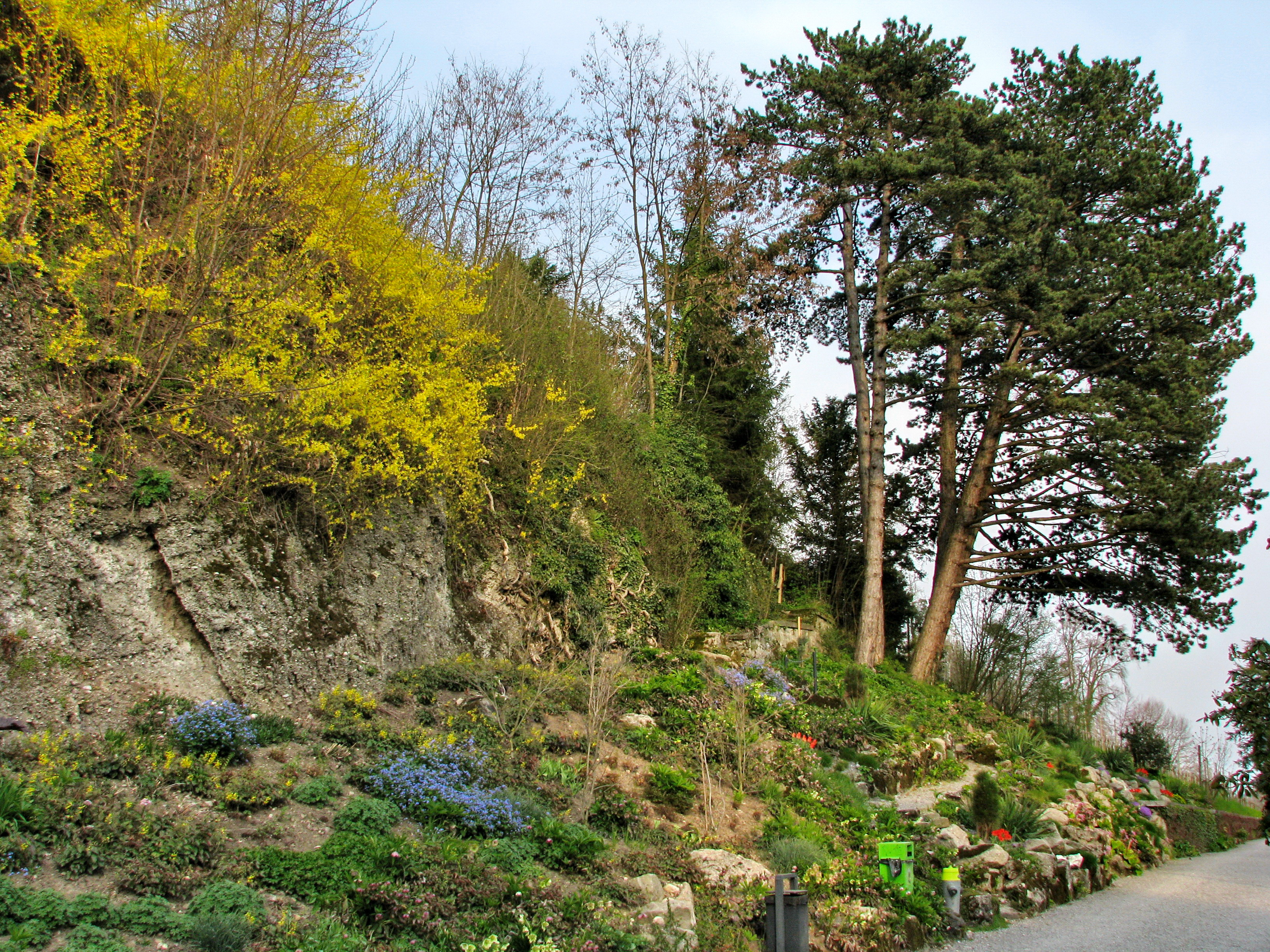
Park of the Werdmüller estate (Schloss Au)

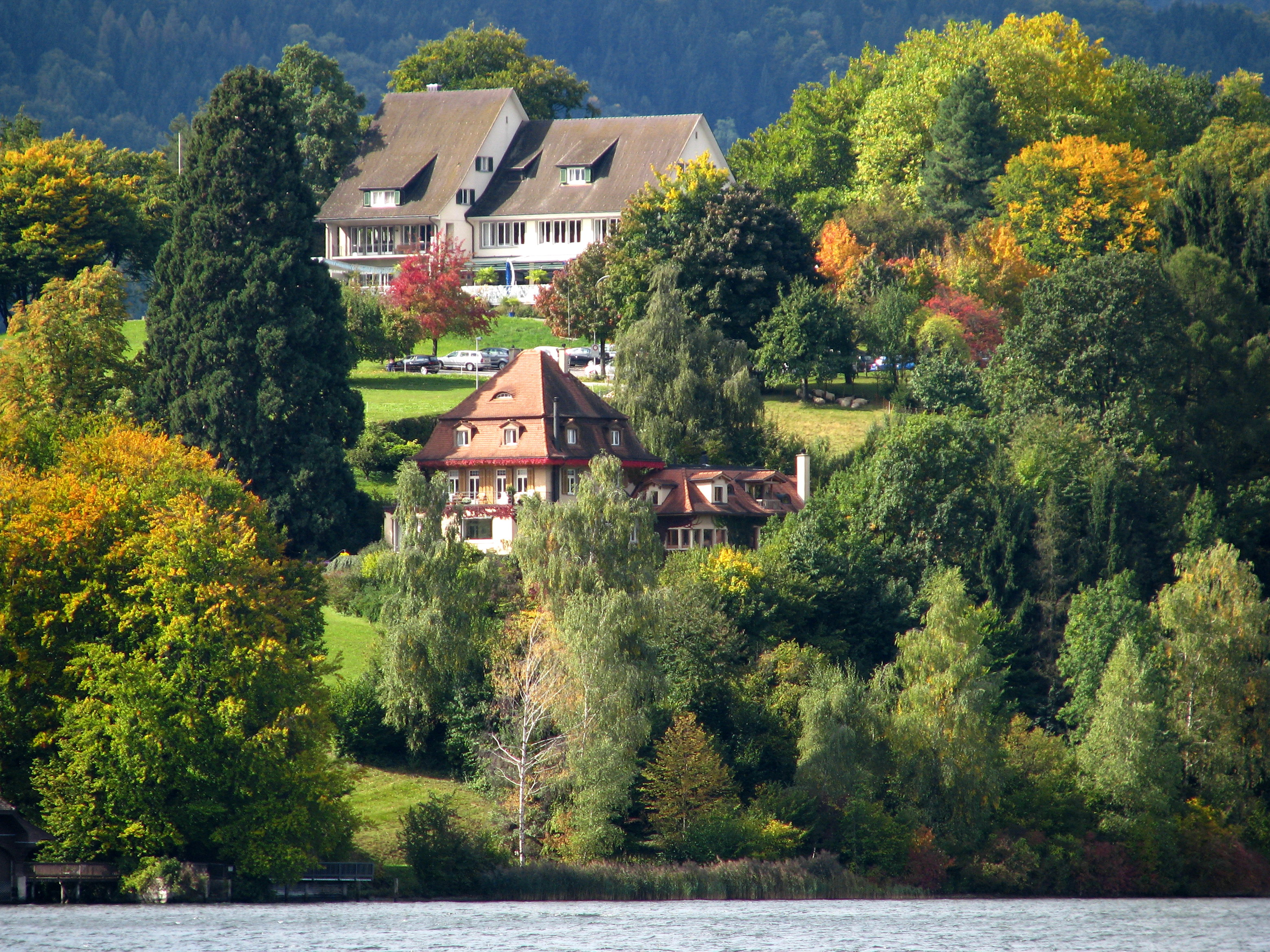
view from the lake on hillside restaurant

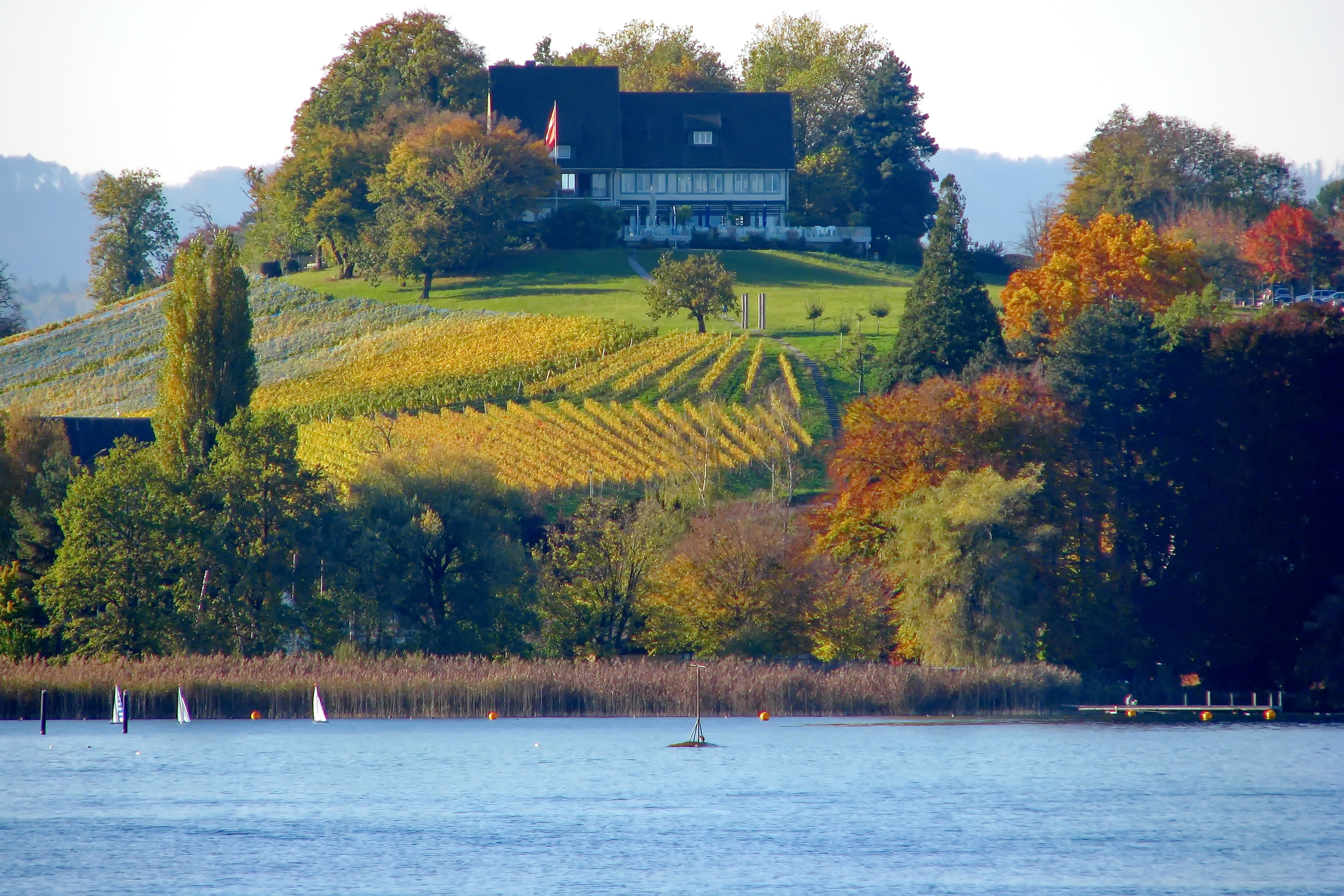
lake shore vineyard of the museum

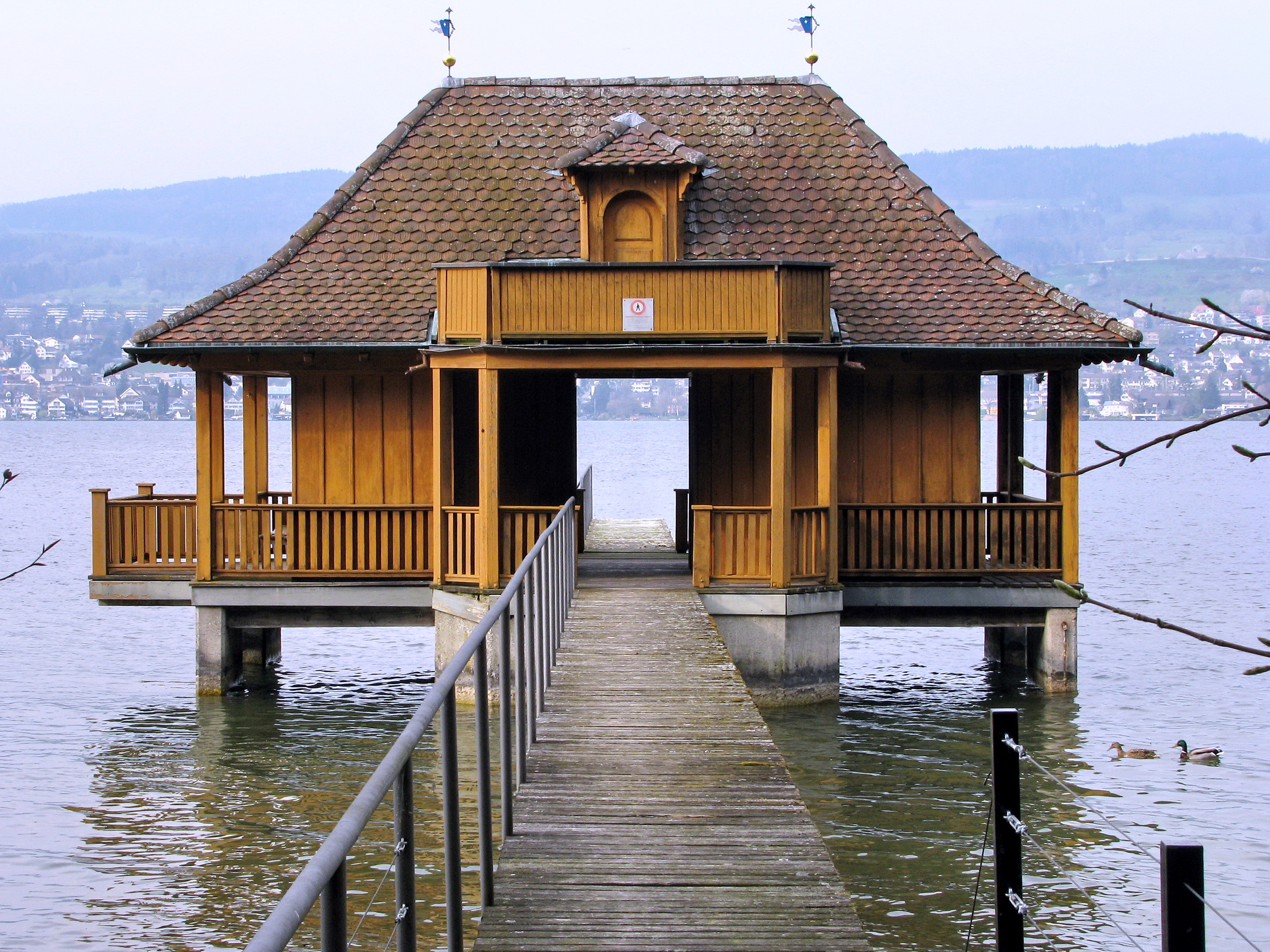
lake shore pavillon

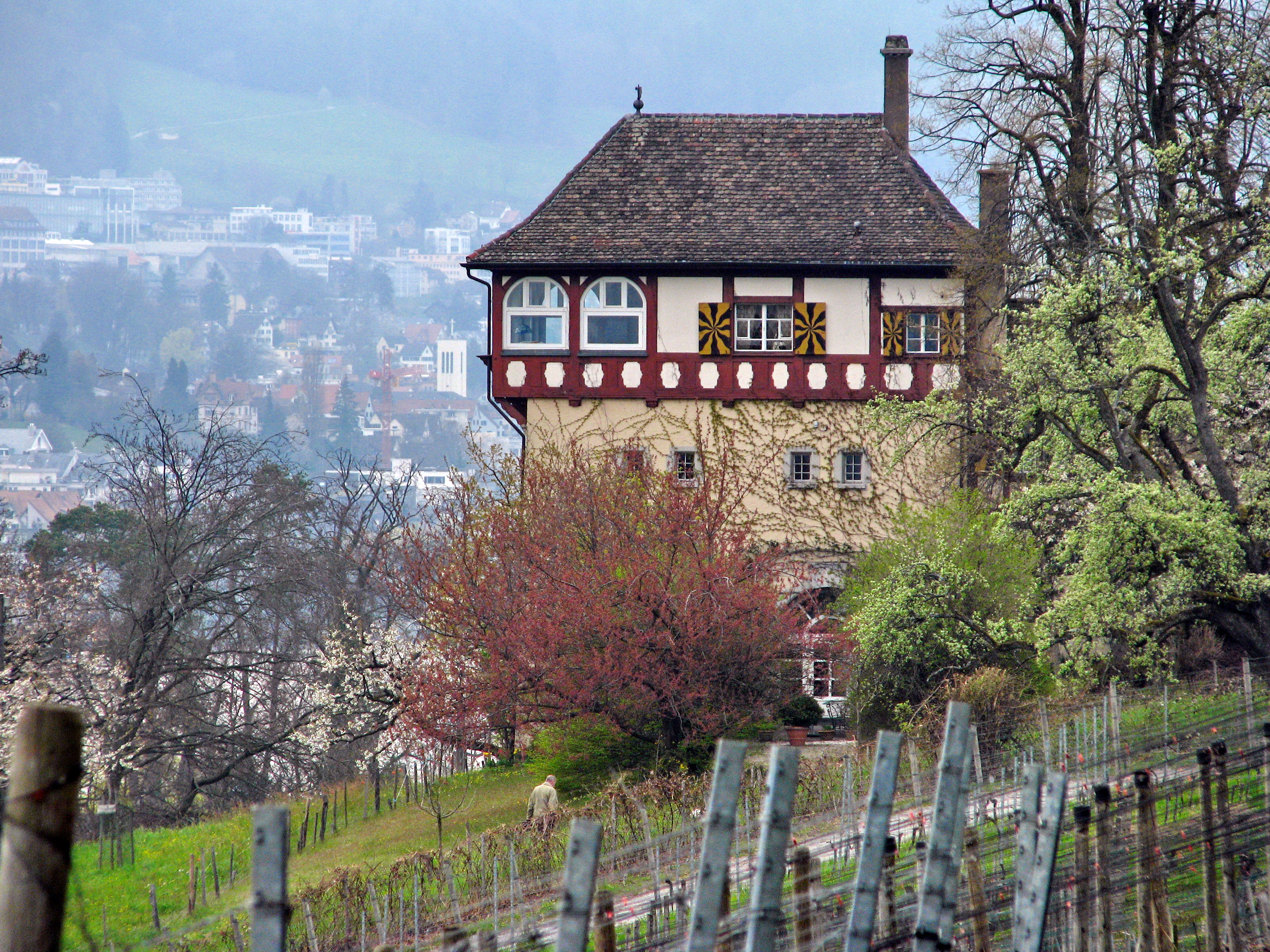
Gugger house

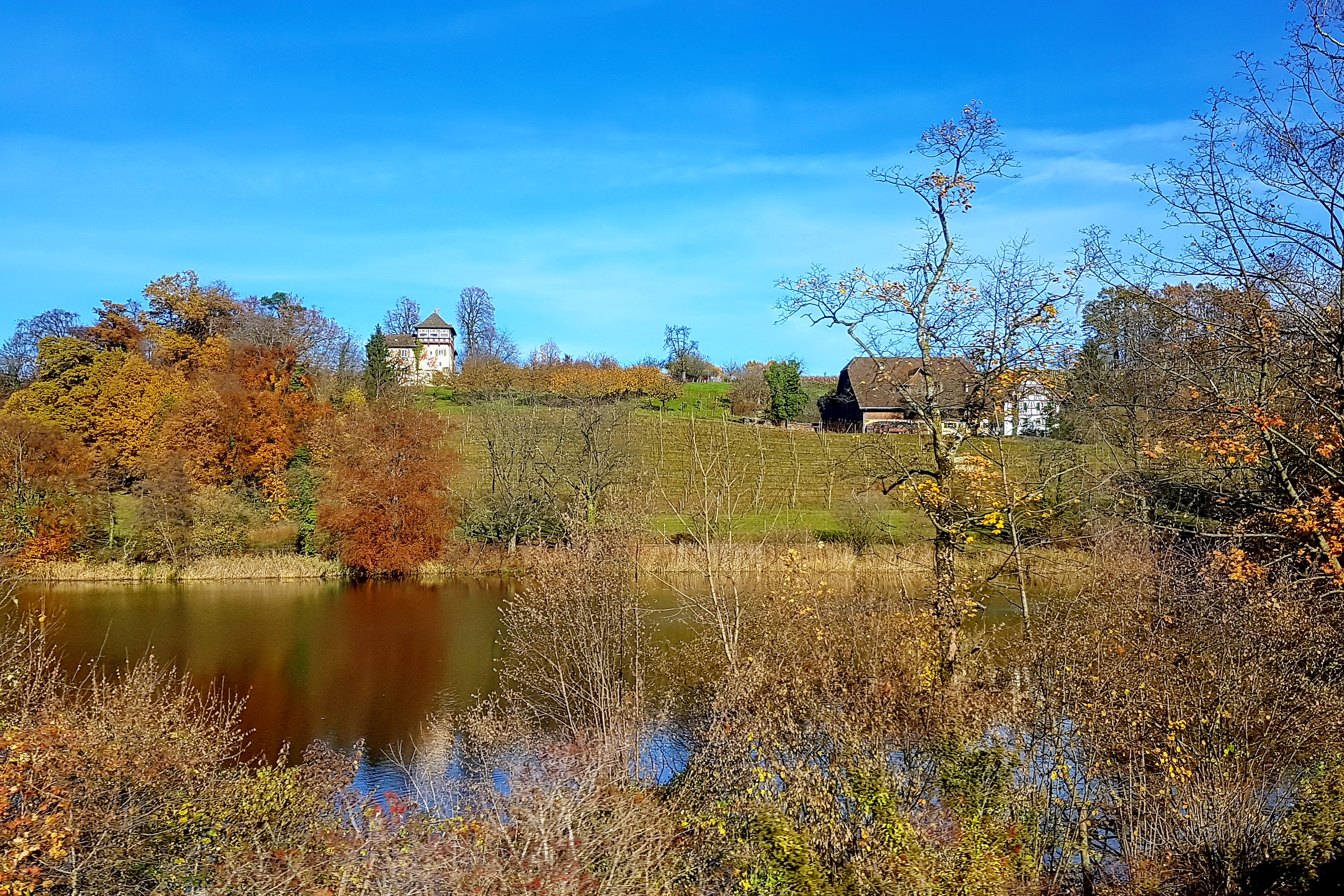
Ausee, the small southern lake

=== Wine museum and vineyard ===
In 1978 the Weinbaumuseum am Zürichsee was opened at the foot of the Au peninsula to allow a fascinating insight into the wine of the region from the beginning to the present. Situated in a converted barn on the edge of the new vineyard of the Zürich University of Applied Sciences (ZHAW), there is also a historic vineyard which is traditionally cultivated and planted with many formerly used varieties.

== Transport ==
Tourist boat trips, run by the Zürichsee-Schifffahrtsgesellschaft (ZSG), sail between Zürich-Bürkliplatz and Rapperswil.

== Cultural heritage ==
Located on Zürichsee lake shore, Wädenswil–Vorder Au is part of the 56 Swiss sites of the UNESCO World Heritage Site Prehistoric pile dwellings around the Alps, and the settlement is also listed in the Swiss inventory of cultural property of national and regional significance as a Class A object of national importance. Because the lake has grown in size over time, the original piles are now around 4 metres (13 ft) to 7 metres (23 ft) under the water level of 406 metres (1,332 ft).

Schloss Au, its auxiliary buildings and the park are listed in the Swiss inventory of cultural property of national and regional significance as a Class B object of regional importance.

== See also ==
- List of peninsulas
