= Au, Zurich =

Au
- Former municipality
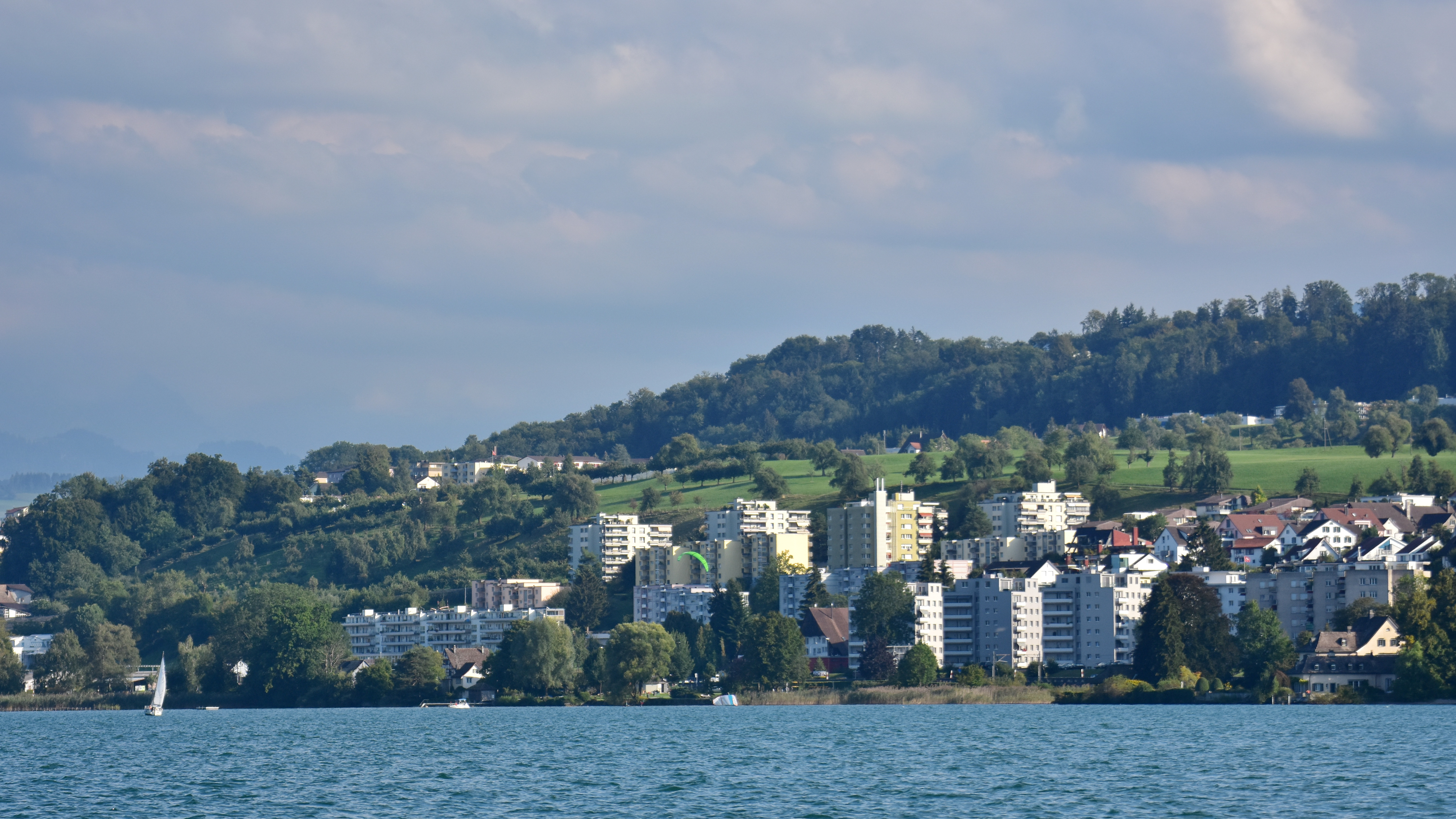
- Au as seen from as seen from Zürichsee-Schifffahrtsgesellschaft (ZSG) ship MS Helvetia on Zürichsee
- Location of Au
- Location within Switzerland Location within Canton of Zürich
- Coordinates: 47°14.46′N 8°38.42′E
- Country: Switzerland
- Canton: Zürich
- District: Horgen
- Municipality: Wädenswil
- Elevation: 408 m (1,339 ft)

Population (2007)
  - Total: 4,979
- Time zone: UTC+01:00 (CET)
  - Summer (DST): UTC+02:00 (CEST)
- Postal code: 8804
- ISO 3166 code: CH-ZH
- Surrounded by: Hirzel, Horgen, Wädenswil
- Website: www.waedenswil.ch

Au (German pronunciation: [aʊ]) is a village in the municipality Wädenswil in the district of Horgen in the canton of Zürich in Switzerland.

First mentioned in the year 1130 as "Naglikon" and in 1316 as "Owe", Au (Lauft) belongs politically to the urban area of the south-eastern city of Wädenswil on Lake Zürich.

== Transport ==
Au ZH railway station is a stop of the S-Bahn Zürich on the line S8. The Au peninsula is a known tourist destination and has a stop on the Zürichsee-Schifffahrtsgesellschaft.

== Cultural heritage ==
Aerial view from 250 m by Walter Mittelholzer (1919)

Located on Zürichsee lakeshore, Wädenswil–Vorder Au is part of the 56 Swiss sites of the UNESCO World Heritage Site Prehistoric pile dwellings around the Alps, and the settlement is also listed in the Swiss inventory of cultural property of national and regional significance as a Class object. Because the lake has grown in size over time, the original piles are now around 4 metres (13 ft) to 7 metres (23 ft) under the water level of 406 metres (1,332 ft).

The Au château, its auxiliary buildings and the park are listed in the Swiss inventory of cultural property of national and regional significance as a Class B object of regional importance.

== Gallery ==
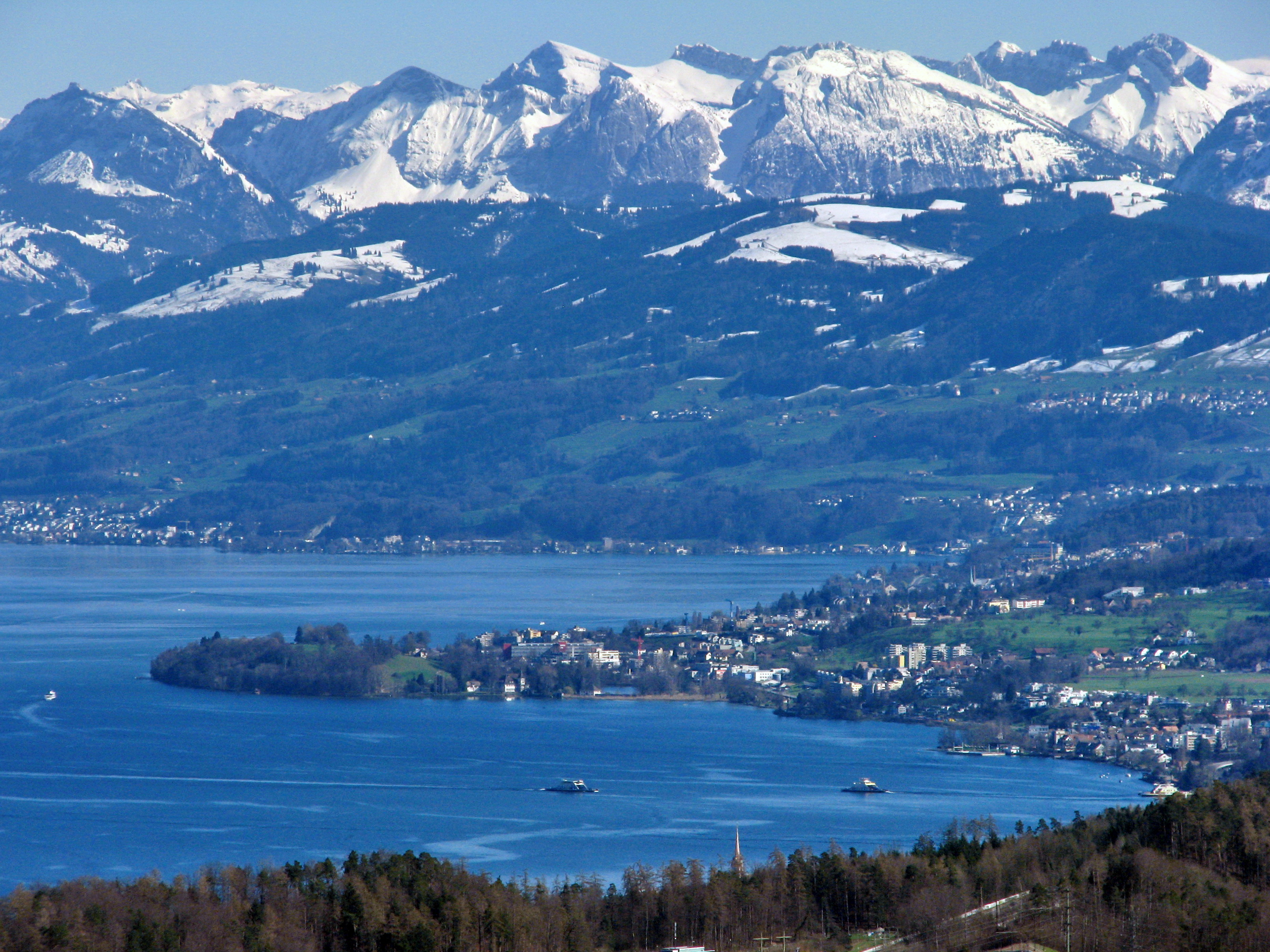
The village of Au and Au peninsula as seen from Felsenegg

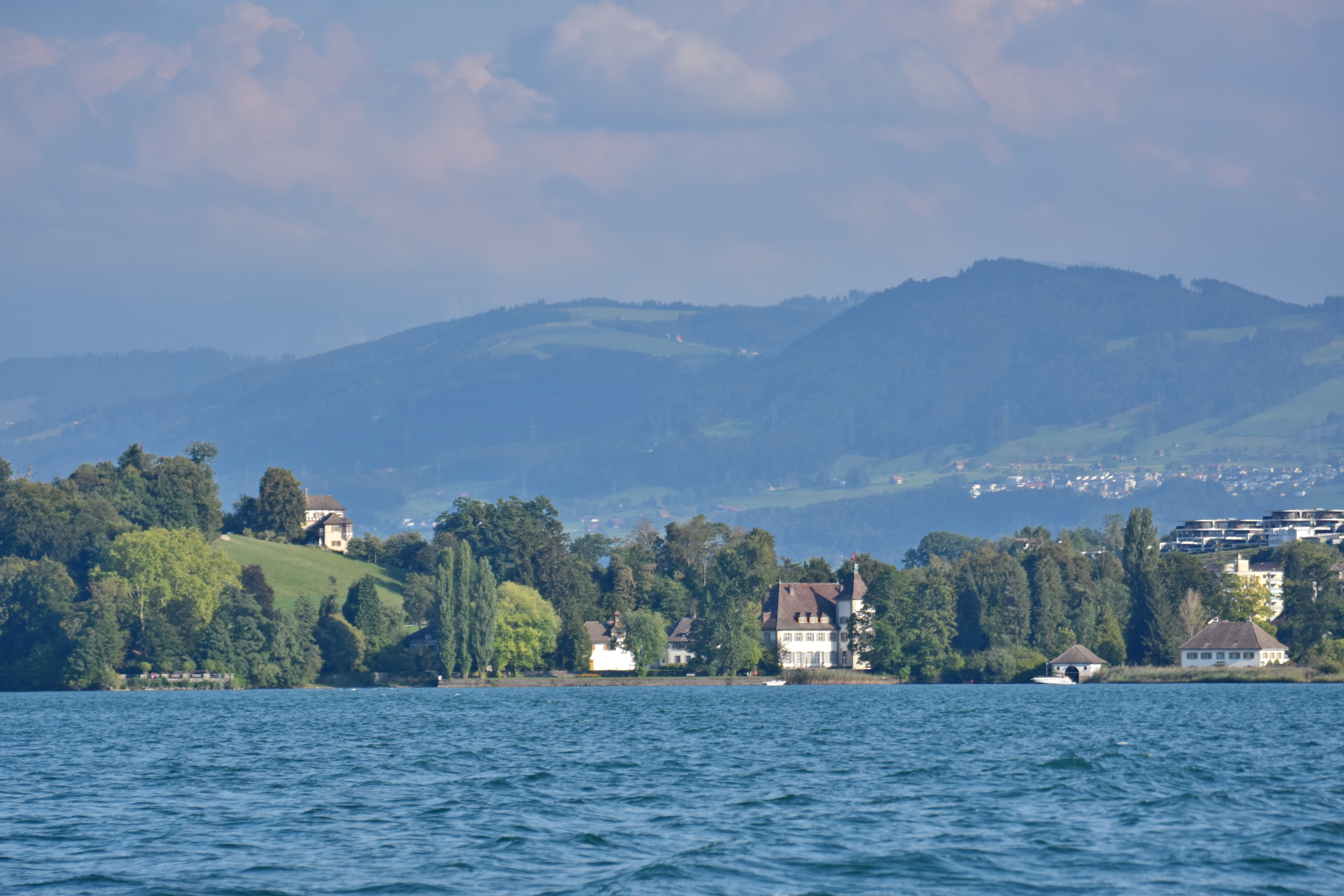
Schloss Au, the former Werdmüller estate on the peninsula
