= 2019 Tour de Suisse =

Cycling race

2019 UCI World Tour, race 26 of 38

Race details
- Dates: 15–23 June 2019
- Stages: 9
- Distance: 1,172.7 km (728.7 mi)
- Winning time: 27h 43' 10"

Results
Jersey awarded to the overall winner	Winner	Egan Bernal (COL)	(Team INEOS)
	Second	Rohan Dennis (AUS)	(Bahrain–Merida)
	Third	Patrick Konrad (AUT)	(Bora–Hansgrohe)
Jersey awarded to the mountains classification winner	Mountains	Hugh Carthy (GBR)	(EF Education First)
Jersey awarded to the young rider classification winner	Young rider	Egan Bernal (COL)	(Team INEOS)
Jersey awarded to the sprints classification winner	Sprints	Peter Sagan (SVK)	(Bora–Hansgrohe)
	Team	Movistar Team	

The 2019 Tour de Suisse was a road cycling stage race that took place between 15 and 23 June 2019 in Switzerland. It was the 83rd edition of the Tour de Suisse and the 26th race of the 2019 UCI World Tour.

== Teams ==
In total, twenty-one teams started the race, with each team having seven riders.

UCI WorldTeams

- AG2R La Mondiale
- Astana
- Bahrain–Merida
- Bora–Hansgrohe
- CCC Team
- Deceuninck–Quick-Step
- EF Education First
- Groupama–FDJ
- Team Katusha–Alpecin
- Lotto–Soudal
- Mitchelton–Scott
- Movistar Team
- Team Dimension Data
- Team Jumbo–Visma
- Team Sunweb
- Trek–Segafredo
- UAE Team Emirates
- Team INEOS

UCI Professional Continental teams

- Human Powered Health
- Team TotalEnergies

National teams

- Switzerland

== Pre-race favourites ==
Before the start of the race, Geraint Thomas was the favourite to win, with his teammate Egan Bernal as the second favourite. From the rest of the field, Enric Mas, Rui Costa and Marc Soler were considered as the nearest rivals.

== Route ==
Stage characteristics and winners
Stage	Date	Route	Distance	Type	Winner
1	15 June	Langnau im Emmental to Langnau im Emmental	9.5 km (5.9 mi)	Individual time trial	Rohan Dennis (AUS)
2	16 June	Langnau im Emmental to Langnau im Emmental	159.6 km (99.2 mi)	Hilly stage	Luis León Sánchez (SPA)
3	17 June	Flamatt to Murten	162.3 km (100.8 mi)	Flat stage	Peter Sagan (SVK)
4	18 June	Murten to Arlesheim	163.9 km (101.8 mi)	Hilly stage	Elia Viviani (ITA)
5	19 June	Münchenstein to Einsiedeln	177 km (110.0 mi)	Hilly stage	Elia Viviani (ITA)
6	20 June	Einsiedeln to Flumserberg	120.2 km (74.7 mi)	Medium Mountain stage	Antwan Tolhoek (NED)
7	21 June	Unterterzen to San Gottardo	216.6 km (134.6 mi)	Mountain stage	Egan Bernal (COL)
8	22 June	Goms to Goms	19.2 km (11.9 mi)	Individual time trial	Yves Lampaert (BEL)
9	23 June	Goms to Goms	101.5 km (63.1 mi)	Mountain stage	Hugh Carthy (GBR)
Total			1,172.7 km (728.7 mi)		

== Stages ==
=== Stage 1 ===
15 June 2019 — Langnau im Emmental to Langnau im Emmental, 9.5 km (5.9 mi) (Individual time trial)

Stage 1 Result
Rank	Rider	Team	Time
1	Rohan Dennis (AUS)	Bahrain–Merida	10' 50"
2	Maciej Bodnar (POL)	Bora–Hansgrohe	+ 0"
3	Michael Matthews (AUS)	Team Sunweb	+ 1"
4	Søren Kragh Andersen (DEN)	Team Sunweb	+ 2"
5	Kasper Asgreen (DEN)	Deceuninck–Quick-Step	+ 2"
6	Lawson Craddock (USA)	EF Education First	+ 5"
7	Peter Sagan (SVK)	Bora–Hansgrohe	+ 7"
8	Patrick Bevin (NZL)	CCC Team	+ 8"
9	Stefan Küng (SUI)	Groupama–FDJ	+ 9"
10	Tom Scully (NZL)	EF Education First	+ 11"

General Classification after Stage 1
Rank	Rider	Team	Time
1	Rohan Dennis (AUS)	Bahrain–Merida	10' 50"
2	Maciej Bodnar (POL)	Bora–Hansgrohe	+ 0"
3	Michael Matthews (AUS)	Team Sunweb	+ 1"
4	Søren Kragh Andersen (DEN)	Team Sunweb	+ 2"
5	Kasper Asgreen (DEN)	Deceuninck–Quick-Step	+ 2"
6	Lawson Craddock (USA)	EF Education First	+ 5"
7	Peter Sagan (SVK)	Bora–Hansgrohe	+ 7"
8	Patrick Bevin (NZL)	CCC Team	+ 8"
9	Stefan Küng (SUI)	Groupama–FDJ	+ 9"
10	Tom Scully (NZL)	EF Education First	+ 11"

=== Stage 2 ===
16 June 2019 — Langnau im Emmental to Langnau im Emmental, 159.6 km (99.2 mi)

Stage 2 Result
Rank	Rider	Team	Time
1	Luis León Sánchez (ESP)	Astana	4h 01' 21"
2	Peter Sagan (SVK)	Bora–Hansgrohe	+ 6"
3	Matteo Trentin (ITA)	Mitchelton–Scott	+ 6"
4	Kasper Asgreen (DEN)	Deceuninck–Quick-Step	+ 6"
5	Greg Van Avermaet (BEL)	CCC Team	+ 6"
6	Michael Matthews (AUS)	Team Sunweb	+ 6"
7	Omar Fraile (ESP)	Astana	+ 6"
8	Sven Erik Bystrøm (NOR)	UAE Team Emirates	+ 6"
9	Nathan Haas (AUS)	Team Katusha–Alpecin	+ 6"
10	Ben Swift (GBR)	Team INEOS	+ 6"

General Classification after Stage 2
Rank	Rider	Team	Time
1	Kasper Asgreen (DEN)	Deceuninck–Quick-Step	4h 12' 16"
2	Peter Sagan (SVK)	Bora–Hansgrohe	+ 0"
3	Rohan Dennis (AUS)	Bahrain–Merida	+ 1"
4	Michael Matthews (AUS)	Team Sunweb	+ 1"
5	Lawson Craddock (USA)	EF Education First	+ 6"
6	Stefan Küng (SUI)	Groupama–FDJ	+ 10"
7	Matteo Trentin (ITA)	Mitchelton–Scott	+ 17"
8	Geraint Thomas (GBR)	Team INEOS	+ 18"
9	Jonathan Castroviejo (ESP)	Team INEOS	+ 19"
10	Yves Lampaert (BEL)	Deceuninck–Quick-Step	+ 19"

=== Stage 3 ===
17 June 2019 — Flamatt to Murten, 162.3 km (100.8 mi)

Stage 3 Result
Rank	Rider	Team	Time
1	Peter Sagan (SVK)	Bora–Hansgrohe	3h 39' 25"
2	Elia Viviani (ITA)	Deceuninck–Quick-Step	+ 0"
3	John Degenkolb (GER)	Trek–Segafredo	+ 0"
4	Iván García Cortina (ESP)	Bahrain–Merida	+ 0"
5	Ben Swift (GBR)	Team INEOS	+ 0"
6	Michael Matthews (AUS)	Team Sunweb	+ 0"
7	Reinardt Janse van Rensburg (SAF)	Team Dimension Data	+ 0"
8	Fabian Lienhard (SUI)	Switzerland	+ 0"
9	Thomas Boudat (FRA)	Total Direct Énergie	+ 0"
10	Daniel Hoelgaard (NOR)	Groupama–FDJ	+ 0"

General Classification after Stage 3
Rank	Rider	Team	Time
1	Peter Sagan (SVK)	Bora–Hansgrohe	7h 51' 31"
2	Kasper Asgreen (DEN)	Deceuninck–Quick-Step	+ 10"
3	Rohan Dennis (AUS)	Bahrain–Merida	+ 11"
4	Michael Matthews (AUS)	Team Sunweb	+ 11"
5	Lawson Craddock (USA)	EF Education First	+ 16"
6	Stefan Küng (SUI)	Groupama–FDJ	+ 20"
7	Matteo Trentin (ITA)	Mitchelton–Scott	+ 27"
8	Geraint Thomas (GBR)	Team INEOS	+ 28"
9	Jonathan Castroviejo (ESP)	Team INEOS	+ 29"
10	Luis León Sánchez (ESP)	Astana	+ 29"

=== Stage 4 ===
18 June 2019 — Murten to Arlesheim, 163.9 km (101.8 mi)

Geraint Thomas, the pre-race favourite, crashed during the stage and abandoned the race.

Stage 4 Result
Rank	Rider	Team	Time
1	Elia Viviani (ITA)	Deceuninck–Quick-Step	3h 46' 02"
2	Michael Matthews (AUS)	Team Sunweb	+ 0"
3	Peter Sagan (SVK)	Bora–Hansgrohe	+ 0"
4	Matteo Trentin (ITA)	Mitchelton–Scott	+ 0"
5	Jasper Stuyven (BEL)	Trek–Segafredo	+ 0"
6	Sep Vanmarcke (BEL)	EF Education First	+ 0"
7	Reinardt Janse van Rensburg (SAF)	Team Dimension Data	+ 0"
8	Iván García Cortina (ESP)	Bahrain–Merida	+ 0"
9	Stan Dewulf (BEL)	Lotto–Soudal	+ 0"
10	Fabian Lienhard (SUI)	Switzerland	+ 0"

General Classification after Stage 4
Rank	Rider	Team	Time
1	Peter Sagan (SVK)	Bora–Hansgrohe	11h 37' 28"
2	Michael Matthews (AUS)	Team Sunweb	+ 10"
3	Kasper Asgreen (DEN)	Deceuninck–Quick-Step	+ 15"
4	Rohan Dennis (AUS)	Bahrain–Merida	+ 16"
5	Lawson Craddock (USA)	EF Education First	+ 21"
6	Stefan Küng (SUI)	Groupama–FDJ	+ 25"
7	Matteo Trentin (ITA)	Mitchelton–Scott	+ 32"
8	Patrick Konrad (AUT)	Bora–Hansgrohe	+ 33"
9	Jonathan Castroviejo (ESP)	Team INEOS	+ 34"
10	Luis León Sánchez (ESP)	Astana	+ 34"

=== Stage 5 ===
19 June 2019 — Münchenstein to Einsiedeln, 177 km (110 mi)

Stage 5 Result
Rank	Rider	Team	Time
1	Elia Viviani (ITA)	Deceuninck–Quick-Step	4h 18' 26"
2	Peter Sagan (SVK)	Bora–Hansgrohe	+ 0"
3	Jasper Stuyven (BEL)	Trek–Segafredo	+ 0"
4	Matteo Trentin (ITA)	Mitchelton–Scott	+ 0"
5	Michael Matthews (AUS)	Team Sunweb	+ 0"
6	Alexander Kristoff (NOR)	UAE Team Emirates	+ 0"
7	Fabian Lienhard (SUI)	Switzerland	+ 0"
8	Stan Dewulf (BEL)	Lotto–Soudal	+ 0"
9	Reinardt Janse van Rensburg (SAF)	Team Dimension Data	+ 0"
10	Patrick Bevin (NZL)	CCC Team	+ 0"

General Classification after Stage 5
Rank	Rider	Team	Time
1	Peter Sagan (SVK)	Bora–Hansgrohe	15h 55' 48"
2	Michael Matthews (AUS)	Team Sunweb	+ 14"
3	Kasper Asgreen (DEN)	Deceuninck–Quick-Step	+ 21"
4	Rohan Dennis (AUS)	Bahrain–Merida	+ 22"
5	Lawson Craddock (USA)	EF Education First	+ 27"
6	Matteo Trentin (ITA)	Mitchelton–Scott	+ 38"
7	Patrick Konrad (AUT)	Bora–Hansgrohe	+ 39"
8	Jonathan Castroviejo (ESP)	Team INEOS	+ 40"
9	Luis León Sánchez (ESP)	Astana	+ 40"
10	Winner Anacona (COL)	Movistar Team	+ 40"

=== Stage 6 ===
20 June 2019 — Einsiedeln to Flumserberg, 120.2 km (74.7 mi)

Stage 6 Result
Rank	Rider	Team	Time
1	Antwan Tolhoek (NED)	Team Jumbo–Visma	2h 43' 34"
2	Egan Bernal (COL)	Team INEOS	+ 17"
3	François Bidard (FRA)	AG2R La Mondiale	+ 24"
4	Jan Hirt (CZE)	Astana	+ 29"
5	Domenico Pozzovivo (ITA)	Bahrain–Merida	+ 31"
6	Patrick Bevin (NZL)	CCC Team	+ 38"
7	Rui Costa (POR)	UAE Team Emirates	+ 44"
8	Tiesj Benoot (BEL)	Lotto–Soudal	+ 44"
9	Patrick Schelling (SUI)	Switzerland	+ 46"
10	Patrick Konrad (AUT)	Bora–Hansgrohe	+ 46"

General Classification after Stage 6
Rank	Rider	Team	Time
1	Egan Bernal (COL)	Team INEOS	18h 40' 18"
2	Rohan Dennis (AUS)	Bahrain–Merida	+ 12"
3	Patrick Konrad (AUT)	Bora–Hansgrohe	+ 29"
4	Jan Hirt (CZE)	Astana	+ 35"
5	Tiesj Benoot (BEL)	Lotto–Soudal	+ 35"
6	Marc Soler (ESP)	Movistar Team	+ 41"
7	Domenico Pozzovivo (ITA)	Bahrain–Merida	+ 50"
8	François Bidard (FRA)	AG2R La Mondiale	+ 58"
9	Fabio Aru (ITA)	UAE Team Emirates	+ 1' 07"
10	Nicolas Roche (IRL)	Team Sunweb	+ 1' 07"

=== Stage 7 ===
21 June 2019 — Unterterzen to San Gottardo, 216.6 km (134.6 mi)

Stage 7 Result
Rank	Rider	Team	Time
1	Egan Bernal (COL)	Team INEOS	5h 37' 40"
2	Domenico Pozzovivo (ITA)	Bahrain–Merida	+ 23"
3	Rohan Dennis (AUS)	Bahrain–Merida	+ 23"
4	Patrick Konrad (AUT)	Bora–Hansgrohe	+ 34"
5	Jan Hirt (CZE)	Astana	+ 34"
6	Tiesj Benoot (BEL)	Lotto–Soudal	+ 34"
7	Enric Mas (ESP)	Deceuninck–Quick-Step	+ 40"
8	Simon Špilak (SLO)	Team Katusha–Alpecin	+ 50"
9	Lennard Kämna (GER)	Team Sunweb	+ 1' 03"
10	Fabio Aru (ITA)	UAE Team Emirates	+ 1' 03"

General Classification after Stage 7
Rank	Rider	Team	Time
1	Egan Bernal (COL)	Team INEOS	24h 17' 48"
2	Rohan Dennis (AUS)	Bahrain–Merida	+ 41"
3	Patrick Konrad (AUT)	Bora–Hansgrohe	+ 1' 13"
4	Domenico Pozzovivo (ITA)	Bahrain–Merida	+ 1' 17"
5	Jan Hirt (CZE)	Astana	+ 1' 19"
6	Tiesj Benoot (BEL)	Lotto–Soudal	+ 1' 19"
7	Enric Mas (ESP)	Deceuninck–Quick-Step	+ 2' 07"
8	Fabio Aru (ITA)	UAE Team Emirates	+ 2' 20"
9	Nicolas Roche (IRL)	Team Sunweb	+ 2' 23"
10	Simon Špilak (SLO)	Team Katusha–Alpecin	+ 2' 26"

=== Stage 8 ===
22 June 2019 — Goms to Goms, 19.2 km (11.9 mi) (Individual time trial)

Stage 8 Result
Rank	Rider	Team	Time
1	Yves Lampaert (BEL)	Deceuninck–Quick-Step	21' 58"
2	Kasper Asgreen (DEN)	Deceuninck–Quick-Step	+ 5"
3	Søren Kragh Andersen (DEN)	Team Sunweb	+ 10"
4	Tom Scully (NZL)	EF Education First	+ 13"
5	Patrick Bevin (NZL)	CCC Team	+ 13"
6	Rohan Dennis (AUS)	Bahrain–Merida	+ 19"
7	Stefan Küng (SUI)	Groupama–FDJ	+ 20"
8	Benjamin Thomas (FRA)	Groupama–FDJ	+ 32"
9	Nikias Arndt (GER)	Team Sunweb	+ 34"
10	Matteo Trentin (ITA)	Mitchelton–Scott	+ 36"

General Classification after Stage 8
Rank	Rider	Team	Time
1	Egan Bernal (COL)	Team INEOS	24h 40' 24"
2	Rohan Dennis (AUS)	Bahrain–Merida	+ 22"
3	Patrick Konrad (AUT)	Bora–Hansgrohe	+ 1' 46"
4	Tiesj Benoot (BEL)	Lotto–Soudal	+ 1' 54"
5	Jan Hirt (CZE)	Astana	+ 1' 55"
6	Enric Mas (ESP)	Deceuninck–Quick-Step	+ 2' 43"
7	Simon Špilak (SLO)	Team Katusha–Alpecin	+ 2' 53"
8	Domenico Pozzovivo (ITA)	Bahrain–Merida	+ 2' 56"
9	Carlos Betancur (COL)	Movistar Team	+ 3' 17"
10	Nicolas Roche (IRL)	Team Sunweb	+ 3' 17"

=== Stage 9 ===
23 June 2019 — Ulrichen to Ulrichen, 101.5 km (63.1 mi)

Stage 9 Result
Rank	Rider	Team	Time
1	Hugh Carthy (GBR)	EF Education First	3h 01' 49"
2	Rohan Dennis (AUS)	Bahrain–Merida	+ 1' 02"
3	Egan Bernal (COL)	Team INEOS	+ 1' 02"
4	Mathias Frank (SUI)	AG2R La Mondiale	+ 1' 52"
5	Simon Špilak (SLO)	Team Katusha–Alpecin	+ 1' 52"
6	Carlos Betancur (COL)	Movistar Team	+ 2' 15"
7	Tiesj Benoot (BEL)	Lotto–Soudal	+ 2' 15"
8	Domenico Pozzovivo (ITA)	Bahrain–Merida	+ 2' 15"
9	Patrick Konrad (AUT)	Bora–Hansgrohe	+ 2' 15"
10	Jan Hirt (CZE)	Astana	+ 2' 15"

Final general classification
Rank	Rider	Team	Time
1	Egan Bernal (COL)	Team INEOS	27h 43' 10"
2	Rohan Dennis (AUS)	Bahrain–Merida	+ 19"
3	Patrick Konrad (AUT)	Bora–Hansgrohe	+ 3' 04"
4	Tiesj Benoot (BEL)	Lotto–Soudal	+ 3' 12"
5	Jan Hirt (CZE)	Astana	+ 3' 13"
6	Simon Špilak (SLO)	Team Katusha–Alpecin	+ 3' 48"
7	Domenico Pozzovivo (ITA)	Bahrain–Merida	+ 4' 14"
8	Carlos Betancur (COL)	Movistar Team	+ 4' 35"
9	Enric Mas (ESP)	Deceuninck–Quick-Step	+ 4' 53"
10	Nicolas Roche (IRL)	Team Sunweb	+ 5' 27"

== Classification leadership table ==
Classification leadership by stage
Stage	Winner	General classification	Points classification	Mountains classification	Young rider classification	Team classification
1	Rohan Dennis	Rohan Dennis	Rohan Dennis	Not awarded	Søren Kragh Andersen	Bora–Hansgrohe
2	Luis León Sánchez	Kasper Asgreen	Rohan Dennis	Claudio Imhof	Kasper Asgreen	Team Sunweb
3	Peter Sagan	Peter Sagan	Peter Sagan	Claudio Imhof	Kasper Asgreen	Team Sunweb
4	Elia Viviani	Peter Sagan	Peter Sagan	Claudio Imhof	Kasper Asgreen	Team Sunweb
5	Elia Viviani	Peter Sagan	Peter Sagan	Claudio Imhof	Kasper Asgreen	Team Sunweb
6	Antwan Tolhoek	Egan Bernal	Peter Sagan	Claudio Imhof	Egan Bernal	UAE Team Emirates
7	Egan Bernal	Egan Bernal	Peter Sagan	Egan Bernal	Egan Bernal	Movistar Team
8	Yves Lampaert	Egan Bernal	Peter Sagan	Egan Bernal	Egan Bernal	Movistar Team
9	Hugh Carthy	Egan Bernal	Peter Sagan	Hugh Carthy	Egan Bernal	Movistar Team
Final		Egan Bernal	Peter Sagan	Hugh Carthy	Egan Bernal	Movistar Team

== Final classification standings ==
Legend
Denotes the leader of the general classification
Denotes the leader of the points classification
Denotes the leader of the mountains classification
Denotes the leader of the young rider classification
Denotes the leader of the team classification

=== General classification ===
Final general classification (1-10)
Rank	Rider	Team	Time
1	Egan Bernal (COL)	Team INEOS	27h 43' 10"
2	Rohan Dennis (AUS)	Bahrain–Merida	+ 19"
3	Patrick Konrad (AUT)	Bora–Hansgrohe	+ 3' 04"
4	Tiesj Benoot (BEL)	Lotto–Soudal	+ 3' 12"
5	Jan Hirt (CZE)	Astana	+ 3' 13"
6	Simon Špilak (SLO)	Team Katusha–Alpecin	+ 3' 48"
7	Domenico Pozzovivo (ITA)	Bahrain–Merida	+ 4' 14"
8	Carlos Betancur (COL)	Movistar Team	+ 4' 35"
9	Enric Mas (ESP)	Deceuninck–Quick-Step	+ 4' 53"
10	Nicolas Roche (IRL)	Team Sunweb	+ 5' 27"

=== Points classification ===
Final points classification (1-10)
Rank	Rider	Team	Points
1	Peter Sagan (SVK)	Bora–Hansgrohe	37
2	Elia Viviani (ITA)	Deceuninck–Quick-Step	32
3	Rohan Dennis (AUS)	Bahrain–Merida	28
4	Egan Bernal (COL)	Team INEOS	27
5	Matteo Trentin (ITA)	Mitchelton–Scott	22
6	Hugh Carthy (GBR)	EF Education First	20
7	Kasper Asgreen (DEN)	Deceuninck–Quick-Step	18
8	Luis León Sánchez (ESP)	Astana	12
9	Antwan Tolhoek (NED)	Team Jumbo–Visma	12
10	Domenico Pozzovivo (ITA)	Bahrain–Merida	10

=== Mountains classification ===
Final mountains classification (1-10)
Rank	Rider	Team	Points
1	Hugh Carthy (GBR)	EF Education First	60
2	Egan Bernal (COL)	Team INEOS	40
3	Rohan Dennis (AUS)	Bahrain–Merida	33
4	Lennard Kämna (GER)	Team Sunweb	28
5	Claudio Imhof (SUI)	Switzerland	25
6	Domenico Pozzovivo (ITA)	Bahrain–Merida	21
7	Gavin Mannion (USA)	Rally UHC Cycling	19
8	Koen Bouwman (NED)	Team Jumbo–Visma	18
9	Mathias Frank (SUI)	AG2R La Mondiale	17
10	Simon Špilak (SLO)	Team Katusha–Alpecin	15

=== Young rider classification ===
Final young rider classification (1-10)
Rank	Rider	Team	Time
1	Egan Bernal (COL)	Team INEOS	27h 43' 10"
2	Tiesj Benoot (BEL)	Lotto–Soudal	+ 3' 12"
3	Enric Mas (ESP)	Deceuninck–Quick-Step	+ 4' 53"
4	Aurélien Paret-Peintre (FRA)	AG2R La Mondiale	+ 9' 39"
5	Lennard Kämna (GER)	Team Sunweb	+ 9' 42"
6	Kilian Frankiny (SUI)	Groupama–FDJ	+ 11' 03"
7	Merhawi Kudus (ERI)	Astana	+ 18' 11"
8	Matteo Fabbro (ITA)	Team Katusha–Alpecin	+ 19' 53"
9	Hugh Carthy (GBR)	EF Education First	+ 20' 23"
10	Gino Mäder (SUI)	Team Dimension Data	+ 21' 35"

=== Teams classification ===
Final teams classification (1-10)
Rank	Team	Time
1	(Spain) Movistar Team	83h 32' 29"
2	(United Kingdom) Team INEOS	+ 1' 47"
3	(Germany) Team Sunweb	+ 6' 02"
4	(France) AG2R La Mondiale	+ 11' 17"
5	(Kazakhstan) Astana	+ 15' 55"
6	Switzerland	+ 17' 43"
7	(United Arab Emirates) UAE Team Emirates	+ 19' 05"
8	Bahrain–Merida	+ 21' 07"
9	(United States) Trek–Segafredo	+ 23' 12"
10	(Switzerland) Team Katusha–Alpecin	+ 29' 52"
