= Mols railway station =

Railway station in Switzerland

Mols
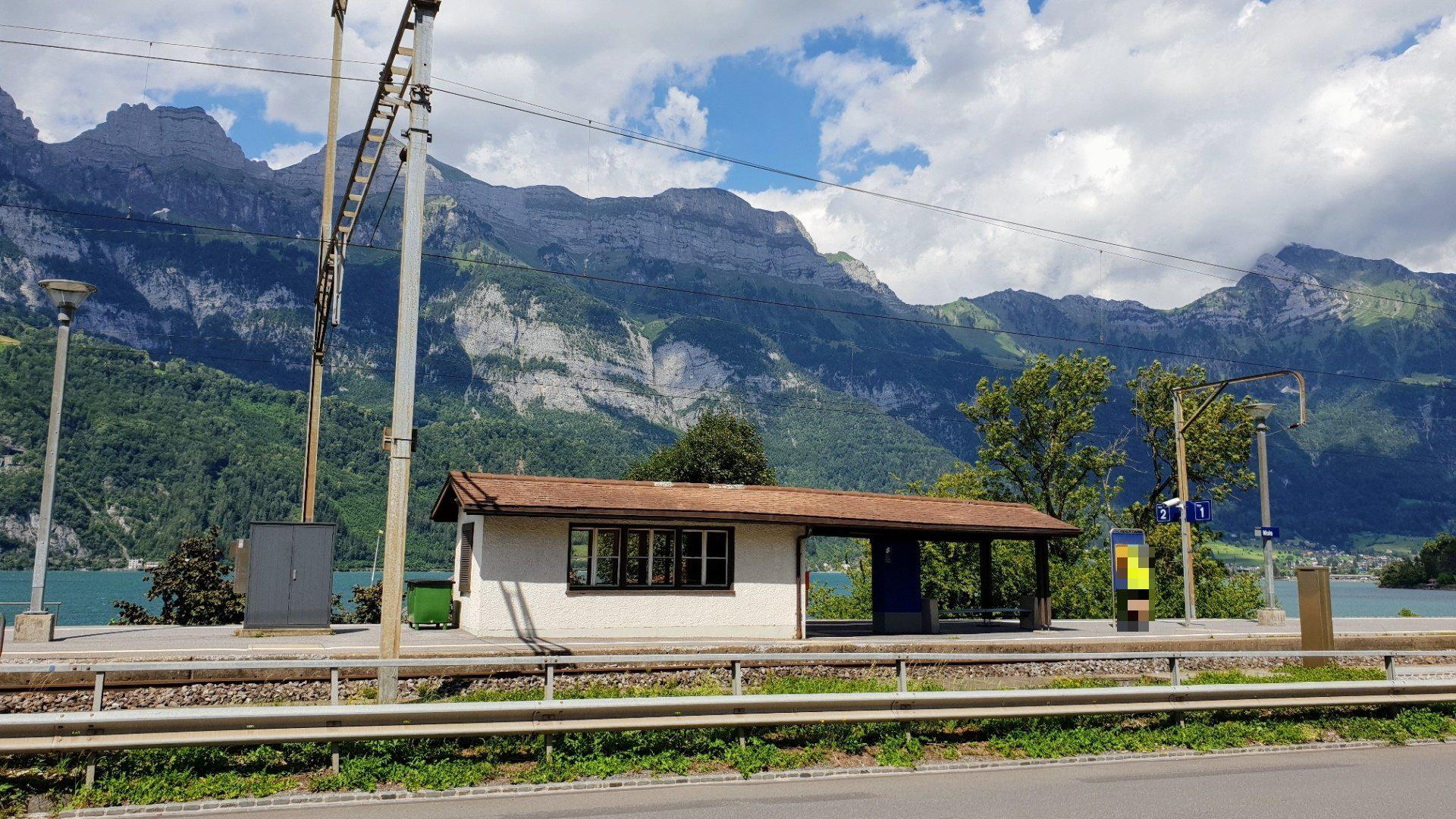
- The station in 2018

General information
- Location: Quarten; Switzerland
- Coordinates: 47°07′N 9°17′E
- Owner: Swiss Federal Railways
- Line: Ziegelbrücke–Sargans line
- Distance: 16.4 km (10.2 mi) from Sargans
- Platforms: 1 island platform
- Tracks: 2
- Connections: Bus Sarganserland Werdenberg; Schiffsbetrieb Walensee

History
- Closed: 12 December 2021
Location
- Location within Switzerland Location within Canton of St. Gallen

Mols railway station (German: Bahnhof Mols) is a now disfunct railway station in Quarten, in the Swiss canton of St. Gallen. The station was closed on 12 December 2021, because of ongoing construction work on the Bommerstein tunnel and low ridership. Buses continue to stop at the station.

The station used to be an intermediate stop of the former S4 circle line (rerouted in December 2023) on the Ziegelbrücke–Sargans line.

== Layout and connections ==
Mols had a 171-metre (561 ft) island platform with two tracks (Nos. 1–2). Bus Sarganserland Werdenberg operates bus services from the station to Walenstadt and Flums. Schiffsbetrieb Walensee operates ferries on the Walensee from a ferry dock adjacent to the former station.

== See also ==
- Ghost station
