= Mühlehorn railway station =

Railway station in Switzerland

Mühlehorn
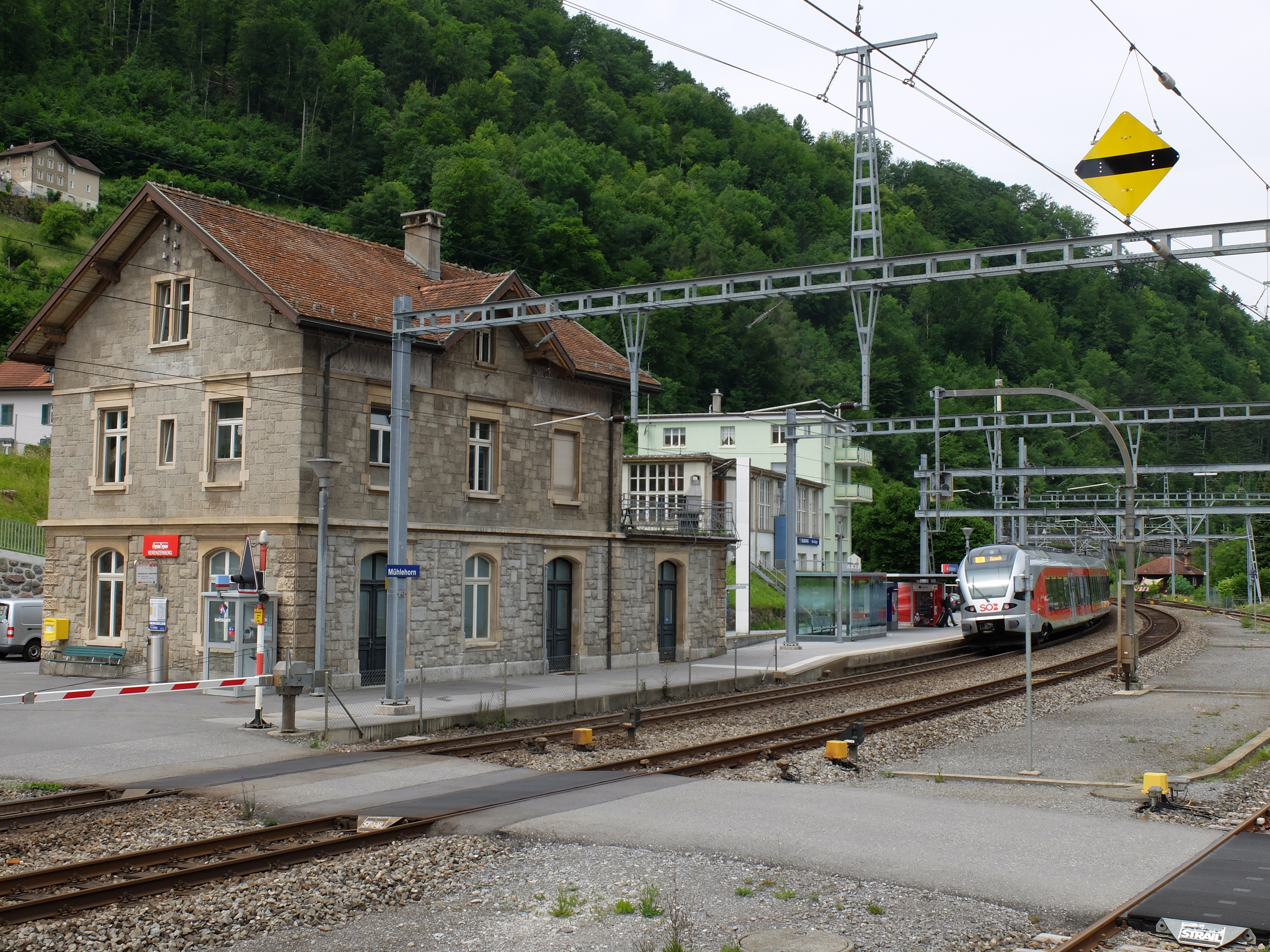
- An S4 service arriving in 2017

General information
- Location: Mühlehorn; Switzerland
- Coordinates: 47°07′N 9°10′E
- Owner: Swiss Federal Railways
- Line: Ziegelbrücke–Sargans line
- Distance: 24.5 km (15.2 mi) from Sargans
- Platforms: 1 side platform
- Tracks: 1
- Train operators: Südostbahn
- Connections: PostAuto Schweiz; Schiffsbetrieb Walensee

Services
Preceding station	St. Gallen S-Bahn	Following station
Ziegelbrücke towards Rapperswil	S17	Murg towards Sargans
Location
- Location within Switzerland Location within Canton of Glarus

Mühlehorn railway station (German: Bahnhof Mühlehorn) is a railway station in Mühlehorn, in the Swiss canton of Glarus. It is an intermediate stop on the Ziegelbrücke–Sargans line.

== Layout and connections ==
Mühlehorn has a 166-metre (545 ft) side platform with a single track (No. 1). PostAuto Schweiz operates bus services from the station to Glarus Nord and Ziegelbrücke. Schiffsbetrieb Walensee operates ferries on the Walensee from a ferry dock across the street from the station.

== Services ==
As of the December 2023 timetable change, the following services stop at Mühlehorn:

- St. Gallen S-Bahn S17: hourly service between Rapperswil and Sargans via Ziegelbrücke.
