= Murg railway station =

Railway station in Switzerland

Murg
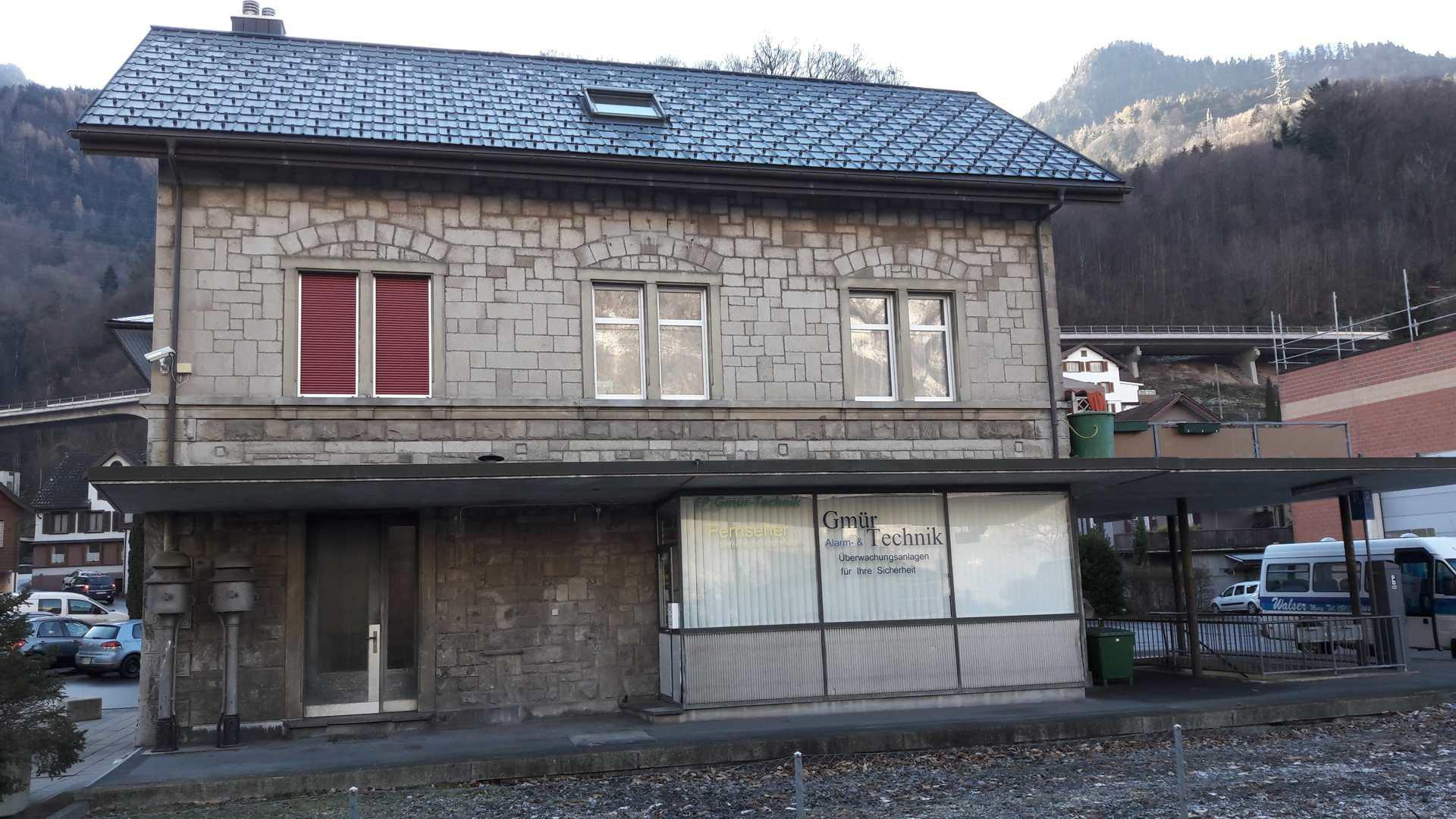
- The station building in 2018

General information
- Location: Quarten; Switzerland
- Coordinates: 47°07′N 9°13′E
- Owner: Swiss Federal Railways
- Line: Ziegelbrücke–Sargans line
- Distance: 21.2 km (13.2 mi) from Sargans
- Platforms: 1 island platform
- Tracks: 2
- Train operators: Südostbahn
- Connections: Bus Sarganserland Werdenberg; Schiffsbetrieb Walensee

Services
Preceding station	St. Gallen S-Bahn	Following station
Mühlehorn towards Rapperswil	S17	Unterterzen towards Sargans
Location
- Location within Switzerland Location within Canton of St. Gallen

Murg railway station (German: Bahnhof Murg) is a railway station in Quarten, in the Swiss canton of St. Gallen. It is an intermediate stop on the Ziegelbrücke–Sargans line. The station is a short walk from the ferry across the Walensee to Quinten.

== Layout and connections ==
Murg has a 200-metre (660 ft) island platform with two tracks (Nos. 1–2). Bus Sarganserland Werdenberg operates bus services from the station to Walenstadt. Schiffsbetrieb Walensee operates ferries on the Walensee from a ferry dock approximately 400 metres (1,300 ft) from the station.

== Services ==
As of the December 2023 timetable change, the following services stop at Murg:

- St. Gallen S-Bahn S17: hourly service between Rapperswil and Sargans via Ziegelbrücke.
