= Mels railway station =

Railway station in Switzerland

Mels
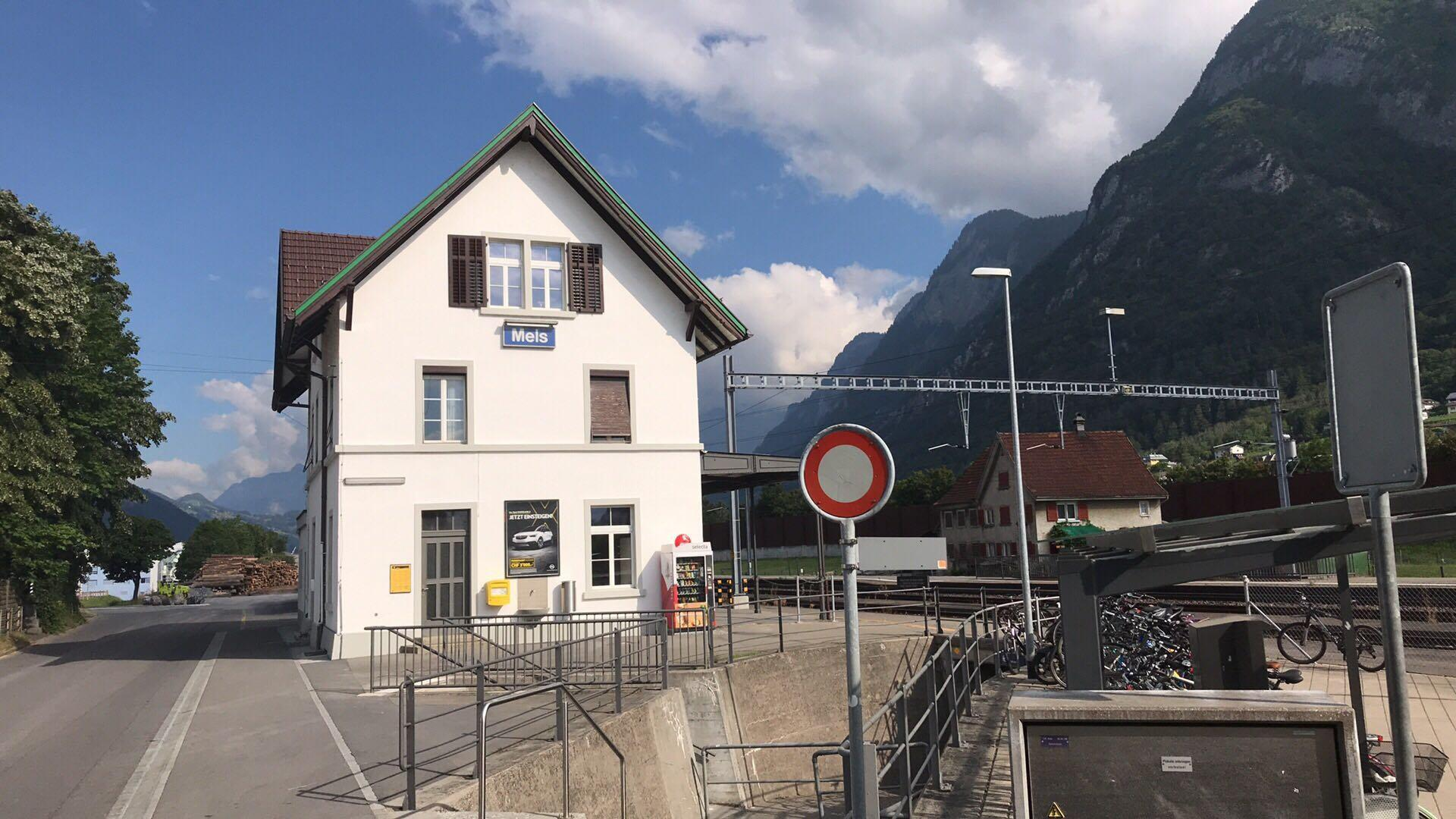
- The station building in 2018

General information
- Location: Mels; Switzerland
- Coordinates: 47°03′N 9°25′E
- Owner: Swiss Federal Railways
- Line: Ziegelbrücke–Sargans line
- Distance: 2.6 km (1.6 mi) from Sargans
- Platforms: 1 island platform
- Tracks: 2
- Train operators: Südostbahn
- Connections: Bus Sarganserland Werdenberg

Services
Preceding station	St. Gallen S-Bahn	Following station
Flums towards Rapperswil	S17	Sargans Terminus
Location
- Location within Switzerland Location within Canton of St. Gallen

Mels railway station (German: Bahnhof Mels) is a railway station in Mels, in the Swiss canton of St. Gallen. It is an intermediate stop on the Ziegelbrücke–Sargans line.

== Services ==
As of the December 2023 timetable change, the following services stop at Mels:

- St. Gallen S-Bahn S17: hourly service between Rapperswil and Sargans via Ziegelbrücke.

== Layout and connections ==
Mels has a single 306-metre (1,004 ft)-long island platform with two tracks (Nos. 3–4). There is a non-passenger side platform located on the south side of the station. Bus Sarganserland Werdenberg operates bus services from the station to Mels and Sargans.
