= Weesen railway station =

Disused railway station in Switzerland

Weesen
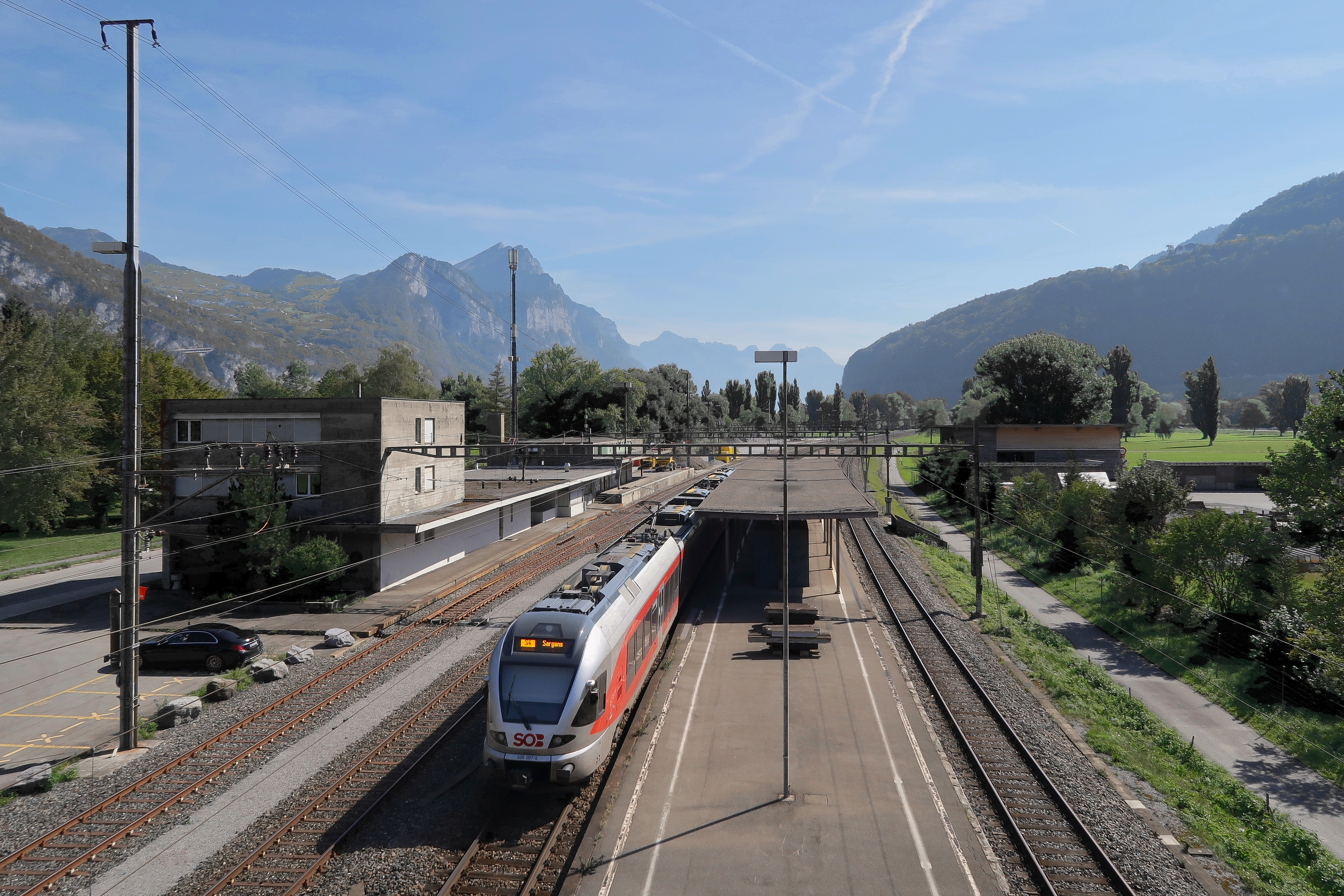
- Former S4 circle line passing through the station in 2018

General information
- Other names: Bahnhof Weesen
- Location: Bahnhofstrasse, Mollis; Switzerland
- Coordinates: 47°07′47.9″N 09°05′40.3″E
- Elevation: 425 m (1,394 ft)
- Operator: Swiss Federal Railways
- Line: Ziegelbrücke–Sargans railway
- Platforms: 1
- Tracks: 3 (German: Gleis)

Construction
- Structure type: at-grade
- Platform levels: 1
Location
- Location within Switzerland Location within Canton of Glarus

Weesen railway station (German: Bahnhof Weesen) was one of two former railway stations serving the town of Weesen in the Swiss canton of St. Gallen, but which was located in the municipality of Glarus Nord (formerly Mollis) in the canton of Glarus on the other side of the Linth canal, which corresponds to the cantonal boundary. It was a station on the Ziegelbrücke–Sargans railway line between Ziegelbrücke and Mühlehorn. After its opening in 1969, the station has been disused since the 2013 timetable change due to the introduction of the St. Gallen S-Bahn, though it briefly reopenened during the ESAF 2025 in Mollis. A bus route links Weesen with Ziegelbrücke station.

Between 1875 and 1969, a railway loop from Ziegelbrücke to Näfels-Mollis existed to the west of Weesen, which contained a railway station of that name. Service over this loop, built by the United Swiss Railways (Vereinigte Schweizerbahnen, VSB), terminated when the line from Ziegelbrücke to Murg was straightened, and the new station on the other side of the Linth canal was built.

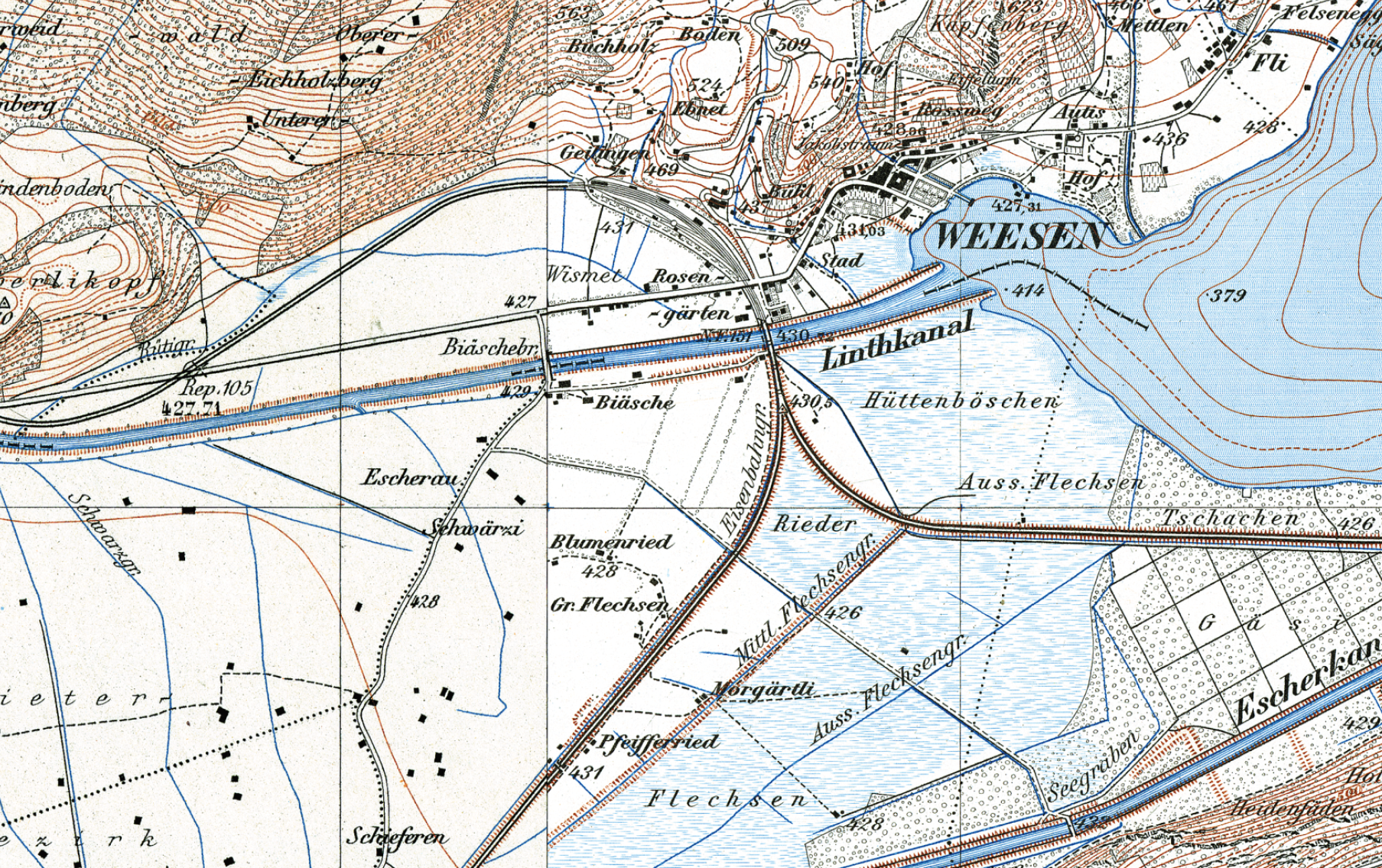
First Weesen railway station, located west of the town, on the VSB loop

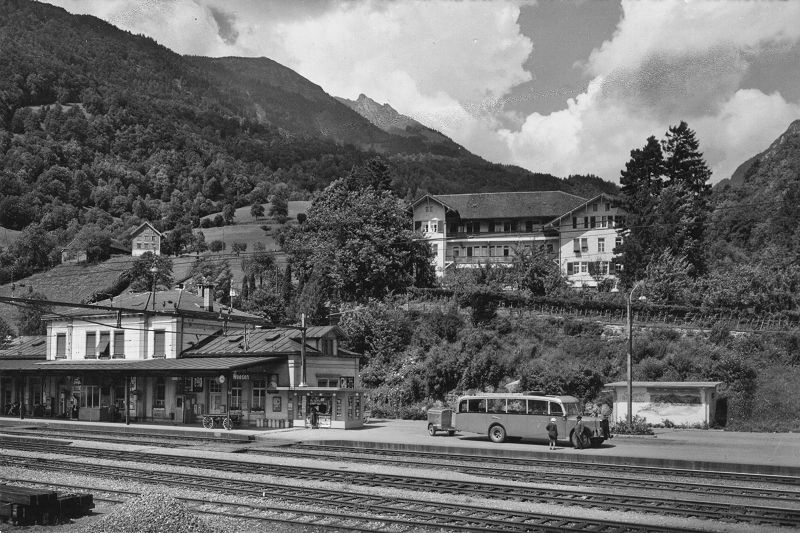
First Weesen railway station in 1958

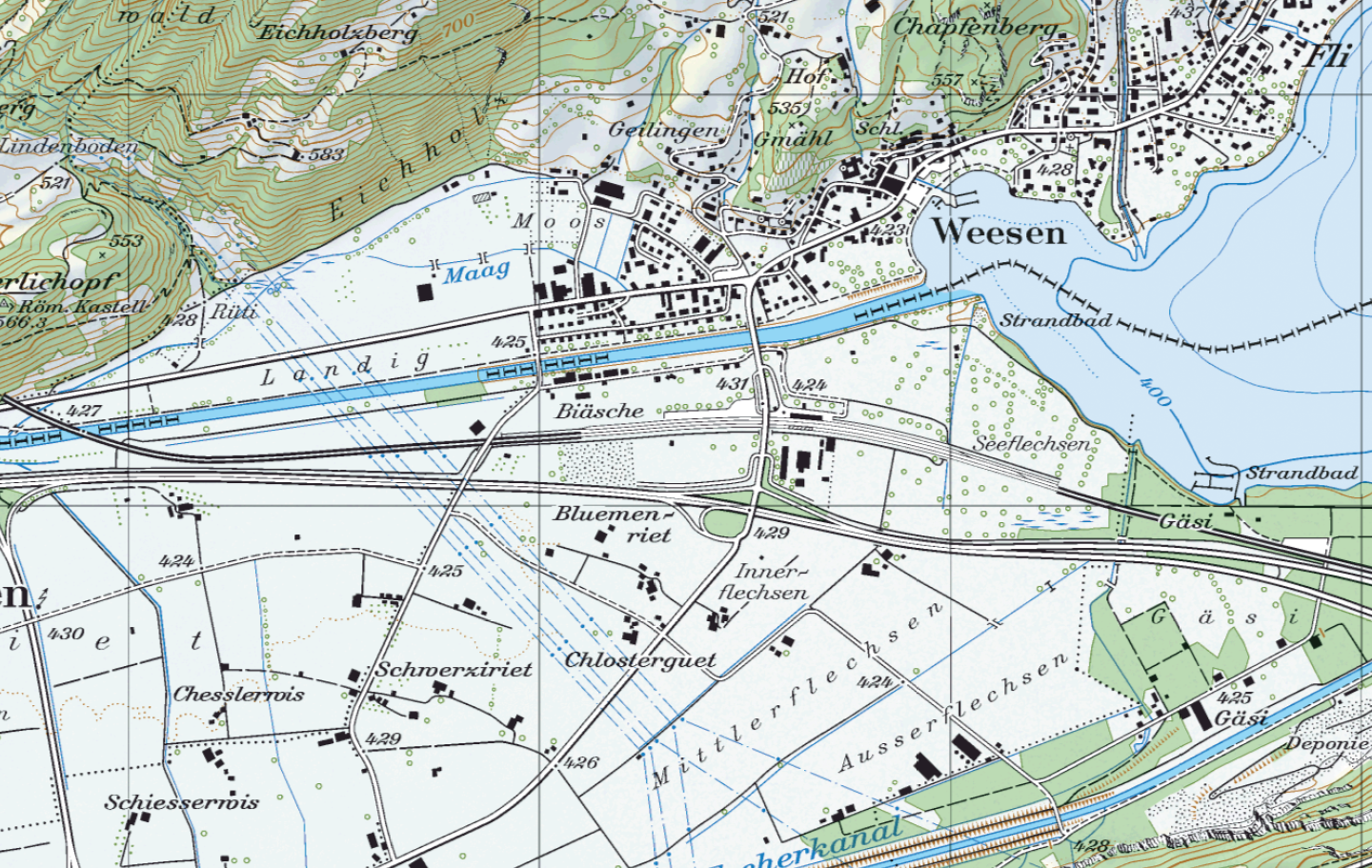
Second Weesen railway station (operational from 1969 to 2013) on the straightended railway line south of Weesen

== See also ==
- Ghost station
