= S17 (St. Gallen S-Bahn) =

Railway service in St. Gallen, Switzerland

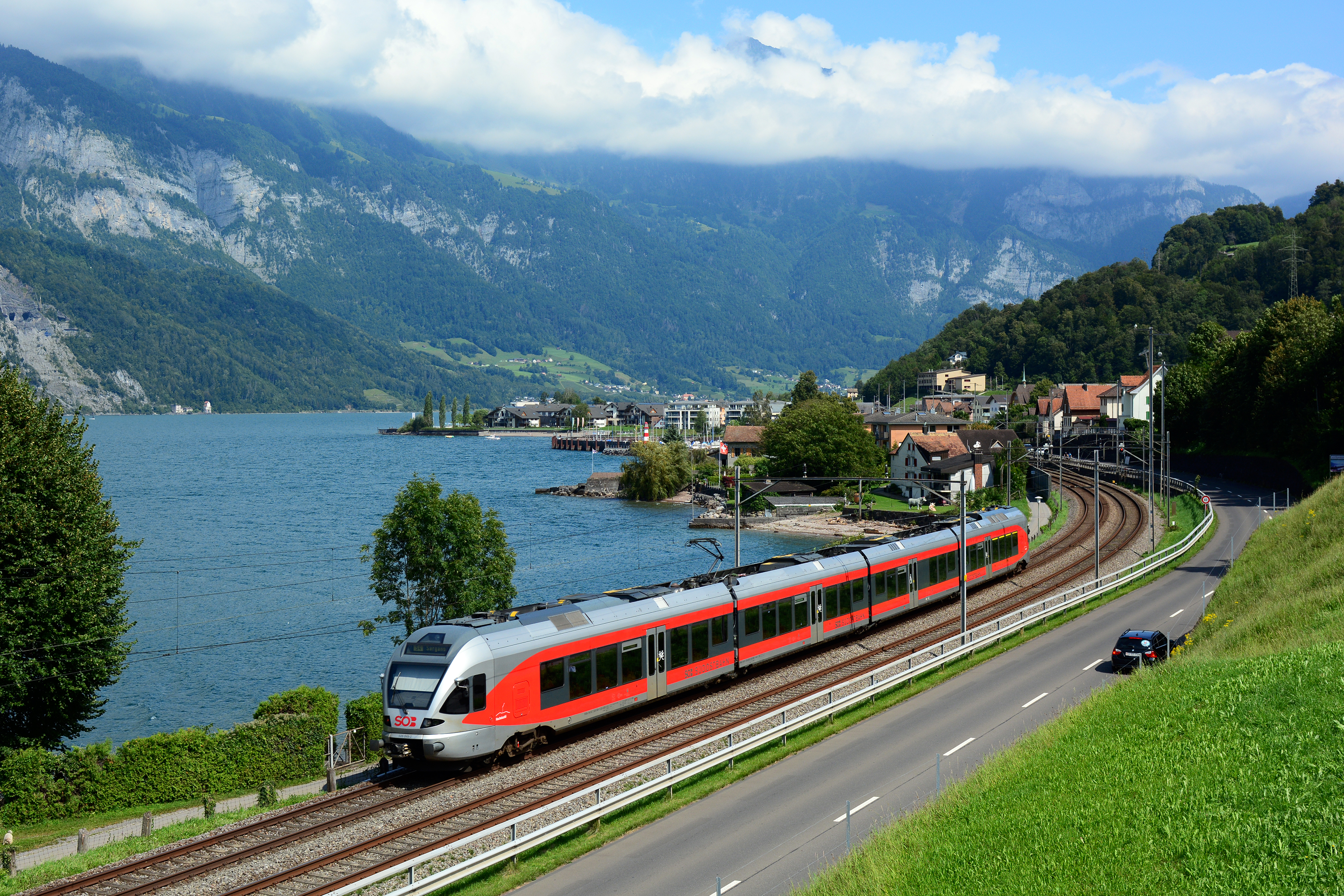
- S17 passes by Walensee

Overview
- First service: 10 December 2023
- Current operator(s): Südostbahn

Route
- Termini: Sargans; Rapperswil
- Stops: 14
- Distance travelled: 59.2 kilometres (36.8 mi)
- Average journey time: 55 minutes
- Service frequency: Hourly
- Line(s) used: Ziegelbrücke–Sargans railway line; Rapperswil–Ziegelbrücke railway line

The S17 is a railway service of the St. Gallen S-Bahn that provides hourly service between Sargans and Rapperswil, connecting stations in the cantons of St. Gallen and Glarus. Südostbahn (SOB), a private company primarily owned by the federal government and the canton of St. Gallen, operates the service.

On its journey, the S17 passes three ghost stations: Bollingen, Weesen and Mols.

== Operations ==
The S17 operates hourly between Sargans and Rapperswil, using the Ziegelbrücke–Sargans and Rapperswil–Ziegelbrücke railway lines. The S6 also operates between Rapperswil and Ziegelbrücke, combining with the S17 for half-hourly service, with calls at every station. Between Uznach and Rapperswil, the S17 and S6 are additionally supported by the S4 and IR Voralpen-Express, both of which do not call at intermediate stations.

The three hours long Alpstein round trip (until December 2023 offered by the former S4 circle line), is still possible by combining the S4 and S17 services. At Sargans, the S17 continues as the S4 in direction of travel (and the S4 continues as S17 in the other direction), so that no change of trains is required; however, passengers do need to change trains either at Uznach or Rapperswil for the complete round trip.

== Route ==
S17 Rapperswil – Uznach – Ziegelbrücke – Sargans

- Sargans
- Mels
- Flums
- Walenstadt
- Unterterzen
- Murg
- Mühlehorn
- Ziegelbrücke
- Schänis
- Benken
- Uznach
- Schmerikon
- Blumenau
- Rapperswil

=== Connections to boat lines and cable car ===
- Rapperswil and Schmerikon are close to landing stages on Lake Zurich (Obersee) served by the ZSG shipping company
- Mühlehorn, Murg and Unterterzen are close to landing stages on Lake Walen served by the Schiffsbetrieb Walensee
- Unterterzen is also close to the valley station of the cable car to Flumserberg resort area

== History ==
Prior to the 10 December 2023 timetable change, service over the Ziegelbrücke–Sargans railway line was provided by the S4, which operated in a bidirectional circular fashion. The expansion to dual track between Uznach and Schmerikon (constructed between 2021 and 2023) on the Rapperswil–Ziegelbrücke railway line permitted expanded service between Rapperswil and Uznach. The S4 was rerouted to run between Sargans and Rapperswil via St. Gallen, while Sargans to Rapperswil via Ziegelbrücke became the new S17.
