= Unterterzen railway station =

Railway station in Switzerland

Unterterzen
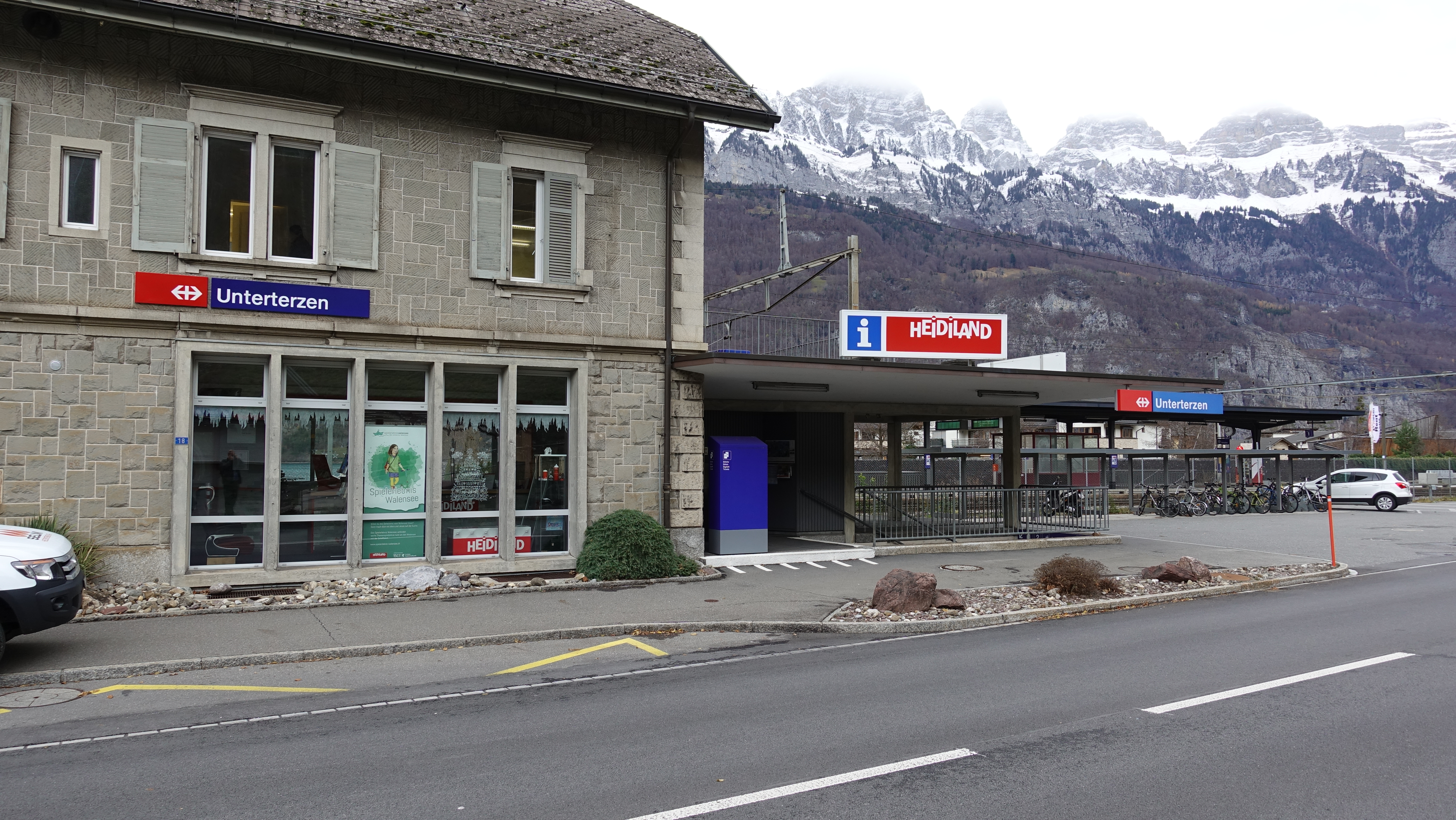
- The station building in 2018

General information
- Location: Quarten; Switzerland
- Coordinates: 47°06′50″N 9°15′18″E
- Elevation: 426 m (1,398 ft)
- Owner: Swiss Federal Railways
- Line: Ziegelbrücke–Sargans line
- Distance: 18.1 km (11.2 mi) from Sargans
- Platforms: 1 island platform
- Tracks: 2
- Train operators: Südostbahn; Swiss Federal Railways
- Connections: Luftseilbahn Unterterzen–Flumserberg; Schiffsbetrieb Walensee

Other information
- Fare zone: 389 (Tarifverbund Ostwind)

Passengers
- 2018: 490 per weekday

Services
Preceding station	St. Gallen S-Bahn	Following station
Murg towards Rapperswil	S17	Walenstadt towards Sargans
Preceding station	Südostbahn	Following station
Ziegelbrücke towards Bern	IR 35 Aare Linth	Walenstadt towards Chur
Location
- Location within Switzerland Location within Canton of St. Gallen

Unterterzen railway station (German: Bahnhof Unterterzen) is a railway station in Quarten, in the Swiss canton of St. Gallen. It is an intermediate stop on the Ziegelbrücke–Sargans line.

== Layout and connections ==
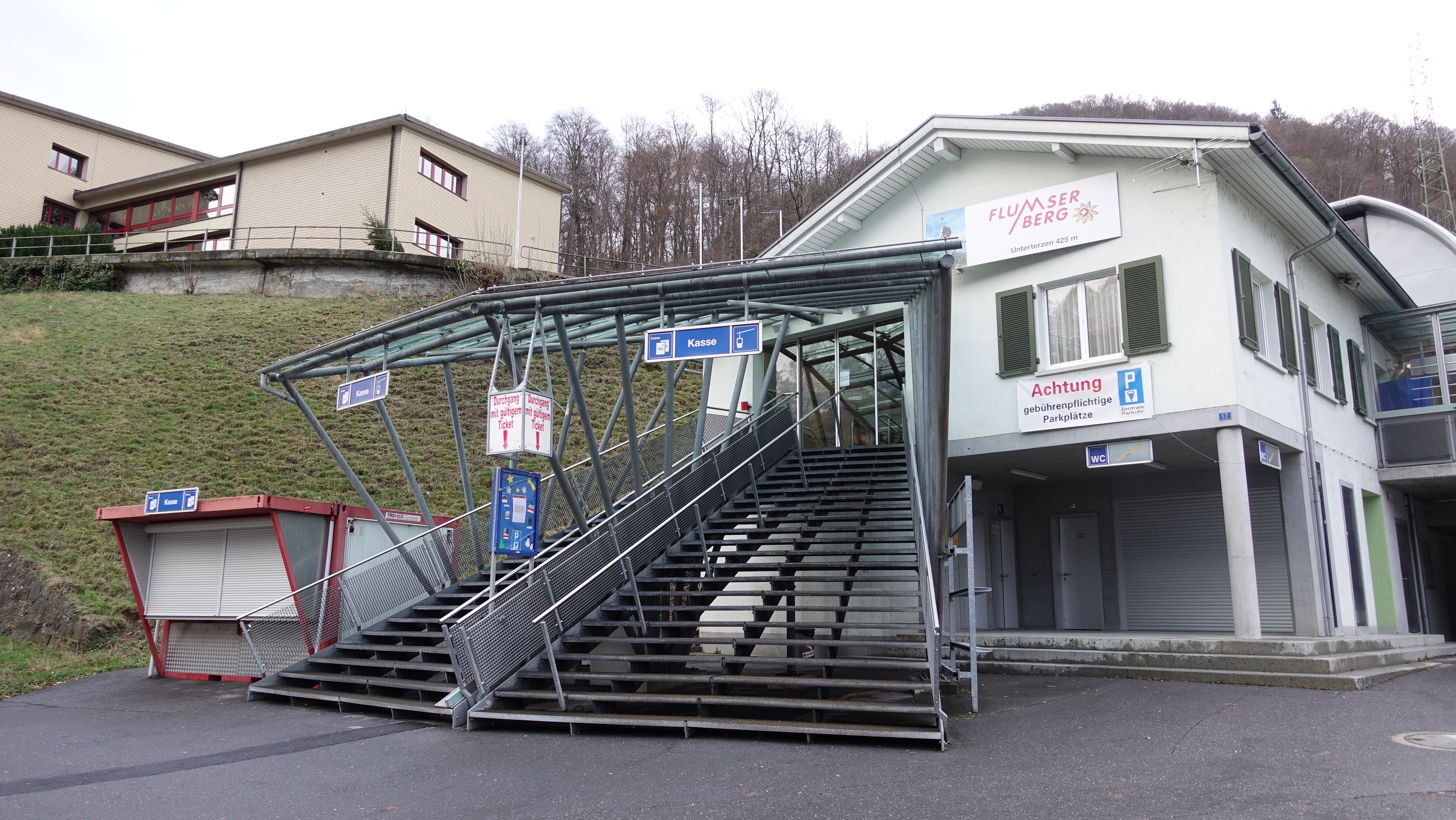
Valley station of Luftseilbahn Unterterzen–Flumserberg

Unterterzen has a single 316-metre (1,037 ft)-long island platform with two tracks. The valley station of the Luftseilbahn Unterterzen–Flumserberg aerial tramway, which carries passengers to the Flumserberg, is located across Walenseestrasse from the station. Schiffsbetrieb Walensee operates ferries on the Walensee from a ferry dock one block north of the station.

== Services ==
As of the December 2024 timetable change, the following services stop at Unterterzen:

- Hourly service between Bern and Chur.
- St. Gallen S-Bahn S17: hourly service between Rapperswil and Sargans via Ziegelbrücke.

== See also ==
- Rail transport in Switzerland
