= Quarten =

- Municipality
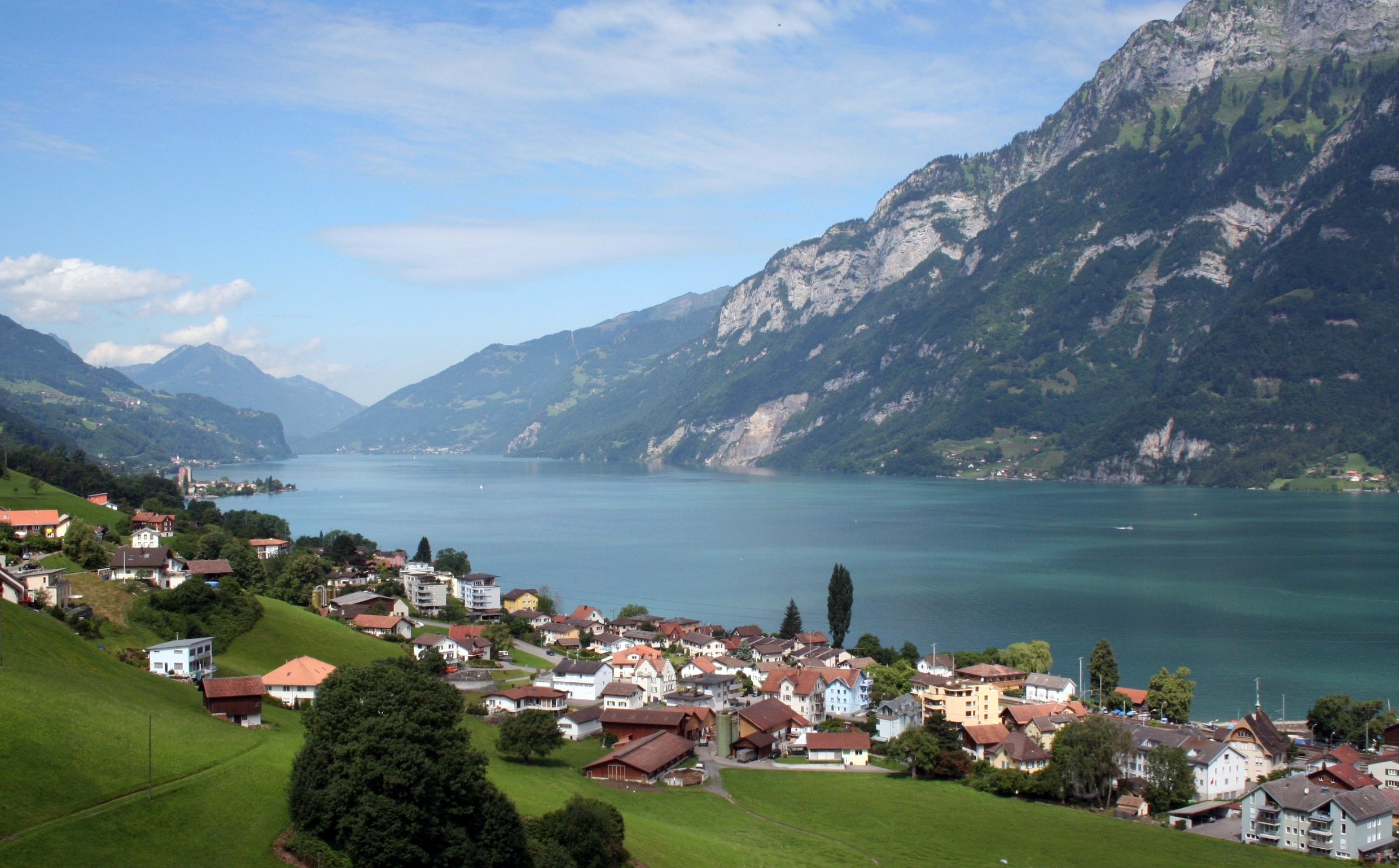
- Unterterzen, Quarten

- Flag Coat of arms
- Location of Quarten
- Location within Switzerland Location within Canton of St. Gallen
- Coordinates: 47°6′N 9°14′E
- Country: Switzerland
- Canton: St. Gallen
- District: Sarganserland

Government
  - Mayor: Erich Zoller Die Mitte

Area
  - Total: 61.90 km^{2} (23.90 sq mi)
- Elevation: 548 m (1,798 ft)

Population (December 2020)
  - Total: 2,988
  - Density: 48.27/km^{2} (125.0/sq mi)
- Time zone: UTC+01:00 (CET)
  - Summer (DST): UTC+02:00 (CEST)
- Postal code: 8883
- SFOS number: 3295
- ISO 3166 code: CH-SG
- Localities: Quarten, Oberterzen, Unterterzen, Quinten, Mols SG, Murg SG, Tannenbodenalp, Flums-Grossberg
- Surrounded by: Alt Sankt Johann, Amden, Engi (GL), Flums, Mühlehorn (GL), Obstalden (GL), Sool (GL), Walenstadt
- Website: www.quarten.ch

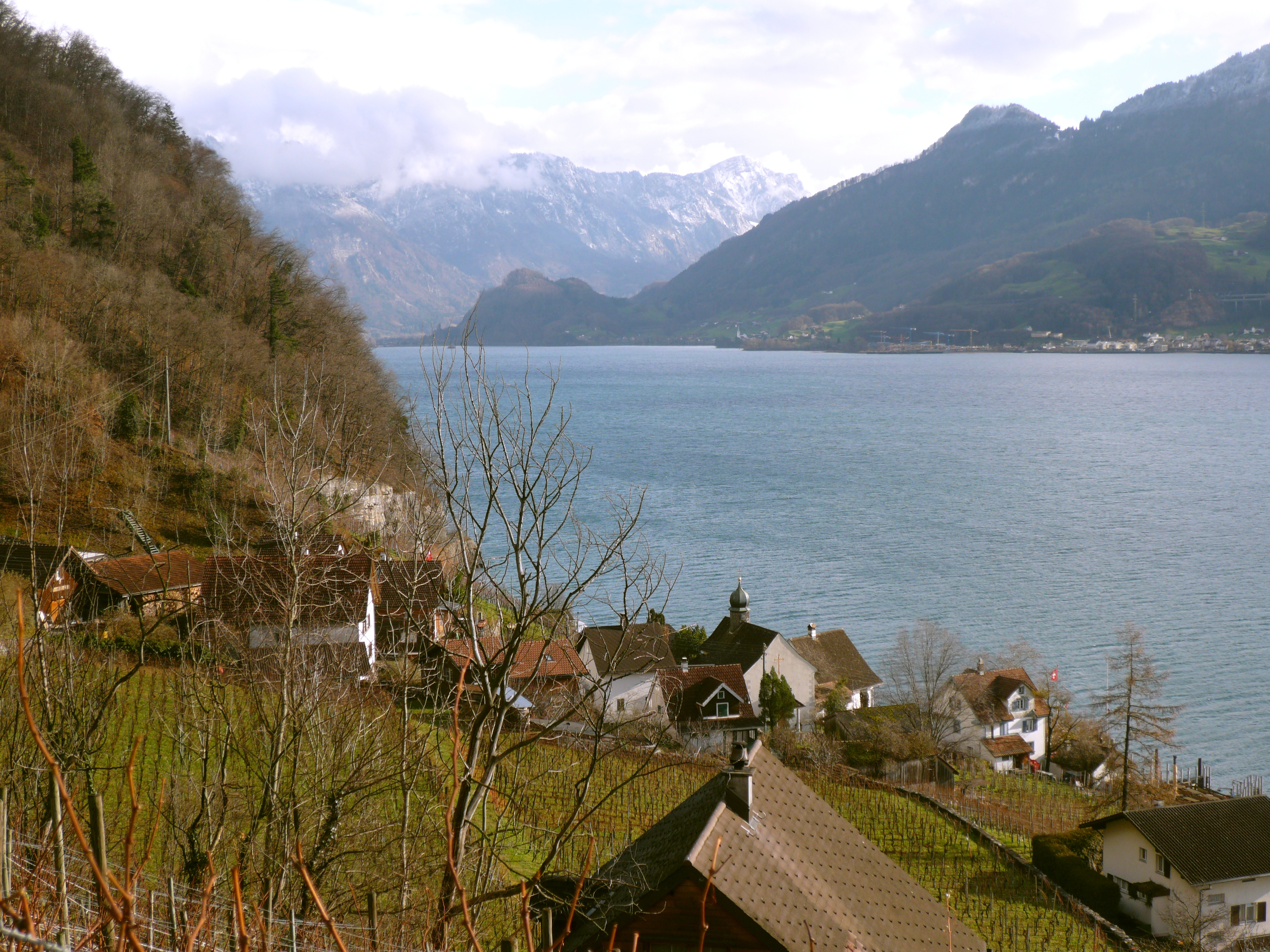
Quinten and Lake Walen

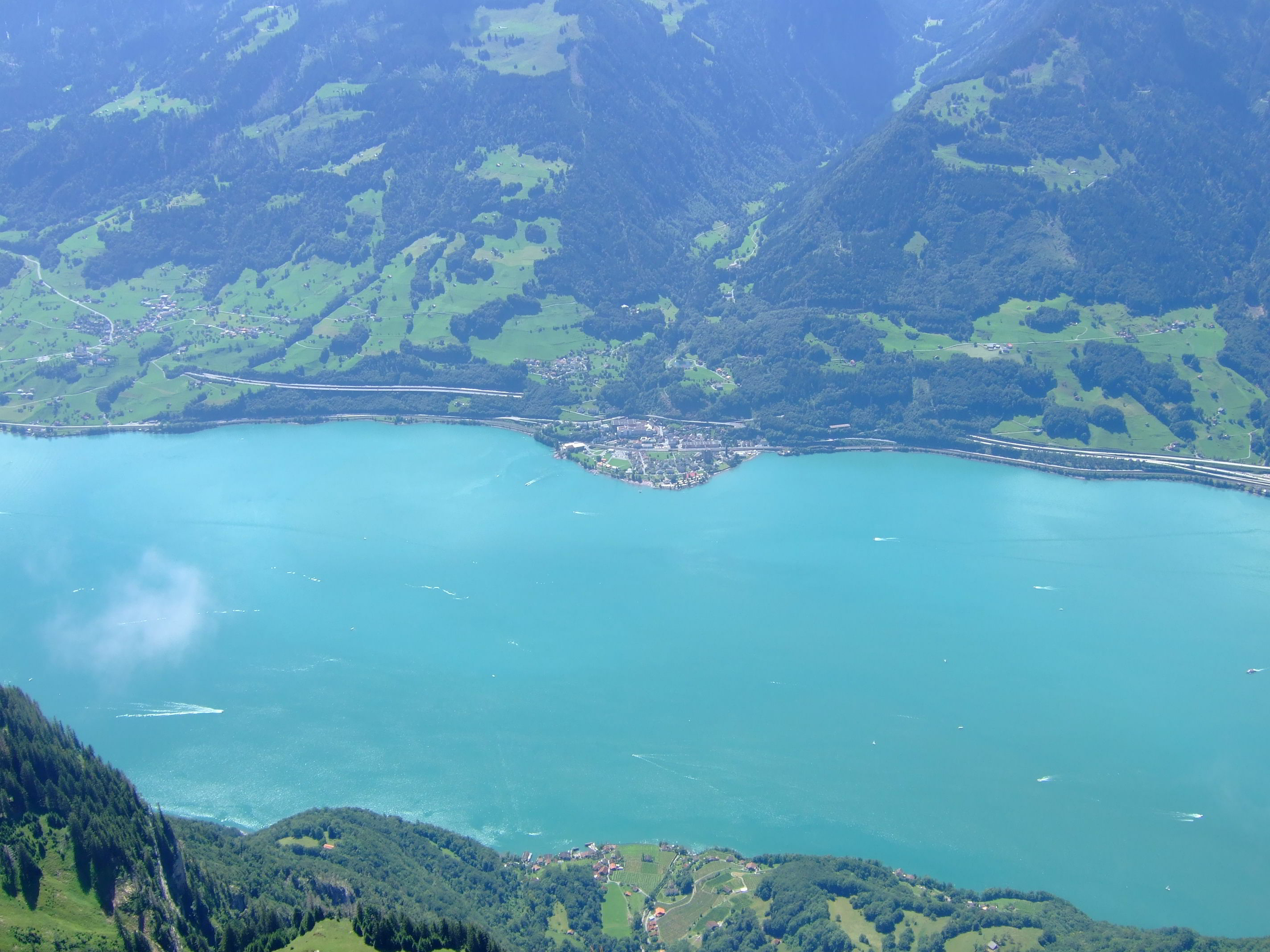
Murg and Quinten villages on opposite sides of the lake

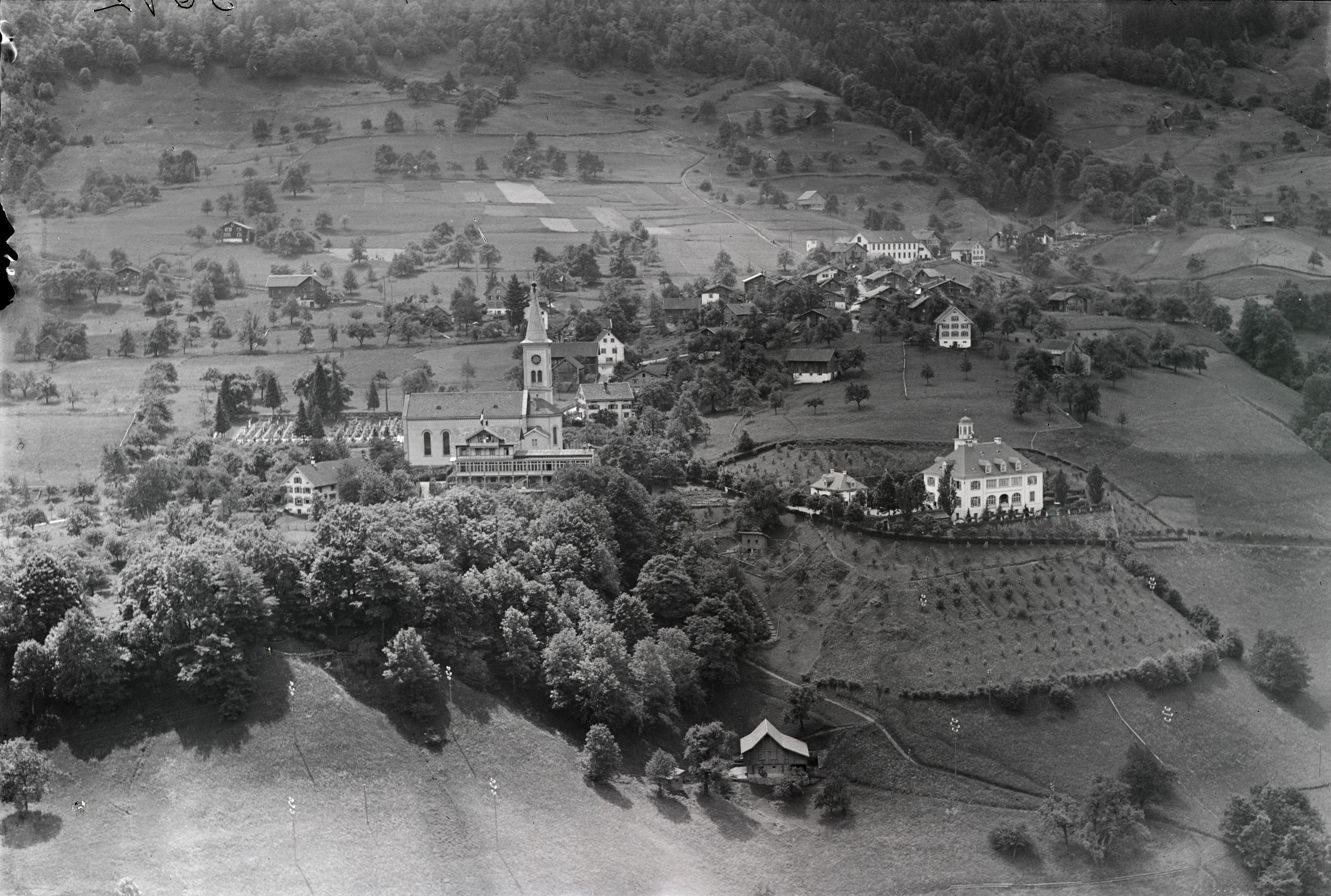
Aerial view from 200 m (660 ft) by Walter Mittelholzer (1923)

Quarten is a municipality in the Wahlkreis (constituency) of Sarganserland, in the canton of St. Gallen, Switzerland, on Lake Walen. Besides the village of Quarten, the municipality also includes the settlements of Oberterzen, Unterterzen, Quinten, Mols, Murg, and parts of Tannenbodenalp.

== History and name ==
Between 801 and 850 AD, the village is mentioned as Quarto, which means "fourth". Like Brüntsch (Primsch in Romansh or first in English; 47.09476°N 9.31922°E), Guns (Seguns in Romansh or second in English; 47.11086°N 9.29187°E), Terzen (third) and Quinten (fifth), Quarten got its name because it was the fourth courtyard of the diocese of Chur. In 1220, the village was known as Quartin.

== Geography ==
The municipality of Quarten stretches for some 8 kilometres (5.0 mi) along the southern shore of the Walensee, and some 10 kilometres (6.2 mi) from the shore inland to the Murg lakes (Murgseen) and the foot of the Gufelstock mountain. On the opposite shore of the lake, a detached section of the municipality takes in 4 kilometres (2.5 mi) of the lake shore, and stretches some 2 kilometres (1.2 mi) up the slopes of the Leistchamm mountain. It also includes the Schnittlauchinsel, a small, uninhabited island in the Walensee.

The settlements of Murg, Unterterzen and Mols lie along the southern shoreline of the Walensee, overlooked by Quarten and Oberterzen at a slightly higher altitude. The hamlet of Quinten lies on the north shore of the Walensee, and is only accessible by boat or on foot. Tannenbodenalp lies some 1,100 metres (3,600 ft) above Unterterzen, forming part of the Flumserberg ski resort, and is split between the municipalities of Quarten and Flums.

Quarten is located in the Sarganserland district. It has an area, as of 2006, of 61.7 km^{2} (23.8 sq mi). Of this area, 33.5% is used for agricultural purposes, while 45.7% is forested. Of the rest of the land, 3.5% is settled (buildings or roads) and the remainder (17.2%) is non-productive (rivers or lakes).

== Coat of arms ==
The blazon of the municipal coat of arms is Per pale Gules a Crosier Argent and Argent a Roman Numeral IV Gules, as it was the fourth courtyard of the diocese of Chur

== Demographics ==
Quarten has a population (as of 31 December 2020) of 2,988. As of 2007, about 17.3% of the population was made up of foreign nationals. Of the foreign population, (as of 2000), 27 are from Germany, 29 are from Italy, 311 are from ex-Yugoslavia, 9 are from Austria, 56 are from Turkey, and 89 are from another country. Over the last 10 years the population has decreased at a rate of -4.5%. Most of the population (as of 2000) speaks German (87.7%), with Serbo-Croatian being second most common (3.6%) and Albanian being third (3.1%). Of the Swiss national languages (as of 2000), 2,411 speak German, 12 people speak French, 18 people speak Italian, and 11 people speak Romansh.

The age distribution, as of 2000, in Quarten is; 345 children or 12.6% of the population are between 0 and 9 years old and 400 teenagers or 14.6% are between 10 and 19. Of the adult population, 360 people or 13.1% of the population are between 20 and 29 years old. 405 people or 14.7% are between 30 and 39, 384 people or 14.0% are between 40 and 49, and 342 people or 12.4% are between 50 and 59. The senior population distribution is 227 people or 8.3% of the population are between 60 and 69 years old, 184 people or 6.7% are between 70 and 79, there are 96 people or 3.5% who are between 80 and 89, and there are 6 people or 0.2% who are between 90 and 99.

In 2000 there were 301 persons (or 10.9% of the population) who were living alone in a private dwelling. There were 499 (or 18.2%) persons who were part of a couple (married or otherwise committed) without children, and 1,567 (or 57.0%) who were part of a couple with children. There were 150 (or 5.5%) people who lived in single parent home, while there are 21 persons who were adult children living with one or both parents, 10 persons who lived in a household made up of relatives, 33 who lived household made up of unrelated persons, and 168 who are either institutionalized or live in another type of collective housing.

In the 2007, 2011 and 2015 federal election the most popular party was the SVP which received 42.2% (2007; 39.4% in 2011 and 47.1% in 2015) of the vote. The next two most popular parties were the CVP (29.4% in 2007; 23.2% in 2011; 17.8% in 2015), and the FDP (10.1% in 2007; 10.0% in 2011; 11.4% in 2015).

In Quarten about 61.9% of the population (between age 25–64) have completed either non-mandatory upper secondary education or additional higher education (either university or a Fachhochschule). Out of the total population in Quarten, as of 2000, the highest education level completed by 704 people (25.6% of the population) was Primary, while 953 (34.7%) have completed their secondary education, 171 (6.2%) have attended a Tertiary school, and 145 (5.3%) are not in school. The remainder did not answer this question.

The historical population is given in the following table:

year	population
1831	1,627
1850	1,995
1900	2,205
1950	2,727
2000	2,749

== Transport ==
The municipality is located on the A3 motorway.

Unterterzen railway station is located on the Ziegelbrücke–Sargans railway. As of 2025, the S17 of the St. Gallen S-Bahn and the IR35 (Bern – Zürich HB – Chur) call at the station. There is also a connecting bus to Walenstadt. There is another station in Murg, served by the S17. The station in In Mols closed in December 2021.

There is a cablecar from Unterterzen railway station to Tannenbodenalp (Flumserberg), via Oberterzen.

Landing stages in Murg, Unterterzen, Mols and Quinten are served by boat cruises of Schiffsbetrieb Walensee. A ferry service is running between Murg and Quinten.

== Economy ==
As of 2007, Quarten had an unemployment rate of 1.21%. As of 2005, there were 152 people employed in the primary economic sector and about 60 businesses involved in this sector. 225 people are employed in the secondary sector and there are 39 businesses in this sector. 477 people are employed in the tertiary sector, with 84 businesses in this sector.

As of October 2009 the average unemployment rate was 2.8%. There were 192 businesses in the municipality of which 39 were involved in the secondary sector of the economy while 97 were involved in the third.

As of 2000 there were 640 residents who worked in the municipality, while 737 residents worked outside Quarten and 210 people commuted into the municipality for work.

== Religion ==
From the 2000 census, 1,834 or 66.7% are Roman Catholic, while 360 or 13.1% belonged to the Swiss Reformed Church. Of the rest of the population, there are 2 individuals (or about 0.07% of the population) who belong to the Christian Catholic faith, there are 90 individuals (or about 3.27% of the population) who belong to the Orthodox Church, and there are 5 individuals (or about 0.18% of the population) who belong to another Christian church. There are 238 (or about 8.66% of the population) who are Islamic. There are 1 individuals (or about 0.04% of the population) who belong to another church (not listed on the census), 122 (or about 4.44% of the population) belong to no church, are agnostic or atheist, and 97 individuals (or about 3.53% of the population) did not answer the question.

== Gallery ==
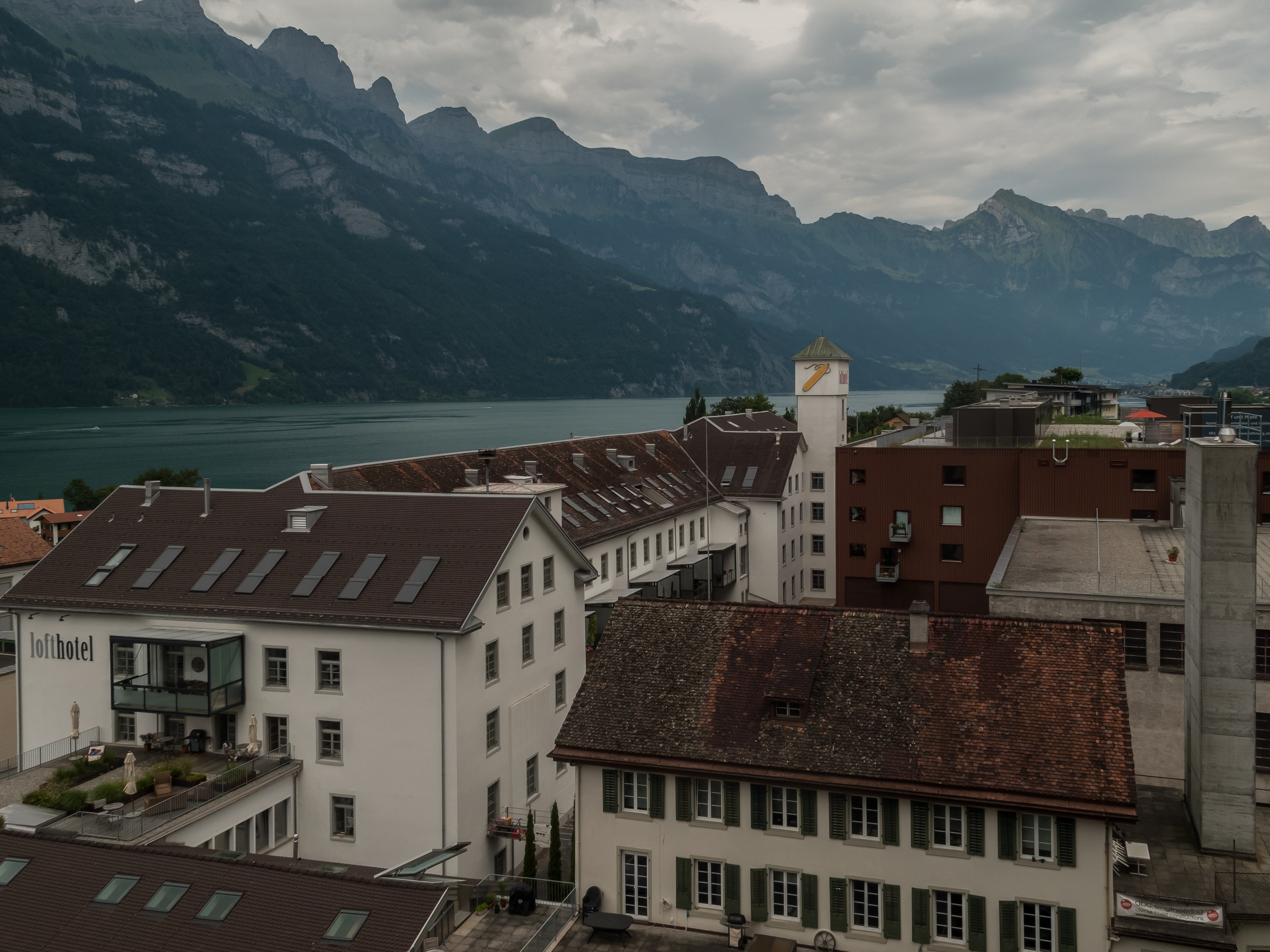
View over Murg and Walensee

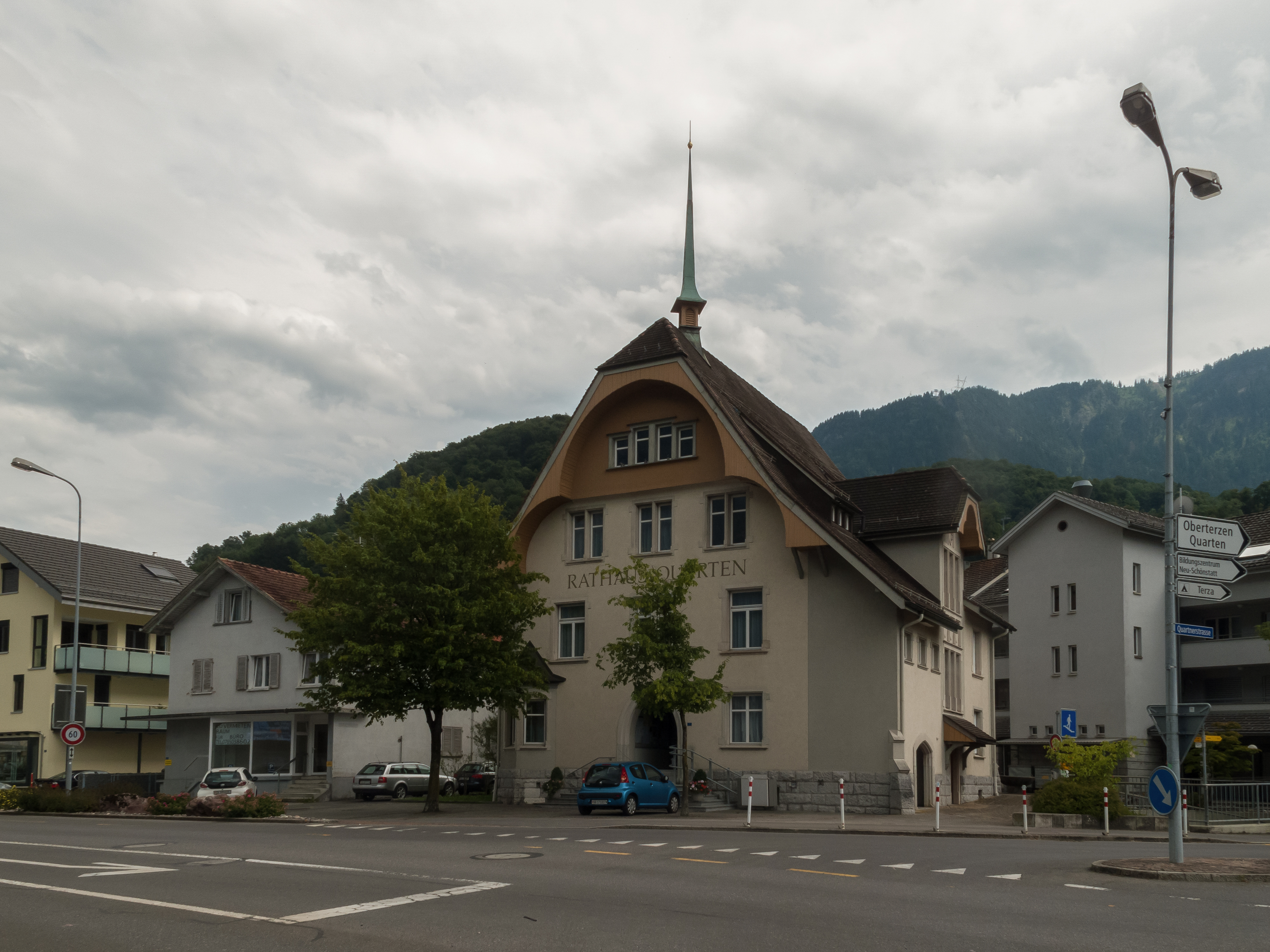
Unterterzen townhall

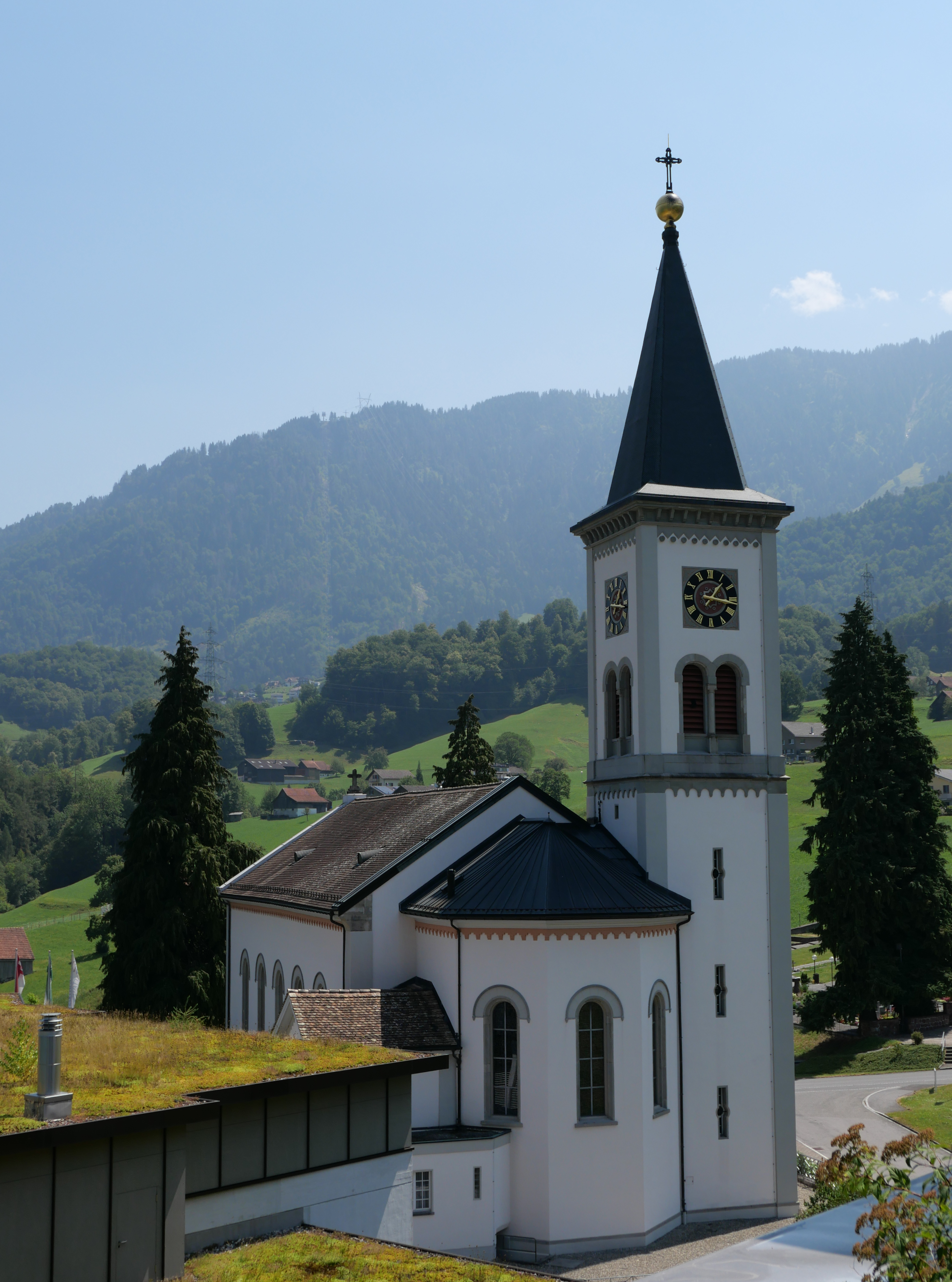
St. Gallus church in Quarten village

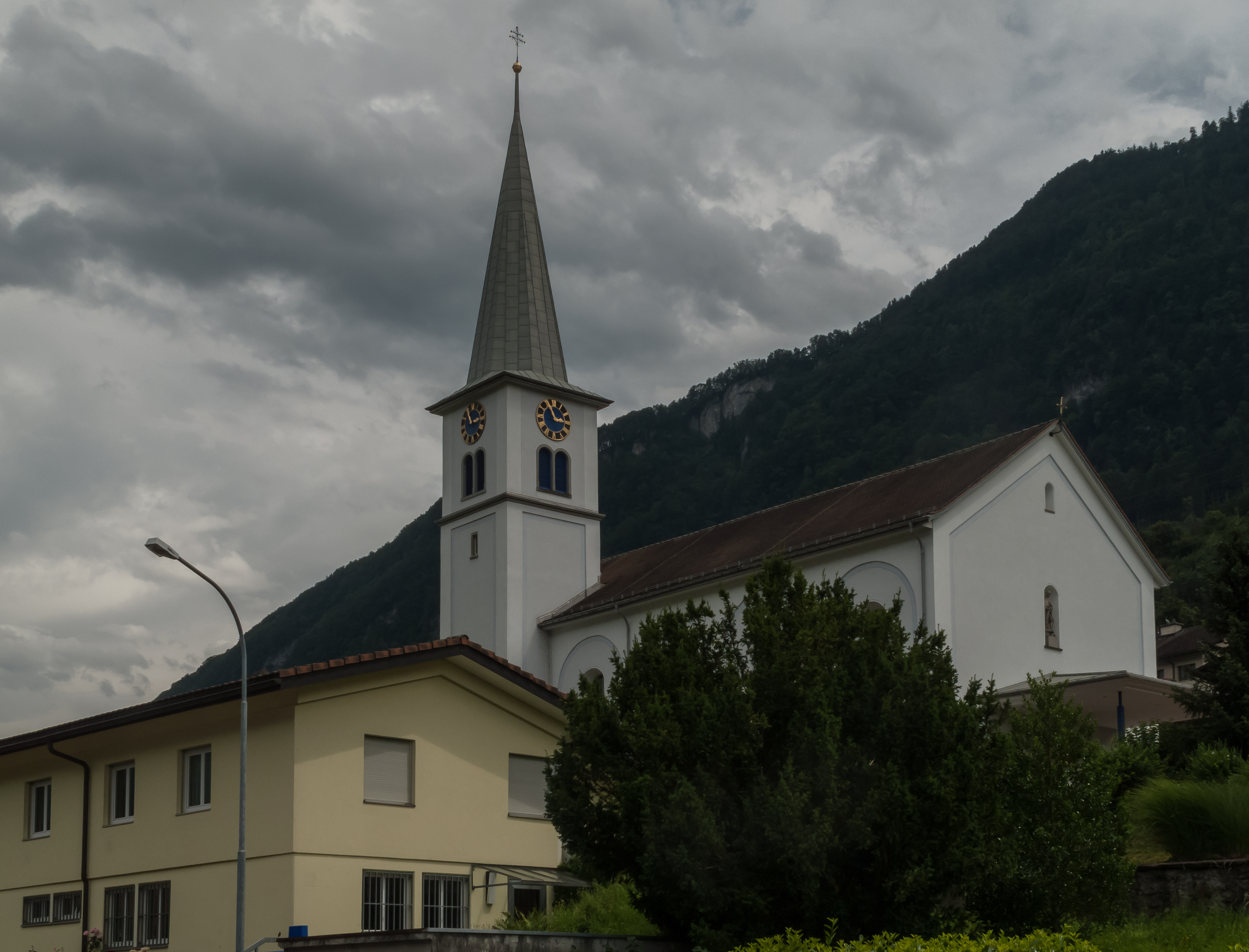
Sankt Antonius von Padua church in Mols

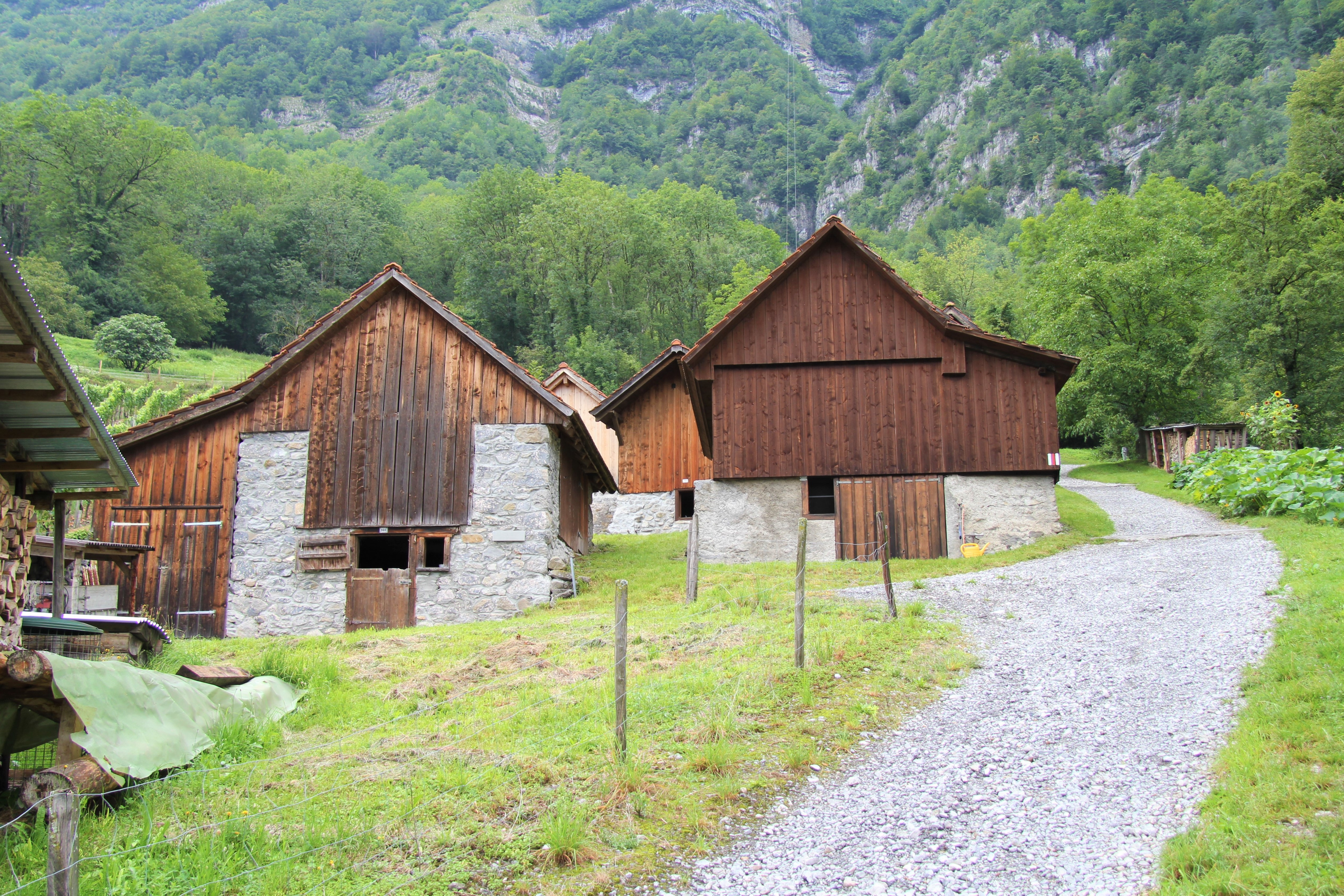
Car-free hamlet of Quinten
