= Flumserberg =

Resort area in the Swiss Alps

Coordinates: 47°05′24″N 9°17′48″E

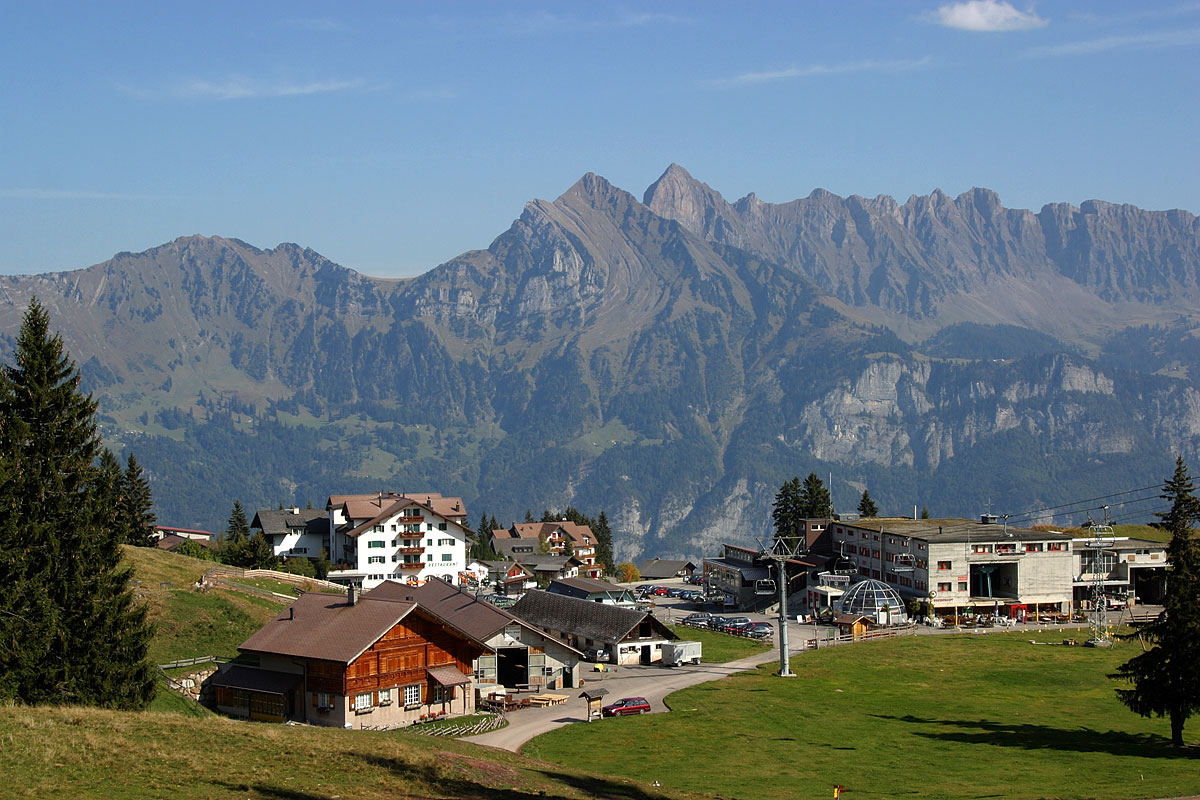
View of Tannenbodenalp

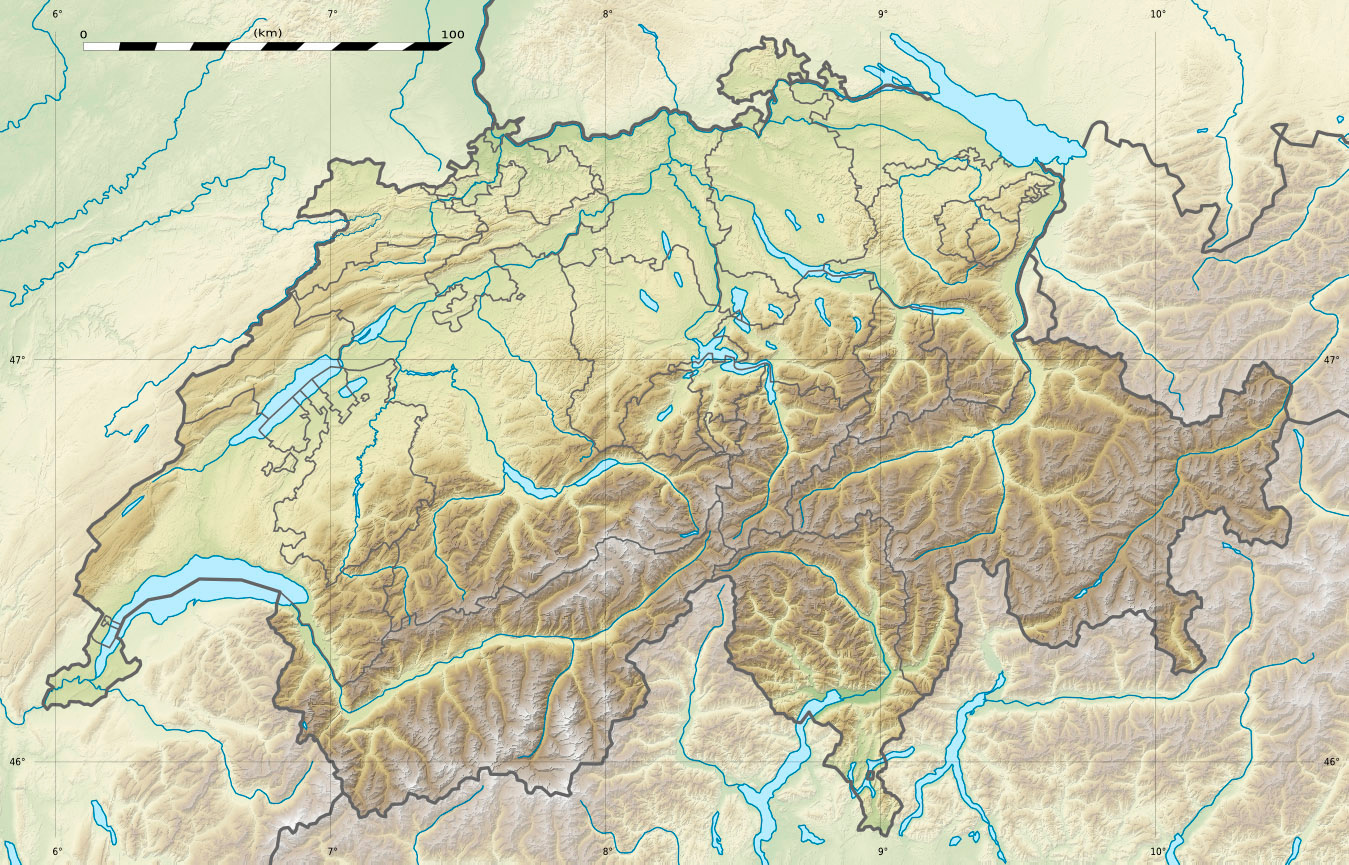
Location in Switzerland

Flumserberg is a resort area in the Swiss Alps, located in the canton of St. Gallen. It is composed of several villages at elevations between 1,160 and 1,344 metres (3,806 and 4,409 ft) above sea level.

== Description ==
The resort sits on a terrace overlooking the Walensee and the Churfirsten range, above Flums in the Sarganserland region. Flumserberg mainly belongs to the municipality of Flums, with a small part belonging to the municipality of Quarten. The three main villages composing the resort of Flumserberg are: Tannenbodenalp (1,344 m / 4,409 ft), Flumserberg (1,275 m / 4,183 ft) and Tannenheim (1,160 m / 3,810 ft).

The resort features skiing areas during winter and several hiking and biking trails and a summer toboggan (Floomzer) during summer.

== Transportation ==
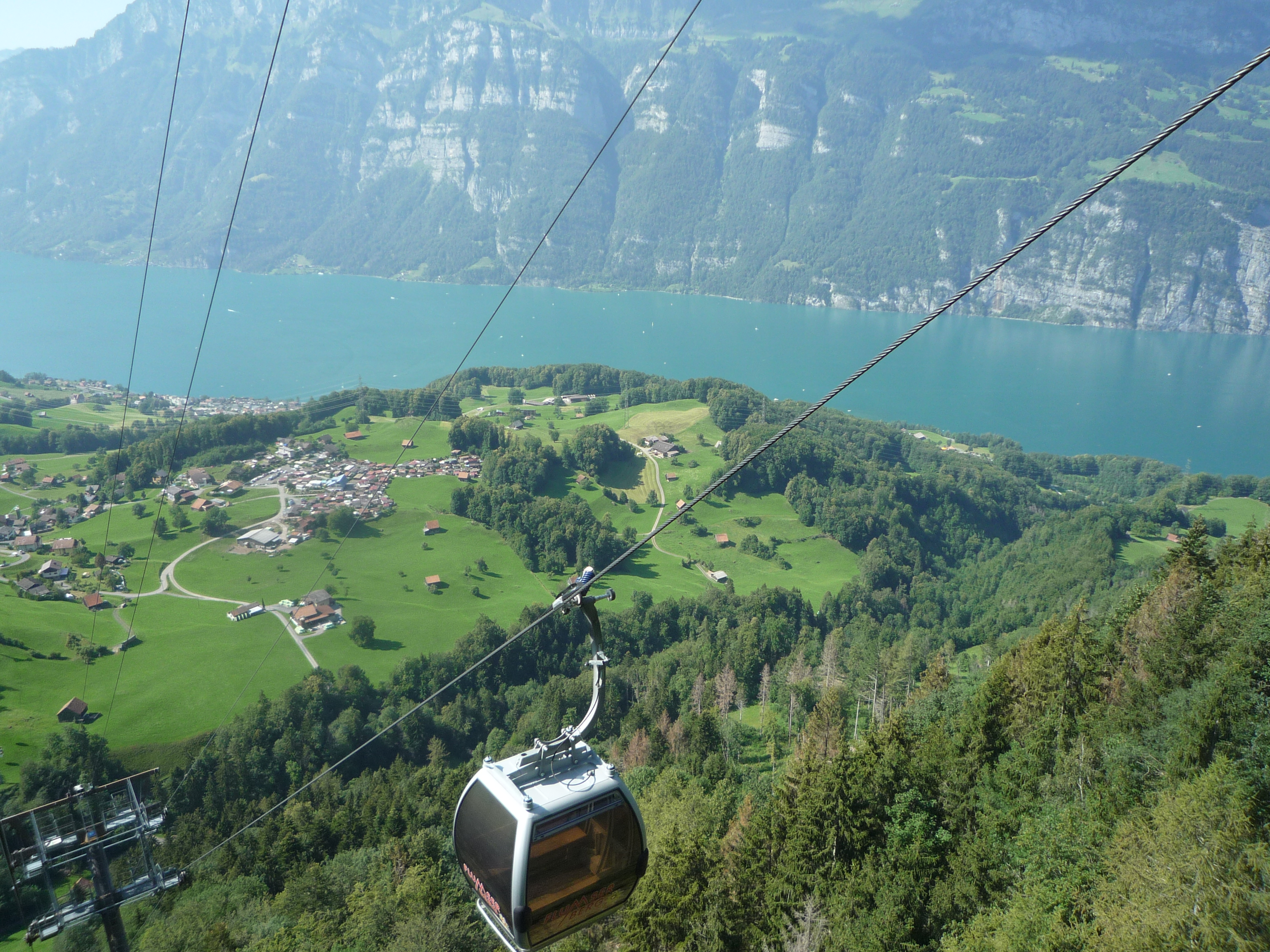
Luftseilbahn Unterterzen–Flumserberg gondola lift with view over Lake Walen

The Luftseilbahn Unterterzen–Flumserberg (SeeJet) gondola lift connects Tannenboden with Unterterzen via Oberterzen (intermediate station). The valley station of the cable car is located adjacent to Unterterzen railway station. An InterRegio and a regional train (S17 of St. Gallen S-Bahn) call at the station.

== See also ==
- Glarus Alps
- List of ski areas and resorts in Switzerland
