= Ziegelbrücke–Sargans railway line =

Railway line in Switzerland

Ziegelbrücke–Sargans
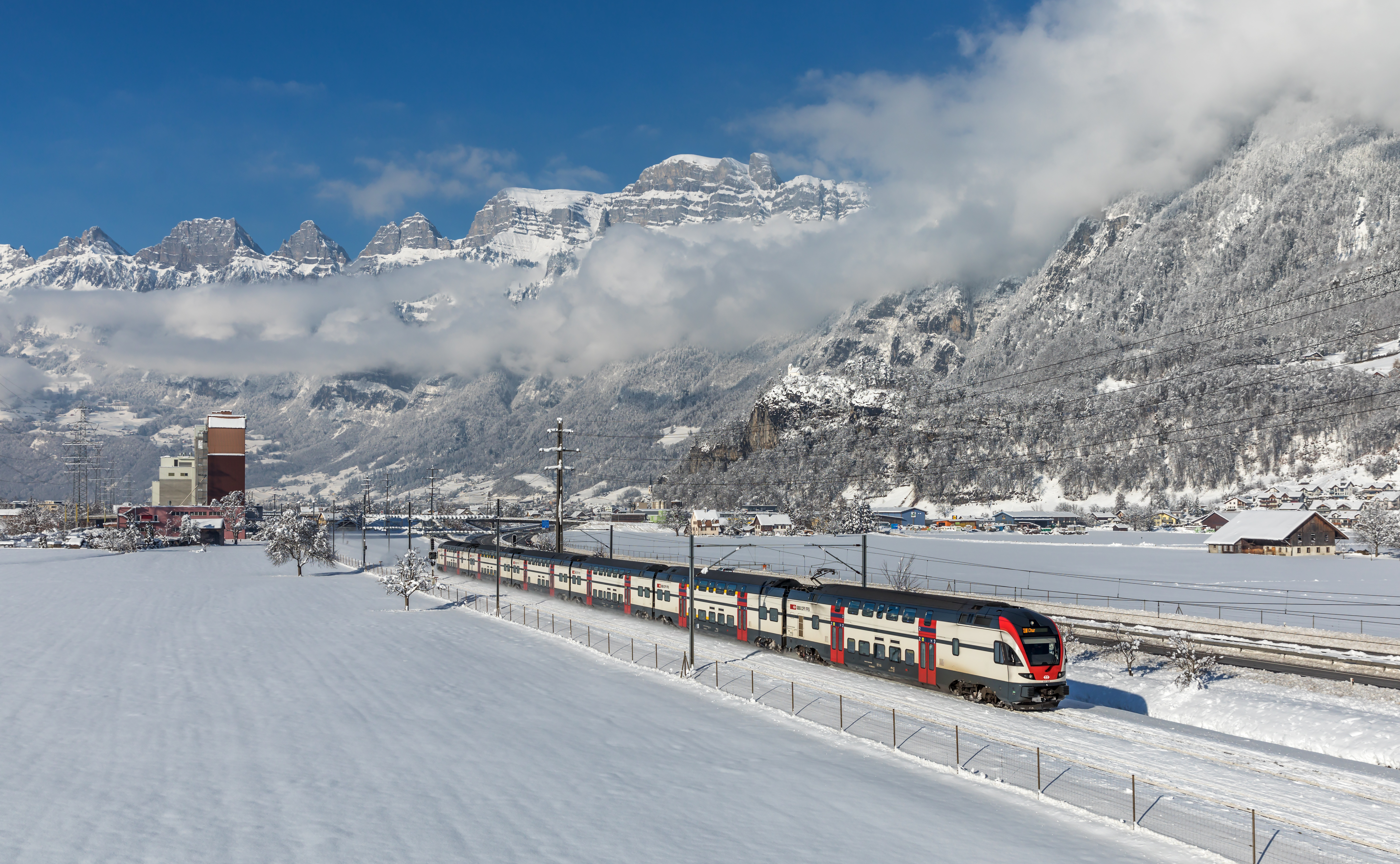
- Former RegioExpress near Flums in 2021

Overview
- Line number: 900
- Locale: Switzerland
- Termini: Ziegelbrücke; Sargans

Technical
- Line length: 33.6 km (20.9 mi)
- Track gauge: 1,435 mm (4 ft 8 1/2 in)
- Electrification: 15 kV/16.7 Hz AC overhead catenary

The Ziegelbrücke–Sargans railway line is a railway line in the Swiss cantons of St. Gallen and Glarus owned by Swiss Federal Railways (SBB) and operated by services of SBB, SOB, ÖBB and DB. It connects Ziegelbrücke with Sargans via Lake Walen and the Seez Valley.

== Route ==
It runs from Ziegelbrücke railway station as an eastward extension of the Lake Zurich left-bank railway to Sargans railway station. At Ziegelbrücke, it connects with the Rapperswil–Ziegelbrücke railway and the Ziegelbrücke–Linthal railway. It is an important rail link in the south and east of the canton of St. Gallen and follows the left bank of the Lake Walen (Walensee) and the Seeztal. It is double-tracked, except for a short, one-tracked section between Mühlehorn and Murg. It connects with the Rhine valley line in Sargans. Since the 1980s, there has been a loop in Sargans which allows EuroCity, Railjet services and freight trains operating directly between Zurich and Austria and S-Bahn services towards St. Gallen to avoid reversing in the station.

The stations of Mühlehorn, Murg and Unterterzen are in proximity to landing stages served by Lake Walen navigation company.

== History ==
The Ziegelbrücke–Sargans railway and its continuation to Chur was built as part of sections of different lines of the United Swiss Railways (Vereinigte Schweizerbahnen, VSB), which were opened independently of each other. First, the line between Chur and Sargans was opened as part of the Chur–Rheineck line on 1 July 1858. Operations commenced on the Sargans–Murg line and between Ziegelbrücke and Weesen as part of the Rüti–Weesen–Glarus line on 15. February 1859. The Murg–Weesen line was opened on 1 July 1859.

Until 1875 all express trains to and from Chur ran via the Uster–Rapperswil line, as the Thalwil–Pfäffikon line of the Swiss Northeastern Railway (Schweizerische Nordostbahn, NOB) had not yet been completed.

As early as 1918, passenger traffic on the Weesen–Näfels section of the former VSB Rüti–Weesen–Glarus line was abandoned, because the connection from Glarus to the former NOB line appeared more useful. The disused section was dismantled in 1931.

In the following years, the track was straightened and duplicated. First, in 1941, the Bommerstein Tunnel was relocated east of Mols. In 1961, the double-track Kerenzerberg Tunnel was opened, replacing the one-track section along the Walensee west of Murg. The old route was used for the construction of the Walenseestrasse (Walensee road), which required the tunnels to be widened. It now operates as the northern carriageway of the A3 autobahn. In 1969, the line between the west portal of the Kerenzerberg Tunnel and Ziegelbrücke was straightened. This involved the relocation of Weesen station from the north side of the Linth canal to the south side and the construction of a new Linth canal bridge and the Biberlikopf Tunnel.

Today only very short section between Mühlehorn and Murg is single track.

Today (2018), an InterCity and an InterRegio service runs every hour between Zurich and Chur. While the InterCity trains predominantly consist of IC2000 push-pull sets propelled by class SBB Re 460 locomotives, there are also locomotive-hauled trains consisting of standard coaches (Einheitswagen) and (partly former) Eurocity coaches hauled by locomotives of classes Re 420 or Re 460. The InterRegios were converted to Stadler KISS (RABe 511) at the end of 2013 and they no longer continue through Zurich to/from Basel, but they also stop in Walenstadt. This also eliminated the InterRegio services that had continued twice a day from Basel to Hamburg-Altona. These two train operated as EuroCity services, but had the same stopping pattern as IR services.

At the end of 2013, the regional trains were also changed. Instead of NPZ push-pull trains, which ran from Ziegelbrücke to Chur, the line was served by S4 service of St. Gallen S-Bahn, operated by Südostbahn (SOB) using Stadler Flirt sets, and stops at all the stations between Ziegelbrücke and Sargans. Weesen station has not been served since this change (instead, the Ziegelbrücke–Amden bus route of the Autobetrieb Weesen-Amden serves it every half hour). With the 2023 timetable change, the S17 took over the Walensee branch of the former S4 circle line. Until December 2024, some S2 services of Zurich S-Bahn continued from Ziegelbrücke to Unterterzen (without stopping at the intermediate stations).

== Operations ==
=== Long-distance traffic ===
- / ICE/ECE 20: Chur – Landquart – Bad Ragaz – Sargans – Ziegelbrücke – Pfäffikon SZ – Wädenswil – Thalwil – Zürich HB – Basel SBB (– Hamburg-Altona)
- Railjet: Wien Hauptbahnhof – Feldkirch – Buchs SG – Sargans – Zürich HB
- Transalpin: Graz – Feldkirch – Buchs SG – Sargans – Zürich HB
- (Aare Linth): Bern – Burgdorf – Herzogenbuchsee – Langenthal – Olten – Zürich Altstetten – Zürich HB – Thalwil – Wädenswil – Pfäffikon SZ – Siebnen-Wangen – Ziegelbrücke – Unterterzen – Walenstadt – Sargans – Bad Ragaz – Maienfeld – Landquart – Chur

=== Regional traffic ===
- St. Gallen S-Bahn S17: Rapperswil – Uznach – Ziegelbrücke – Sargans

=== Freight traffic ===
Freight traffic is heavy between Sargans and Buchs, because this is the transit route to the Vorarlberg and to the rest of Austria. The trains from France (Mulhouse) and the Limmattal marshalling yard (west of Zurich) to the Hall in Tirol marshalling yard use the route through the Buchs border crossing. The crossing at St. Margrethen is only used by trains to and from the Wolfurt marshalling yard. The Buchs marshalling yard serves the whole Swiss Rhine valley.
