= Sargans railway station =

Railway station in Switzerland

Sargans
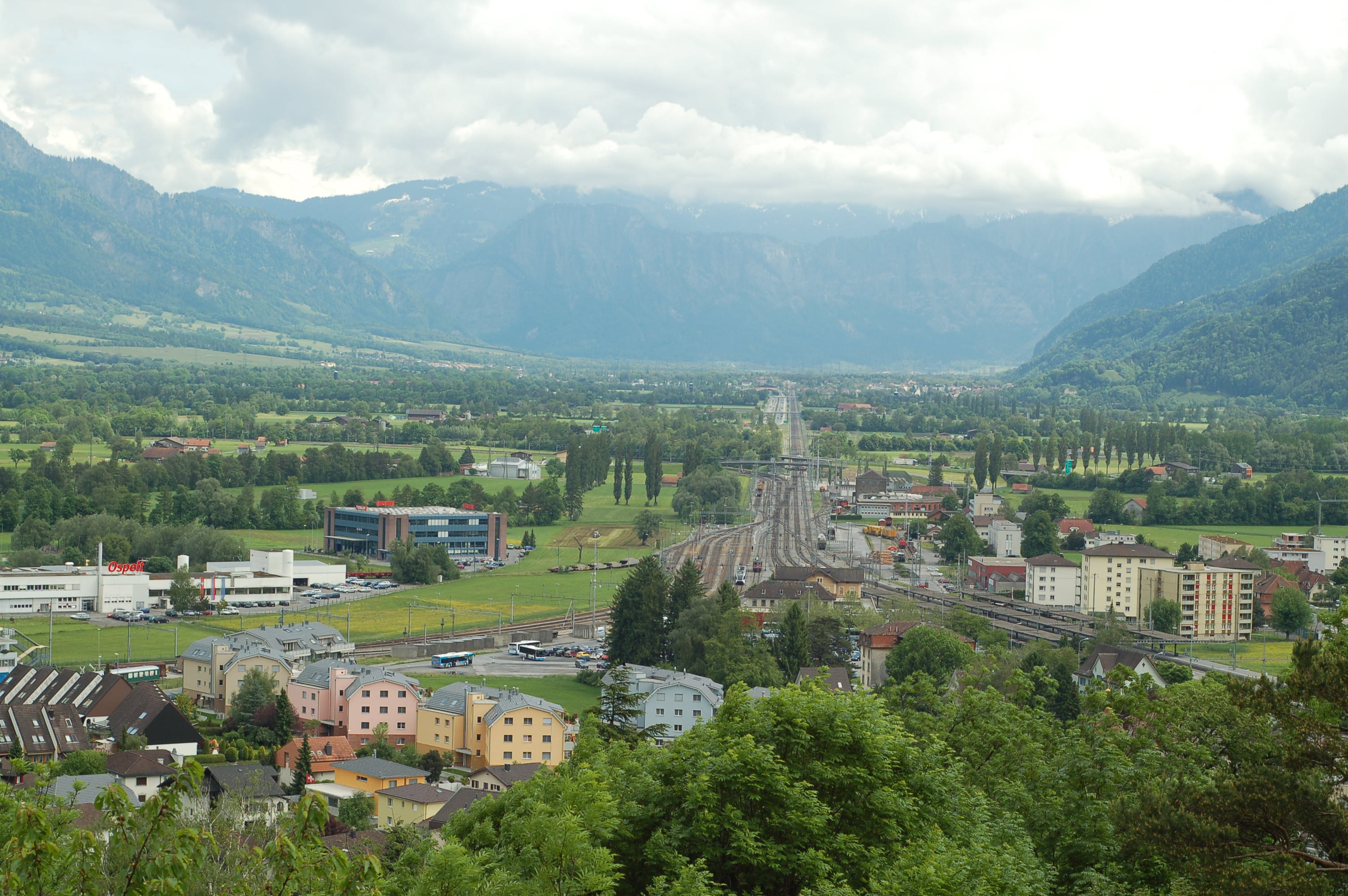
- View of the station area from Sargans Castle

General information
- Location: Sargans; Switzerland
- Coordinates: 47°02′43″N 9°26′43″E
- Owner: Swiss Federal Railways
- Lines: Chur–Rorschach line; Ziegelbrücke–Sargans line
- Distance: 25.7 km (16.0 mi) from Chur; 33.6 km (20.9 mi) from Ziegelbrücke; 65.0 km (40.4 mi) from Rorschach
- Platforms: 1 island platform; 4 side platforms
- Tracks: 6
- Train operators: Südostbahn; THURBO; Swiss Federal Railways; Austrian Federal Railways (ÖBB)
- Connections: Liechtenstein Bus; Bus Sarganserland Werdenberg; PostAuto Schweiz

Passengers
- 2025: 16,000 per day (SBB, SOB, Thurbo)
- Rank: 52 out of 1,095 (Note: Tied with Burgdorf railway station and Geneva Airport railway station.)
Services
Preceding station	SBB CFF FFS	Following station
Zürich HB Terminus	EuroCity (Transalpin)	Buchs SG towards Graz Hbf
Zürich HB towards Basel SBB	IC 3	Landquart towards Chur
Buchs SG towards Zürich HB	IR 13	Terminus
Preceding station	ÖBB	Following station
Zürich HB Terminus	Railjet Express	Buchs SG towards Vienna Airport
Zürich HB Terminus	Railjet Express	Buchs SG towards Bratislava hl.st.
Zürich HB Terminus	Railjet Express	Buchs SG towards Budapest Keleti
Preceding station	DB Fernverkehr	Following station
Zürich HB towards Frankfurt (Main) Hbf	ICE 12	Landquart towards Chur
Preceding station	Südostbahn	Following station
Buchs SG towards St. Gallen	IR 13 Alpenrhein-Express	Bad Ragaz towards Chur
Flums towards Bern	IR 35 Aare Linth	Bad Ragaz towards Chur
Preceding station	St. Gallen S-Bahn	Following station
Sevelen towards Rapperswil	S4	Terminus
Terminus	S12	Bad Ragaz towards Chur
Mels towards Rapperswil	S17	Terminus
Location
- Location within Switzerland Location within Canton of St. Gallen

Sargans railway station (German: Bahnhof Sargans) is a railway station in Sargans, in the Swiss canton of St. Gallen. It is an intermediate stop on the Chur–Rorschach line and eastern terminus of the Ziegelbrücke–Sargans line. It is served by local, regional, and long-distance trains.

== Layout ==
Sargans is a keilbahnhof and located between the Chur–Rorschach and Ziegelbrücke–Sargans railway lines. On the south side, serving the Ziegelbrücke–Sargans railway line, are two side platforms and an island platform with four tracks (Nos. 2–5). On the north side, serving the Chur–Rorschach railway line, are two side platforms with two tracks (Nos. 6–7).

== Services ==
As of the December 2023 timetable change, the following services stop at Sargans:

- Intercity Express:
  - ICE/ECE 20 Two round-trips per day over the Chur–Rorschach and Ziegelbrücke–Sargans lines between Hamburg and Chur.
- Railjet Express: Four round-trips per day over the Chur–Rorschach and Ziegelbrücke–Sargans lines from Zürich Hauptbahnhof to Vienna, Budapest, or Bratislava.
- Nightjet/EuroNight: Overnight trains over the Chur–Rorschach and Ziegelbrücke–Sargans lines from Zürich Hauptbahnhof to Graz, Vienna, Prague, Budapest, or Zagreb.
- EuroCity: Transalpin: Single round-trip per day over the Chur–Rorschach line between Zürich Hauptbahnhof and Graz Hauptbahnhof.
- InterCity:
  - Hourly service over the Chur–Rorschach and Ziegelbrücke–Sargans lines from Basel SBB or Zürich Hauptbahnhof to Chur
- InterRegio:
  - Hourly service between Zürich Hauptbahnhof and Sargans and hourly service between St. Gallen and Chur, combined forming half-hourly service between St. Gallen and Sargans
  - Hourly service over the Chur–Rorschach and Ziegelbrücke–Sargans lines between Bern and Chur.
- St. Gallen S-Bahn
  - S4: hourly service over the Chur–Rorschach line to Rapperswil via St. Gallen.
  - S12: half-hourly service over the Chur–Rorschach line to Chur.
  - S17: hourly service over the Ziegelbrücke–Sargans line to Rapperswil via Uznach.

== See also ==
- Rail transport in Switzerland
