= Schiffsbetrieb Walensee =

Ferry company in Switzerland

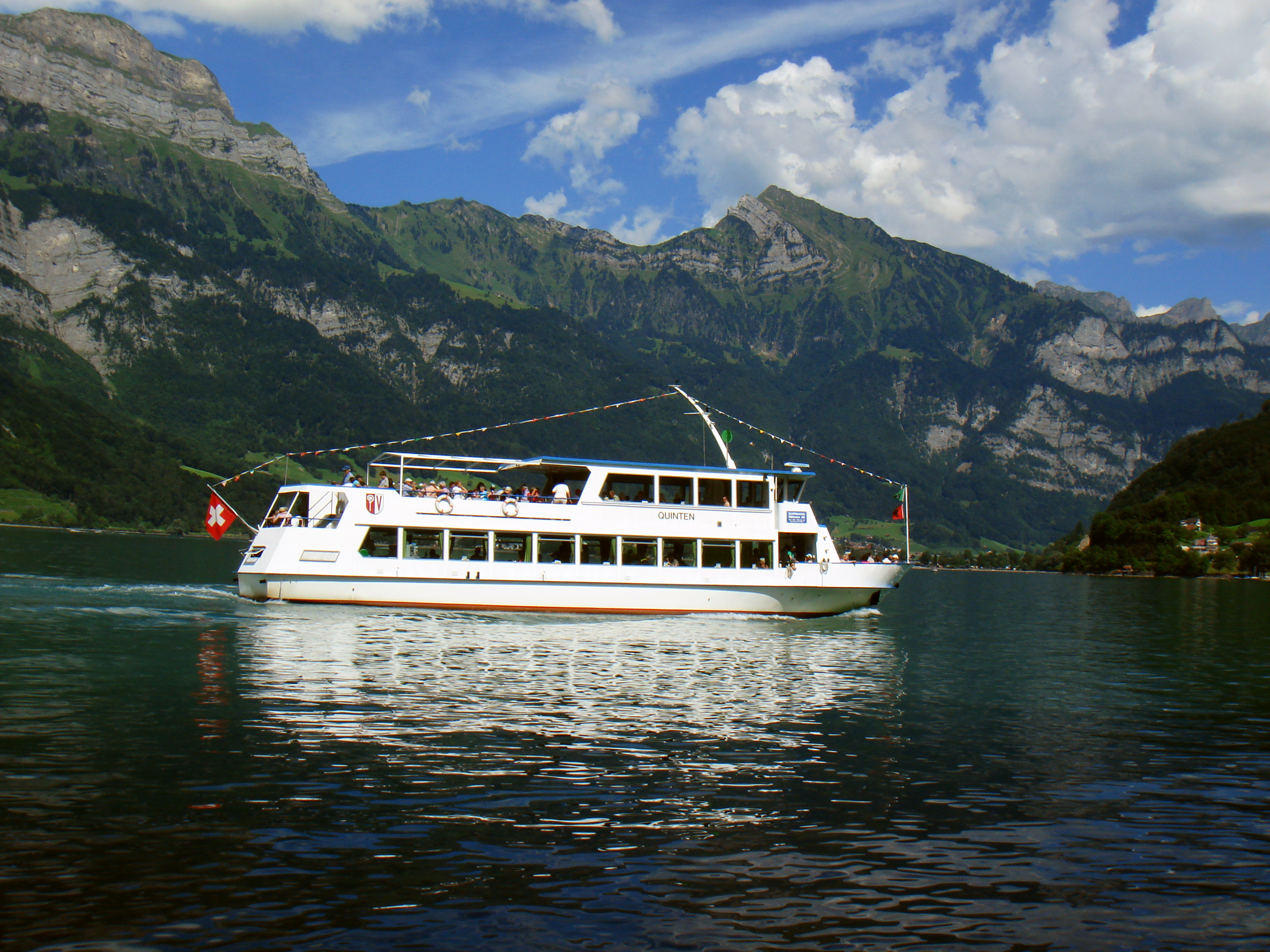
- The Quinten on the Walensee in 2010
- Industry: Transport
- Predecessor: Schiffsbetrieb Quinten
- Founded: 1984; 42 years ago
- Headquarters: Switzerland
- Area served: Walensee
- Website: walenseeschiff.ch

Schiffsbetrieb Walensee (lit. 'Walensee ship operation') is a transportation company in Switzerland. It operates a small fleet of ships on the Walensee, linking communities around the lake.

== Services ==
As of the December 2021 timetable change, the company operates two routes on the lake:

- Längskurs (lit. 'Longitudinal route'): seasonal (April–October) service between Weesen and Walenstadt, operating the full length of the lake.
- Querkurs (lit. 'Cross route'): year-round service between Murg and Quinten.

The landing stages on the southern coast of the lake are close to railway stations served by the S17 regional train. Unterterzen railway station is additionally served by the IR35 long-distance service to Chur and Bern, via Zurich. There are bus routes linking the landing stage in Weesen with Ziegelbrücke railway station, and the one in Walenstadt with Walenstadt railway station.

== See also ==
- Transport in Switzerland
