= Biasca railway station =

Railway station in Switzerland

Biasca
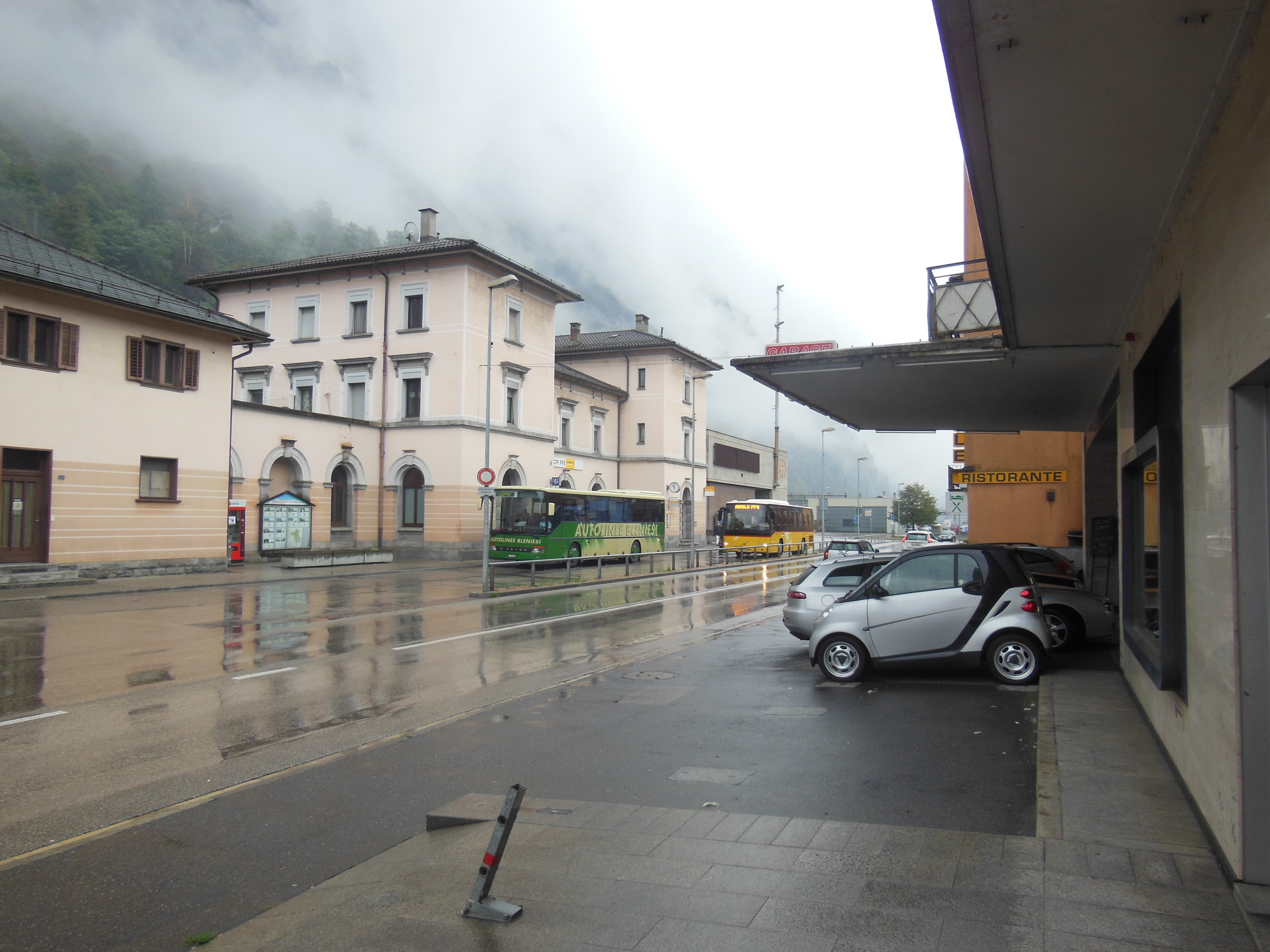
- The frontage of Biasca railway station, with Autolinee Bleniesi and Autopostale buses

General information
- Location: Via Bellinzona; Biasca; Switzerland
- Coordinates: 46°21′07″N 8°58′27″E
- Elevation: 293 m (961 ft)
- Owner: Swiss Federal Railways
- Line: Gotthard line
- Distance: 131.8 km (81.9 mi) from Immensee
- Train operators: Südostbahn; Treni Regionali Ticino Lombardia
- Connections: Autolinee Bleniesi bus services; Autopostale bus services

Other information
- Fare zone: 220 (arcobaleno)

Passengers
- 2018: 1,900 per weekday

Services
Preceding station	Südostbahn	Following station
Bodio TI towards Basel SBB	IR 26	Castione-Arbedo towards Locarno
Bodio TI towards Zürich HB	IR 46	Castione-Arbedo towards Locarno
Preceding station	TiLo	Following station
Bodio TI Limited service towards Airolo	S10	Castione-Arbedo towards Como San Giovanni
Bodio TI Limited service towards Airolo	S50	Castione-Arbedo towards Malpensa Aeroporto Terminal 2
Location

Biasca railway station (Italian: Stazione di Biasca) is a railway station in the Swiss canton of Ticino and municipality of Biasca. The station is on the original line of the Swiss Federal Railways Gotthard railway, at the foot of the southern ramp up to the Gotthard Tunnel.

The line through the Gotthard Base Tunnel, now used by most trains on the Gotthard route, diverges from the existing line to the south of Biasca station (but before Osogna), passing on the surface to the west of the town before entering the tunnel proper at Bodio. Biasca station can therefore only be served by trains on the slower, but much more scenic, original route.

Between 1906 and 1973, Biasca was the junction for the metre gauge Biasca–Acquarossa railway to Acquarossa in the Valle di Blenio.

== Services ==
As of the December 2021 timetable change, the following services stop at Biasca:

- InterRegio: hourly service between Locarno and Arth-Goldau; trains continue to Basel SBB or Zürich Hauptbahnhof.
- S10 / S50: half-hourly service to Mendrisio and hourly service to Chiasso, Como San Giovanni, or Malpensa Aeroporto Terminal 2. One train per day continues to Airolo.

The station is also served by bus services operated by Autopostale, including an hourly service between Bellinzona and Airolo that parallels the railway line, and Autolinee Bleniesi, who provide service to the Valle di Blenio.

== Gallery ==
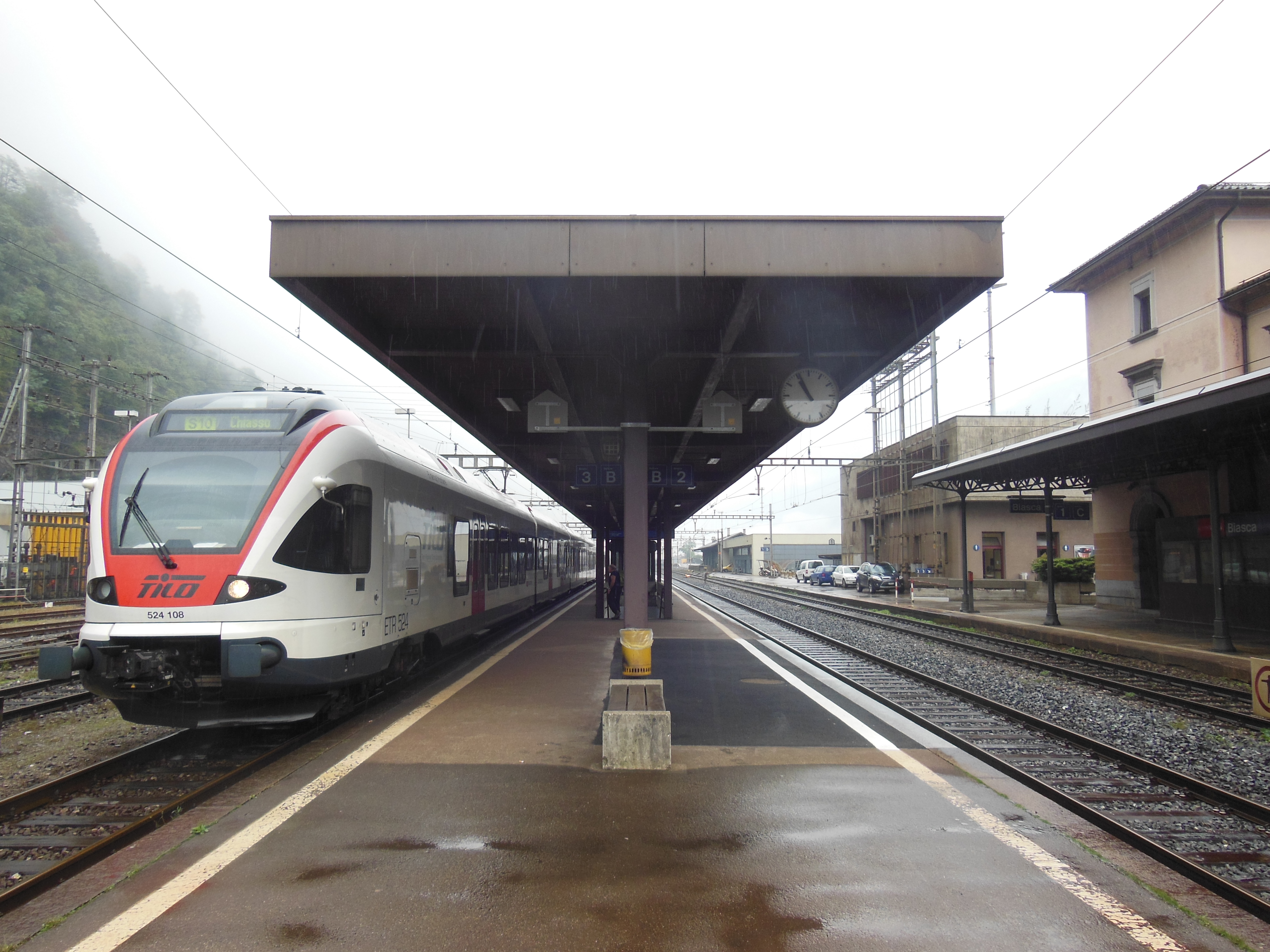
Station platforms with a terminating S10 laying over

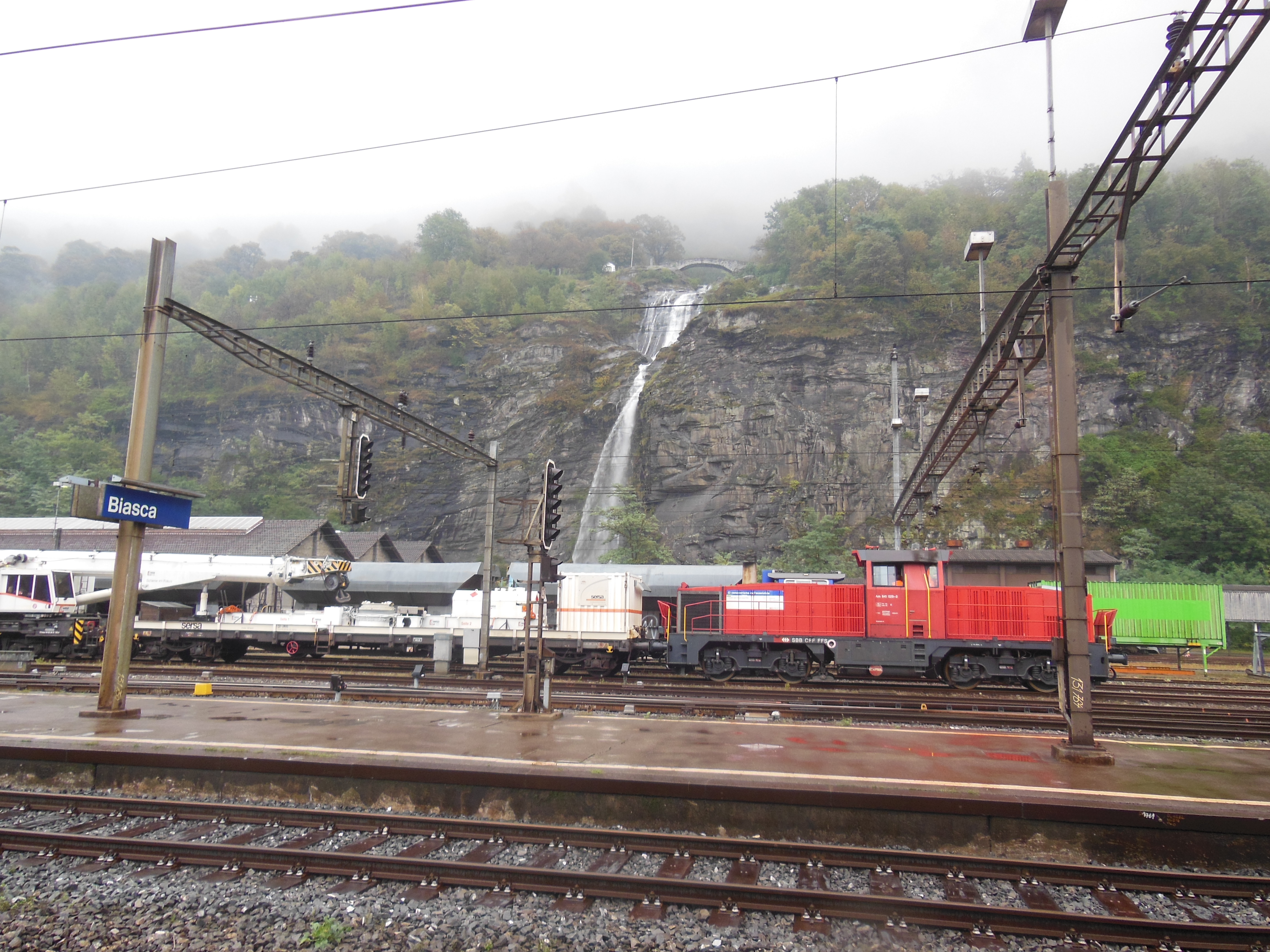
Station yard with waterfall
