= Seewen =

Seewen may refer to

- Seewen, Solothurn, a municipality in the canton of Solothurn, Switzerland
- Seewen, Schwyz, a village in the municipality of Schwyz in the canton of Schwyz, Switzerland
