= Faido railway station =

Railway station in Switzerland

Faido
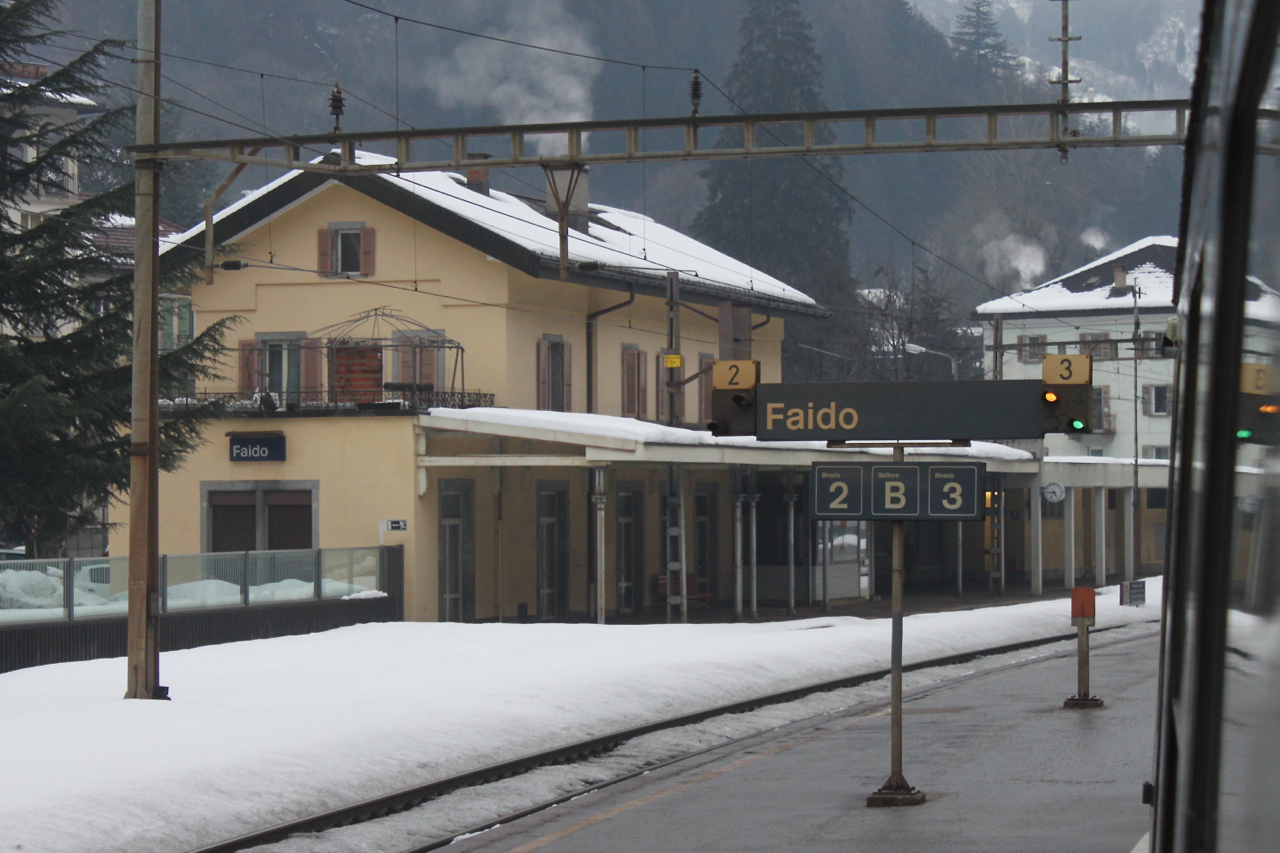
- The station building in 2014

General information
- Location: Faido; Switzerland
- Coordinates: 46°28′59″N 8°47′27″E
- Elevation: 755 m (2,477 ft)
- Owner: Swiss Federal Railways
- Line: Gotthard line
- Distance: 106.0 km (65.9 mi) from Immensee
- Train operators: Südostbahn; Treni Regionali Ticino Lombardia
- Connections: Autopostale bus lines

Other information
- Fare zone: 240 (arcobaleno)

Passengers
- 2018: 190 per weekday

Services
Preceding station	Südostbahn	Following station
Ambrì-Piotta towards Basel SBB	IR 26	Lavorgo towards Locarno
Ambrì-Piotta towards Zürich HB	IR 46	Lavorgo towards Locarno
Preceding station	TiLo	Following station
Ambrì-Piotta towards Airolo	S10 Limited service	Lavorgo towards Como San Giovanni
Ambrì-Piotta towards Airolo	S50 Limited service	Lavorgo towards Malpensa Aeroporto Terminal 2
Location

Faido railway station (Italian: Stazione di Faido) is a railway station in the Swiss canton of Ticino and municipality of Faido. The station is on the original line of the Swiss Federal Railways Gotthard railway, on the southern ramp up to the Gotthard Tunnel. Most trains on the Gotthard route now use the Gotthard Base Tunnel and do not pass through Faido station.

== Services ==
As of the December 2021 timetable change, the following services stop at Faido:

- InterRegio: hourly service between Locarno and Arth-Goldau; trains continue to Basel SBB or Zürich Hauptbahnhof.
- S10 / S50: one train per day to Airolo, Chiasso, Como San Giovanni, or Malpensa Aeroporto Terminal 1.

The station is also served by bus services operated by Autopostale, including an hourly service between Bellinzona and Airolo that parallels the railway line, together with other more local services.
