= Steinen railway station =

Steinen railway station or Steinen station could refer to:

- Steinen station (Germany), a railway station in Steinen, Germany
- Steinen railway station (Switzerland), a railway station in Steinen, Switzerland
