= Planzer =

Swiss transportation and logistics company

- Native name: Planzer Holding AG
- Company type: Private
- Founded: 1936; 89 years ago
- Founder: Max Planzer Sr.
- Key people: Nils Planzer; Severin Baer; Nicolas Baer
- Revenue: $1.2 billion (2022)
- Owner: Planzer family
- Number of employees: 5,600+ (2022)
- Website: planzer.ch

Planzer (/ˈplænzər/; respectively Planzer Holding AG) is a Swiss transportation and logistics company based in Seewen, Schwyz in Switzerland. The operational headquarters are located in Dietikon near Zurich. The concern is entirely owned and controlled by the extended Planzer family.

It employs 5,600+ people, including 350 apprentices, and owns 2,500+ trucks. In 2022, Planzer Holding AG, had an annual turnover of CHF 1,084 billion (about $1.2 billion in 2024). Planzer operates 63 locations in Switzerland and several more in Italy, Luxembourg, Germany, France, Liechtenstein as well as in Hong Kong. They are also a direct private competitor the state-owned Swiss Post as of 2024.

== History ==
In 2024, Planzer acquired the private postal service providers Quickpac and Quickmail. The acquisition followed a decision by the Swiss Competition Commission (Weko) to block an earlier attempt by Swiss Post to purchase the same firms. Quickpac is expected to be integrated under the "Planzer Paket" brand, while Quickmail will continue as a distinct organization.
