= Bodio TI railway station =

Railway station in Switzerland

Bodio TI
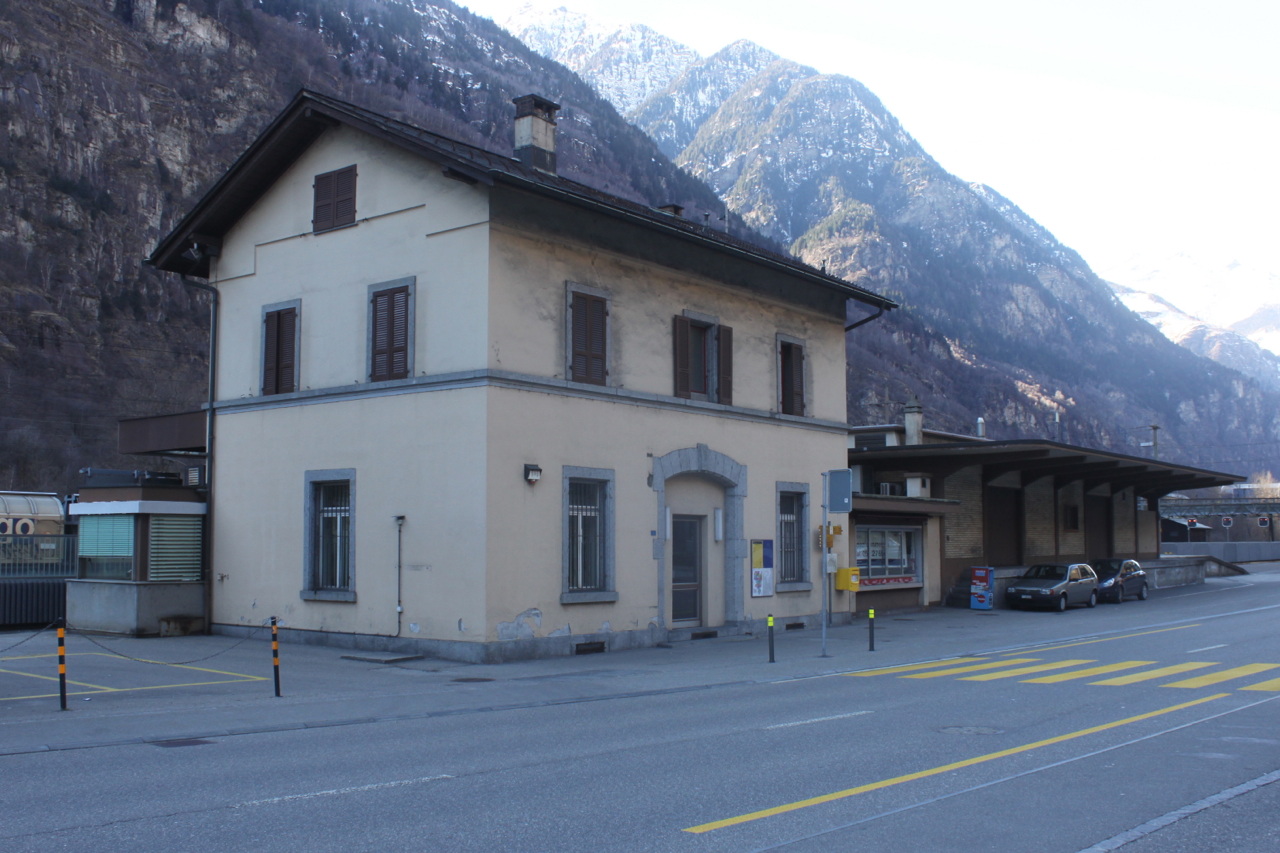
- The station building in 2014

General information
- Location: Via Stazione; Bodio, Giornico; Switzerland
- Coordinates: 46°22′49″N 8°54′24″E
- Elevation: 331 m (1,086 ft)
- Owner: Swiss Federal Railways
- Line: Gotthard line
- Distance: 125.5 km (78.0 mi) from Immensee
- Train operators: Südostbahn; Treni Regionali Ticino Lombardia
- Connections: Autopostale bus lines

Other information
- Fare zone: 220 and 230 (arcobaleno)

Passengers
- 2018: 160 per weekday

Services
Preceding station	Südostbahn	Following station
Lavorgo towards Basel SBB	IR 26	Biasca towards Locarno
Lavorgo towards Zürich HB	IR 46	Biasca towards Locarno
Preceding station	TiLo	Following station
Lavorgo towards Airolo	S10 Limited service	Biasca towards Como San Giovanni
Lavorgo towards Airolo	S50 Limited service	Biasca towards Malpensa Aeroporto Terminal 2
Location

Bodio TI railway station (Italian: Stazione di Bodio TI) is a railway station in the Swiss canton of Ticino and municipality of Giornico. The station is on the original line of the Swiss Federal Railways Gotthard railway, on the southern ramp up to the Gotthard Tunnel. Most trains on the Gotthard route now use of the Gotthard Base Tunnel and do not pass through or stop at the station. The southern portal of the base tunnel is southeast of the station.

== Services ==
As of the December 2021 timetable change, the following services stop at Bodio TI:

- InterRegio: hourly service between Locarno and Arth-Goldau; trains continue to Basel SBB or Zürich Hauptbahnhof.
- S10 / S50: one train per day to Airolo, Chiasso, Como San Giovanni, or Malpensa Aeroporto Terminal 1.

The station is also served by bus services operated by Autopostale, including an hourly service between Bellinzona and Airolo that parallels the railway line, together with other more local services.
