= Schwyz railway station =

Railway station in Schwyz, Switzerland

Schwyz
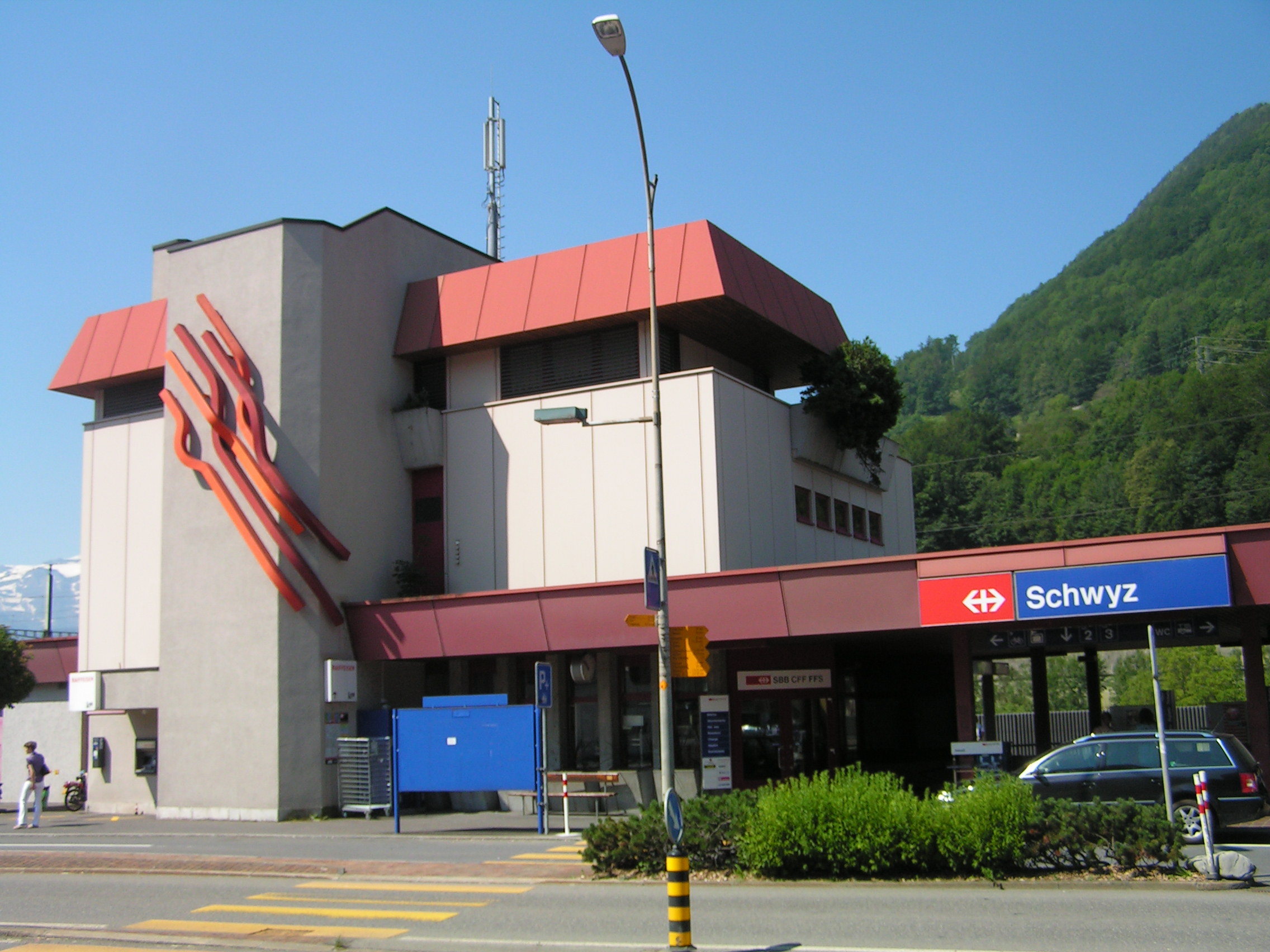
- The station building in 2010

General information
- Location: Bahnhofstrasse; Schwyz; Switzerland
- Coordinates: 47°01′35″N 8°37′56″E
- Elevation: 455 m (1,493 ft)
- Owner: Swiss Federal Railways
- Line: Gotthard line
- Distance: 17.0 km (10.6 mi) from Immensee
- Platforms: 2
- Tracks: 3
- Train operators: Südostbahn; Swiss Federal Railways
- Connections: AAGS buses

Other information
- Fare zone: 670 (Tarifverbund Schwyz)

History
- Opened: 1882; 144 years ago

Passengers
- 2018: 3,200 per weekday

Services
Preceding station	Südostbahn	Following station
Arth-Goldau towards Basel SBB	IR 26	Brunnen towards Locarno
Arth-Goldau towards Zürich HB	IR 46	Brunnen towards Locarno
Preceding station	Zug Stadtbahn	Following station
Steinen towards Baar Lindenpark	S2	Brunnen towards Erstfeld
Preceding station	Lucerne S-Bahn	Following station
Steinen towards Lucerne	S3	Brunnen Terminus
Location

Schwyz railway station (German: Bahnhof Schwyz) is a railway station in the municipality of Schwyz, the capital of the canton of Schwyz in Switzerland. Opened in 1882, it is owned and operated by the Swiss Federal Railways, and forms part of the Gotthard railway, which links northern Switzerland and Immensee with Chiasso and Italy, via the Gotthard Tunnel.

The station is located in the village of Seewen in the middle of the Schwyz valley, about 2 km (1.2 mi) northwest of the town centre, between the Grosser Mythen and the Urmiberg.

== History ==
Schwyz railway station was opened in 1882, as the Gotthardbahn began operations. When the Gotthardbahn was nationalised in 1909, the station came into the ownership of the SBB-CFF-FFS.

In 1900, the Schwyzer Strassenbahnen electric tramway opened their first line, from the station to the Schwyz Post stop in the town centre. In 1914 and 1915, the line was extended through the town centre to Brunnen railway station and the Brunnen ferry terminal. The line closed in 1963, and was replaced by bus services.

In 1979 and 1980, the entire station was redeveloped. The station building was demolished and replaced with the present, post-modern buildings. Also, the platform system was renewed, and the sidings removed.

== Facilities ==
The railway facilities at the station include four through tracks, three of which face a railway platform. However, only the island platform facing tracks 2 (towards Brunnen) and 3 (towards Steinen and Arth-Goldau) is used for scheduled passenger trains. The platform nearest the station building (Swiss Standard German: Hausperron), facing track 1, is only 100 metres (330 ft) long and has no regularly scheduled trains. Tracks 1 and track 4, which has no platform, are used for overtaking trains.

There are also still some sidings and connecting tracks, mainly for the Schwyzerland cheese factory, KIBAG, Arthur Weber Stahl and Zeughausareal Seewen.

== Services ==
As of the December 2020 timetable change, the following services stop at Schwyz:

- InterRegio: hourly service between Locarno and Arth-Goldau; trains continue to Basel SBB or Zürich Hauptbahnhof.
- Zug Stadtbahn S2: hourly service between Baar Lindenpark and Erstfeld.
- Lucerne S-Bahn S3: hourly service between Lucerne and Brunnen.

== Bus traffic ==
The bus station is next to the station building and has three bus platforms. Several bus routes operated by the Auto AG Schwyz company link the station with the Schwyz town centre in about five minutes:

- Line 1: Lauerz – Schwyz – Muotathal
- Line 3: Seewen – Ibach – Schwyz – Rickenbach

There are also buses linking the railway station with the valley station of the Rotenfluebahn to Rotenfluh.

== See also ==
- History of rail transport in Switzerland
- Rail transport in Switzerland

== Bibliography ==
- Moser, Beat; Pfeiffer, Peter (2004). SBB Gotthardbahn (in German). Fürstenfeldbruck, Germany: Eisenbahn-Journal (Verlagsgruppe Bahn GmbH). ISBN 3-89610-121-8.
