= Steinen railway station (Switzerland) =

Swiss railway station

Steinen
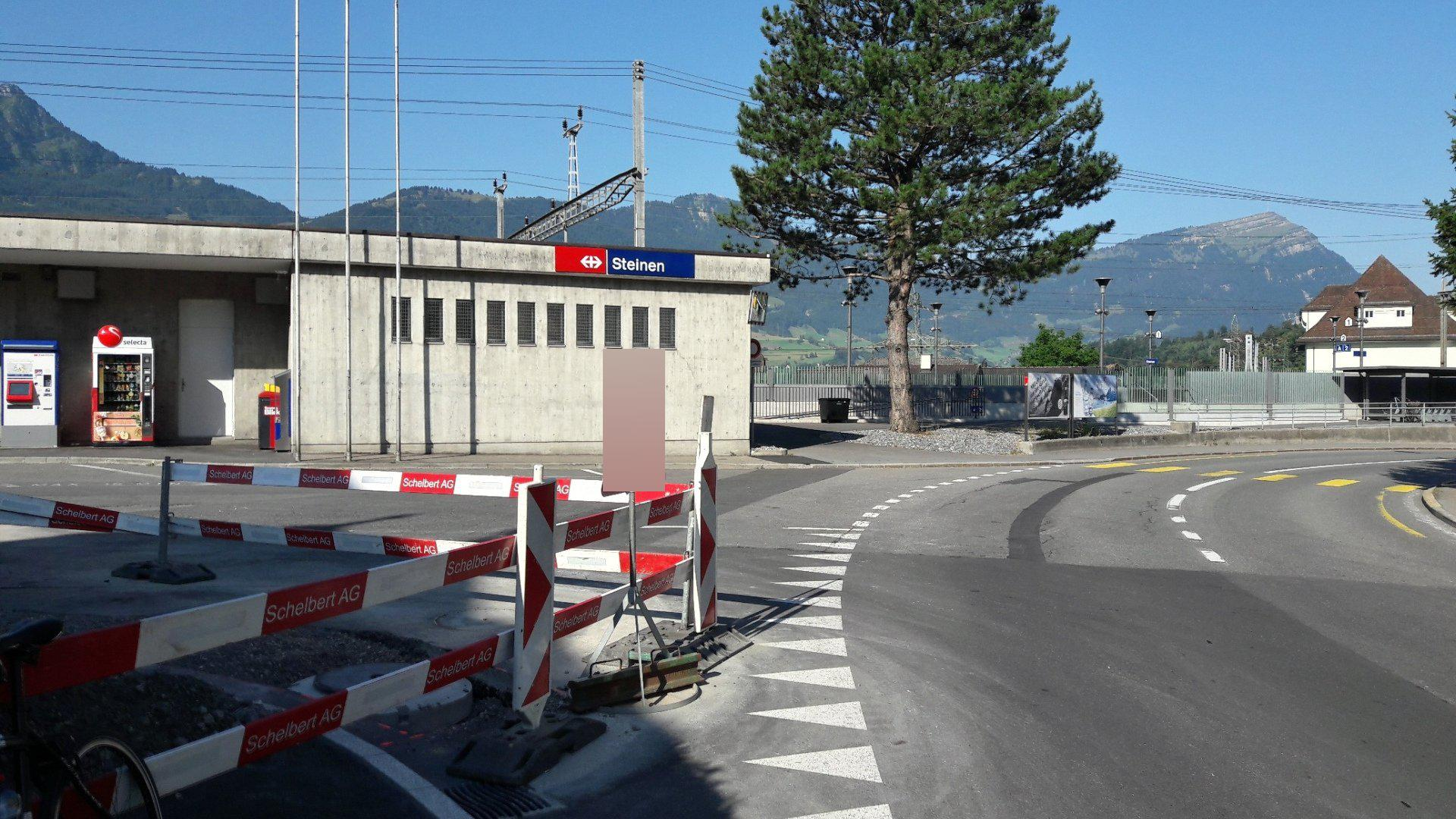
- The station building in 2018

General information
- Location: Steinen; Switzerland
- Coordinates: 47°02′52″N 8°36′27″E
- Elevation: 467 m (1,532 ft)
- Owner: Swiss Federal Railways
- Line: Gotthard line
- Distance: 13.9 km (8.6 mi) from Immensee
- Platforms: 2
- Tracks: 2
- Train operators: Swiss Federal Railways
- Connections: AAGS buses

Other information
- Fare zone: 670 and 674 (Tarifverbund Schwyz)

Passengers
- 2018: 670 per weekday

Services
Preceding station	Zug Stadtbahn	Following station
Arth-Goldau towards Baar Lindenpark	S2	Schwyz towards Erstfeld
Preceding station	Lucerne S-Bahn	Following station
Arth-Goldau towards Lucerne	S3	Schwyz towards Brunnen
Location

Steinen railway station (German: Bahnhof Steinen) is a railway station in the municipality of Steinen, in the Swiss canton of Schwyz. It is an intermediate stop on the standard gauge Gotthard line of Swiss Federal Railways. Steinen has two platforms serving two tracks.

== Services ==
As of the December 2020 timetable change, the following services stop at Steinen:

- Zug Stadtbahn S2: hourly service between Baar Lindenpark and Erstfeld.
- Lucerne S-Bahn S3: hourly service between Lucerne and Brunnen.
