= Lavorgo railway station =

Railway station in Switzerland

Lavorgo
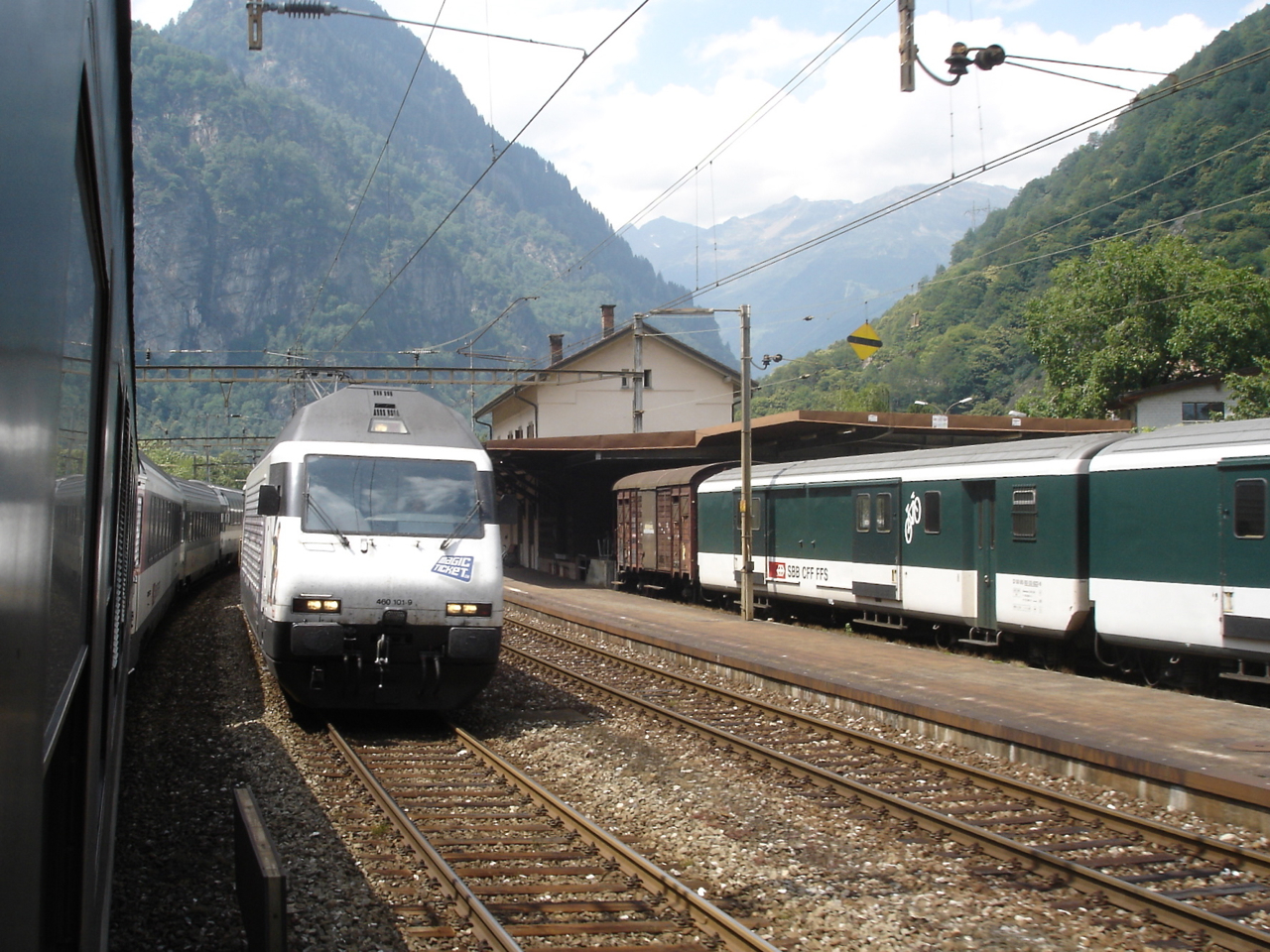
- An InterRegio passing by the station in 2007

General information
- Location: Faido; Switzerland
- Coordinates: 46°26′27″N 8°50′23″E
- Elevation: 615 m (2,018 ft)
- Owner: Swiss Federal Railways
- Line: Gotthard line
- Distance: 112.6 km (70.0 mi) from Immensee
- Train operators: Südostbahn; Treni Regionali Ticino Lombardia
- Connections: Autopostale bus lines

Other information
- Fare zone: 230 and 240 (arcobaleno)

Passengers
- 2018: 100 per weekday

Services
| Preceding station | Südostbahn | Following station |
|---|---|---|
| Faido towards Basel SBB | IR 26 | Bodio TI towards Locarno |
| Faido towards Zürich HB | IR 46 | Bodio TI towards Locarno |
| Preceding station | TiLo | Following station |
| Faido towards Airolo | S10 Limited service | Bodio TI towards Como San Giovanni |
| Faido towards Airolo | S50 Limited service | Bodio TI towards Malpensa Aeroporto Terminal 2 |
Location

Lavorgo railway station (Italian: Stazione di Lavorgo) is a railway station in the Swiss canton of Ticino and municipality of Faido. It takes its name from the nearby community of Lavorgo. The station is on the original line of the Swiss Federal Railways Gotthard railway, on the southern ramp up to the Gotthard Tunnel. Most trains on the Gotthard route now use the Gotthard Base Tunnel and do not pass through Lavorgo station.

== Services ==
As of the December 2021 timetable change, the following services stop at Lavorgo:

- InterRegio: hourly service between Locarno and Arth-Goldau; trains continue to Basel SBB or Zürich Hauptbahnhof.
- S10 / S50: one train per day to Airolo, Chiasso, Como San Giovanni, or Malpensa Aeroporto Terminal 1.

The station is also served by bus services operated by Autopostale, including an hourly service between Bellinzona and Airolo that parallels the railway line, together with other more local services.
