= Walenstadt railway station =

Railway station in Switzerland

Walenstadt
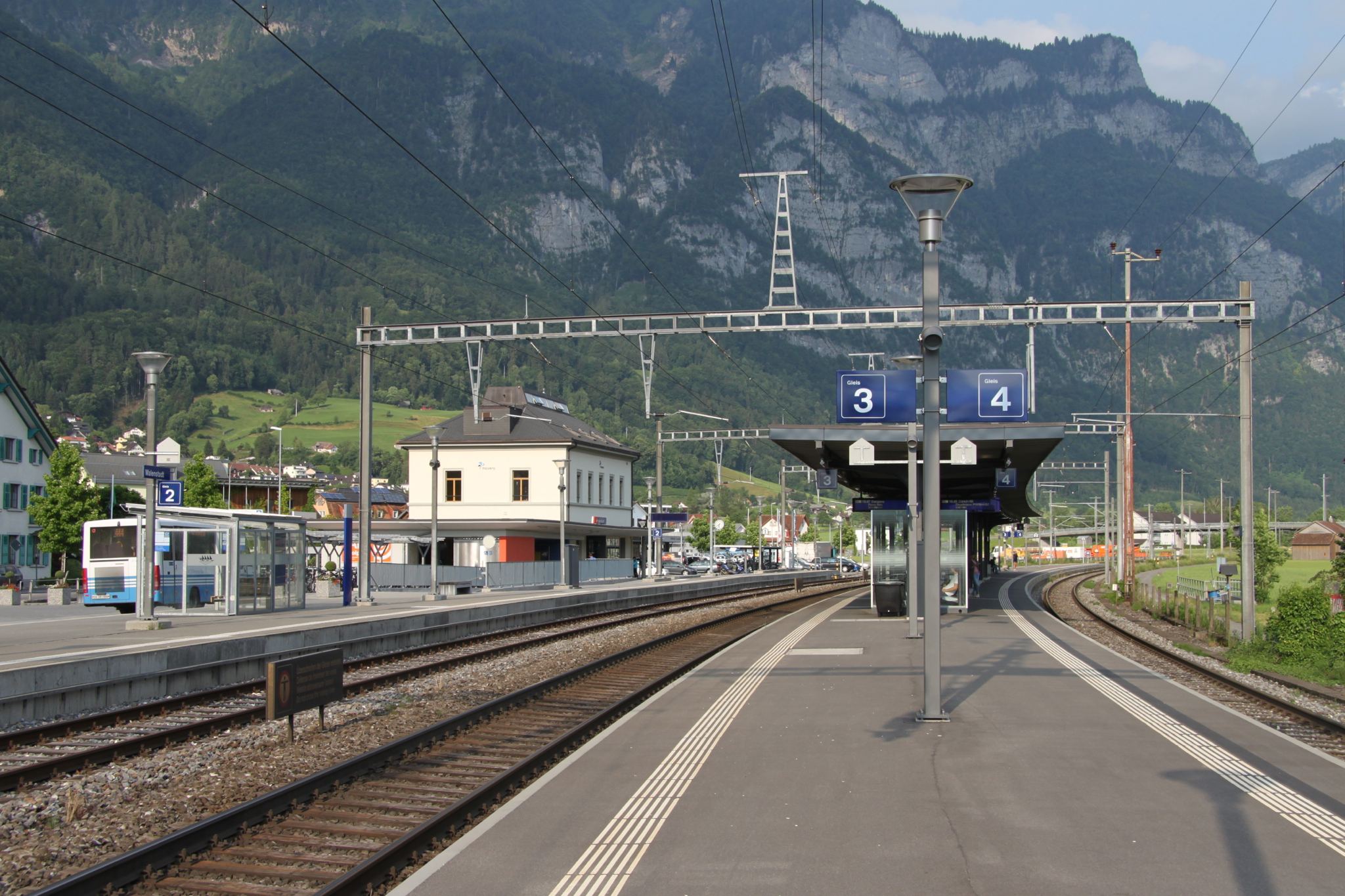
- The station building and platforms in 2015

General information
- Location: Walenstadt; Switzerland
- Coordinates: 47°07′N 9°19′E
- Owner: Swiss Federal Railways
- Line: Ziegelbrücke–Sargans line
- Distance: 13.5 km (8.4 mi) from Sargans
- Platforms: 1 island platform; 1 side platform
- Tracks: 3
- Train operators: Südostbahn
- Connections: Bus Sarganserland Werdenberg

Services
Preceding station	Südostbahn	Following station
Unterterzen towards Bern	IR 35 Aare Linth	Flums towards Chur
Preceding station	St. Gallen S-Bahn	Following station
Unterterzen towards Rapperswil	S17	Flums towards Sargans
Location
- Location within Switzerland Location within Canton of St. Gallen

Walenstadt railway station (German: Bahnhof Walenstadt) is a railway station in Walenstadt, in the Swiss canton of St. Gallen. It is an intermediate stop on the Ziegelbrücke–Sargans line.

== Services ==
As of the December 2023 timetable change, the following services stop at Walenstadt:

- hourly service between Bern and Chur via Zürich HB.
- St. Gallen S-Bahn S17: hourly service between Rapperswil and Sargans via Ziegelbrücke.

== Layout and connections ==
Walenstadt has a 169-metre (554 ft) side platform with one track (No. 2) and a 321-metre (1,053 ft)-long island platform with two tracks (Nos. 3–4). Bus Sarganserland Werdenberg operates bus services from the station to Walenstadtberg, Quarten, and Flums.
