= Rolle railway station =

Railway station in Rolle, Switzerland

Rolle
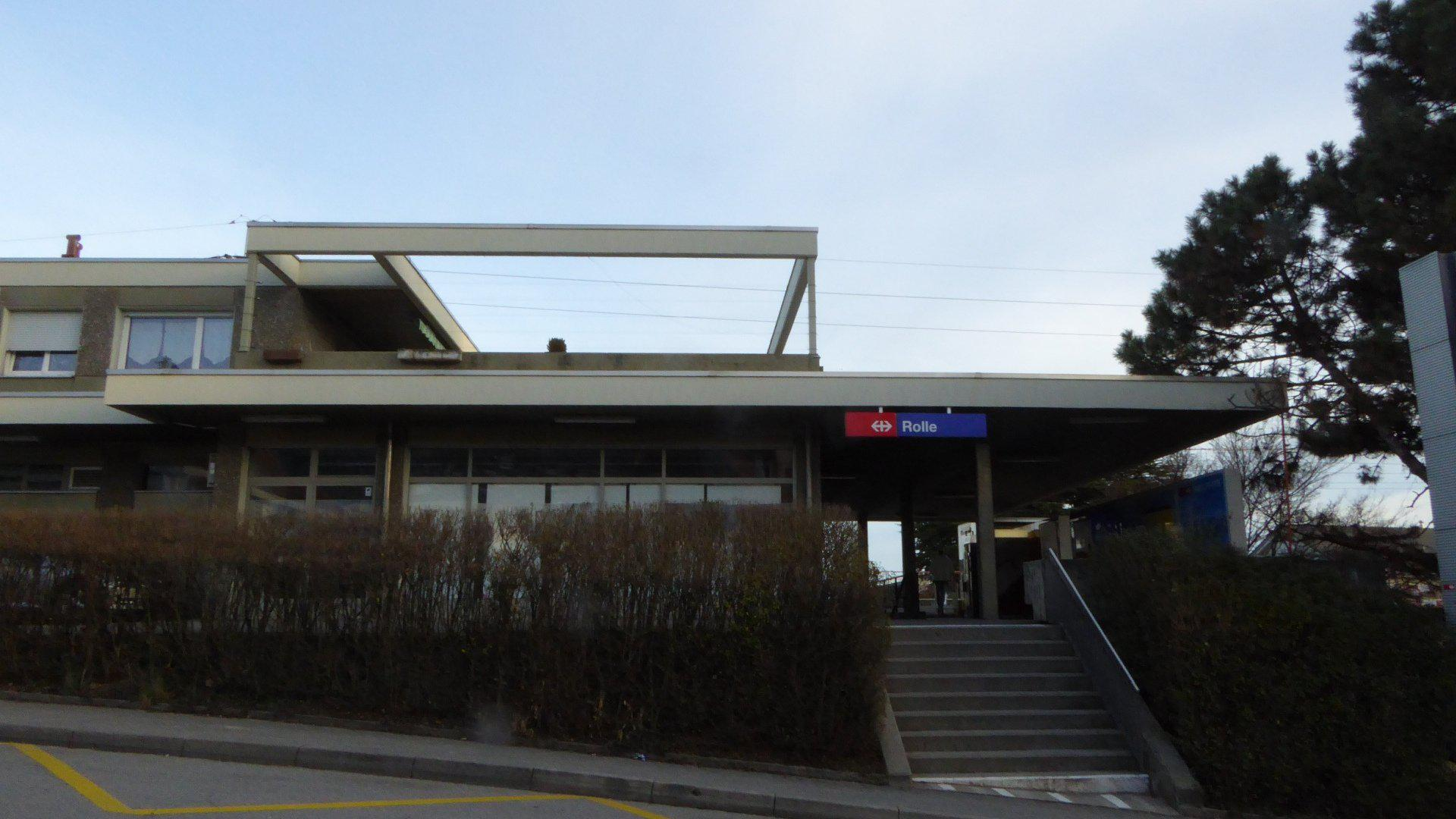
- The station building in 2018

General information
- Location: Rolle; Switzerland
- Coordinates: 46°27′46″N 6°20′11″E
- Elevation: 402 m (1,319 ft)
- Owner: Swiss Federal Railways
- Line: Lausanne–Geneva line
- Distance: 26.7 km (16.6 mi) from Lausanne
- Platforms: 2 side platforms
- Tracks: 2
- Train operators: Swiss Federal Railways
- Connections: CarPostal Suisse

Construction
- Parking: Yes (115 spaces)
- Cycle facilities: Yes (74 spaces)
- Accessible: Yes

Other information
- Station code: 8501033 (ROL)
- Fare zone: 25 (mobilis)

Passengers
- 2023: 5'200 per weekday (SBB)

Services
Preceding station	SBB CFF FFS	Following station
Gland towards Annemasse or Geneva Airport	RE33	Allaman towards St-Maurice or Martigny
Location

Rolle railway station (French: Gare de Rolle) is a railway station in the municipality of Rolle, in the Swiss canton of Vaud. It is an intermediate stop on the standard gauge Lausanne–Geneva line of Swiss Federal Railways.

== Layout and connections ==
Rolle has two 320-metre (1,050 ft) side platforms with two tracks (Nos. 1–2). CarPostal Suisse operates bus services from the station.

== Services ==
As of the December 2024 timetable change, the following services stop at Rolle:

- RegioExpress: half-hourly service (hourly on weekends) between Annemasse and St-Maurice and hourly service from St-Maurice to Martigny. On weekends, hourly service to Geneva Airport.
