= Ambrì-Piotta railway station =

Railway station in Switzerland

Ambrì-Piotta
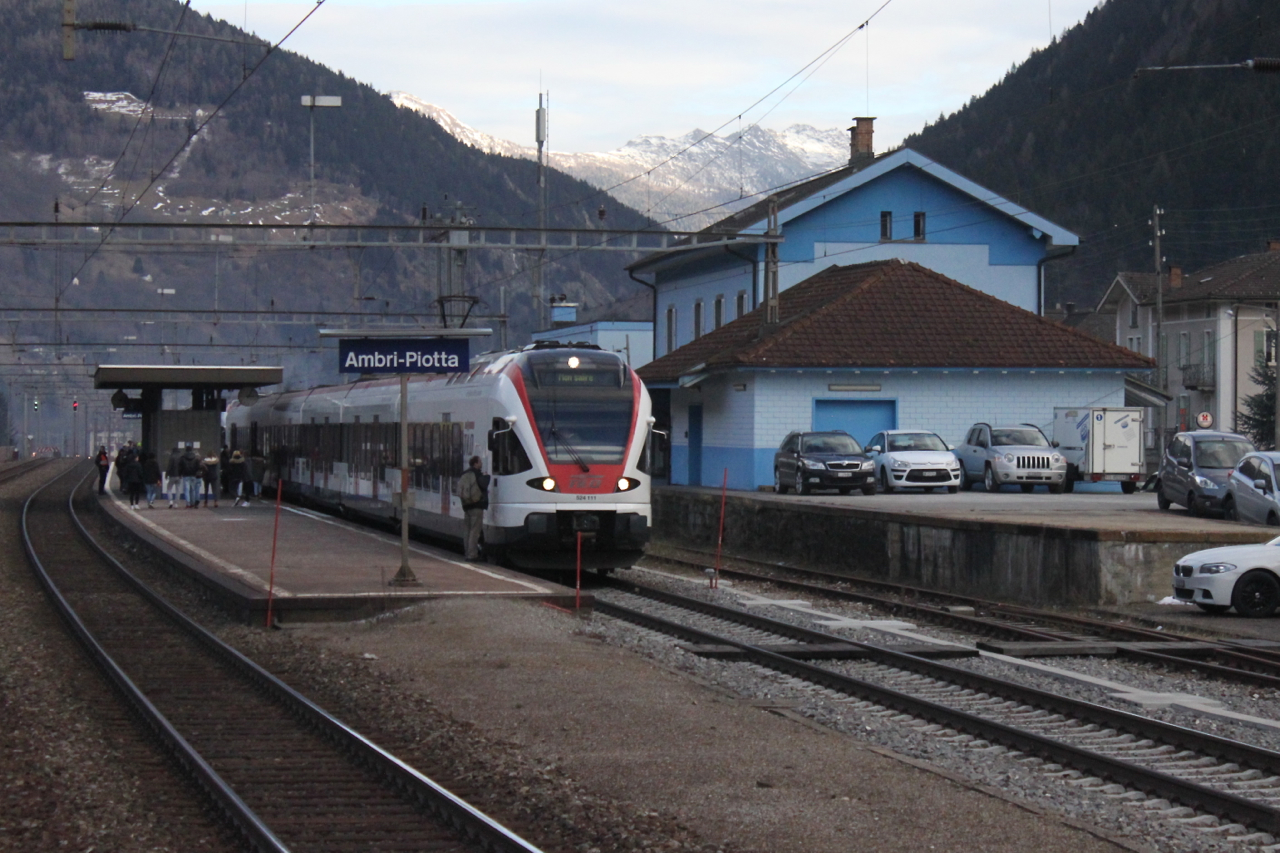
- SBB train at the station in 2013

General information
- Location: Quinto; Switzerland
- Coordinates: 46°30′39″N 8°41′24″E
- Elevation: 988 m (3,241 ft)
- Owner: Swiss Federal Railways
- Line: Gotthard line
- Distance: 93.0 km (57.8 mi) from Immensee
- Train operators: Südostbahn; Treni Regionali Ticino Lombardia
- Connections: Autopostale bus lines

Other information
- Fare zone: 244 (arcobaleno)

Passengers
- 2018: 130 per weekday

Services
| Preceding station | Südostbahn | Following station |
|---|---|---|
| Airolo towards Basel SBB | IR 26 | Faido towards Locarno |
| Airolo towards Zürich HB | IR 46 | Faido towards Locarno |
| Preceding station | TiLo | Following station |
| Airolo Terminus | S10 Limited service | Faido towards Como San Giovanni |
| Airolo Terminus | S50 Limited service | Faido towards Malpensa Aeroporto Terminal 2 |
Location

Ambrì-Piotta railway station (Italian: Stazione di Ambrì-Piotta) is a railway station in the Swiss canton of Ticino and municipality of Quinto. It takes its name from the nearby communities of Ambrì and Piotta. The station is on the original line of the Swiss Federal Railways Gotthard railway, on the southern ramp up to the Gotthard Tunnel. Most trains on the Gotthard route now use the Gotthard Base Tunnel and do not pass through Ambrì-Piotta station.

== Services ==
As of the December 2021 timetable change, the following services stop at Ambrì-Piotta:

- InterRegio: hourly service between Locarno and Arth-Goldau; trains continue to Basel SBB or Zürich Hauptbahnhof.
- S10 / S50: one train per day to Airolo, Chiasso, Como San Giovanni, or Malpensa Aeroporto Terminal 1.

The station is also served by an hourly Autopostale bus service between Bellinzona and Airolo that parallels the railway line.
