= Flums railway station =

Swiss railway station

Flums
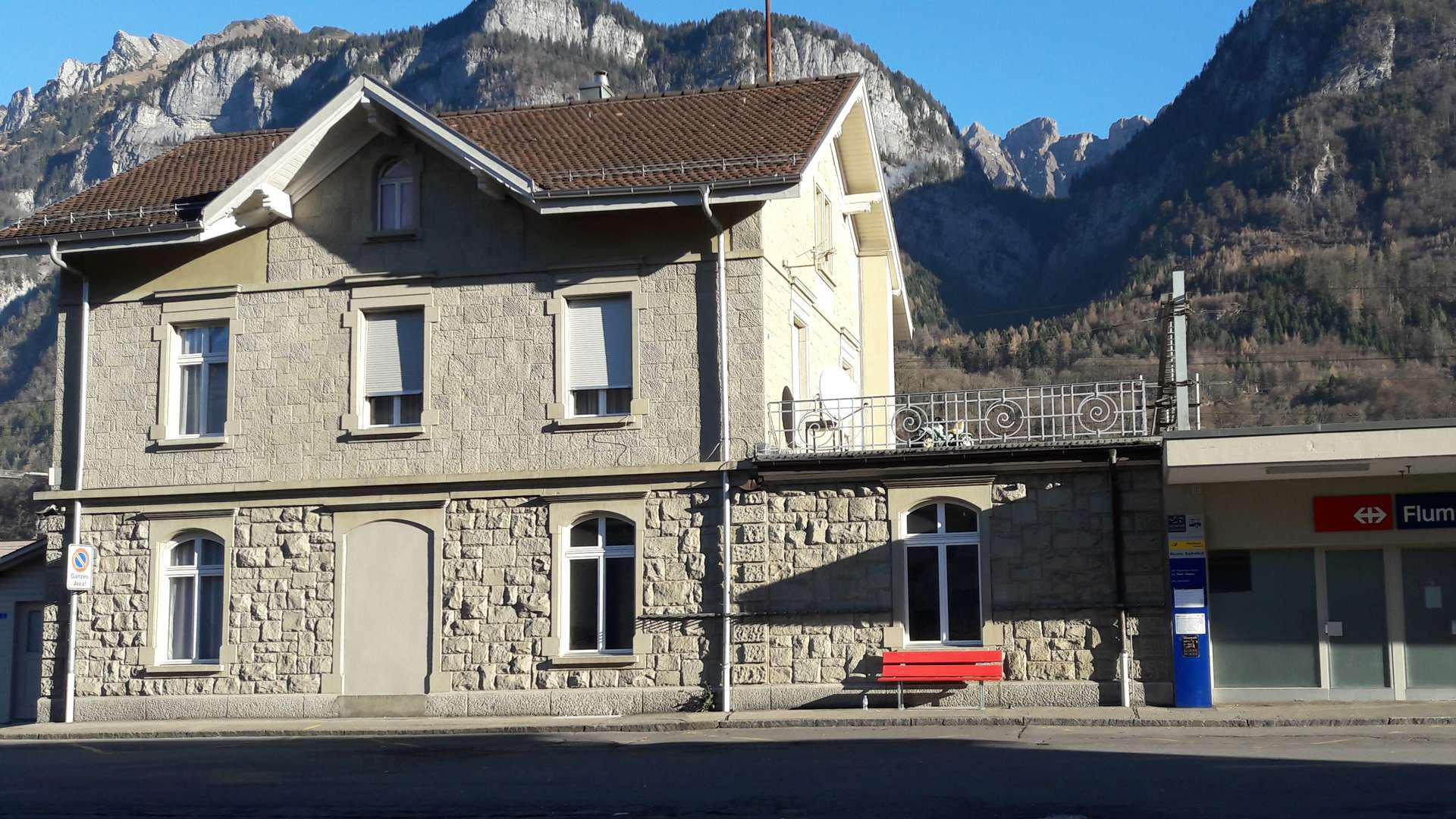
- The station building in 2018

General information
- Location: Flums; Switzerland
- Coordinates: 47°06′N 9°21′E
- Owner: Swiss Federal Railways
- Line: Ziegelbrücke–Sargans line
- Distance: 9.7 km (6.0 mi) from Sargans
- Platforms: 1 island platform
- Tracks: 2
- Train operators: Südostbahn
- Connections: Bus Sarganserland Werdenberg; PostAuto Schweiz

Services
Preceding station	Südostbahn	Following station
Walenstadt towards Bern	IR 35 Aare Linth	Sargans towards Chur
Preceding station	St. Gallen S-Bahn	Following station
Walenstadt towards Rapperswil	S17	Mels towards Sargans
Location
- Location within Switzerland Location within Canton of St. Gallen

Flums railway station (German: Bahnhof Flums) is a railway station in Flums, in the Swiss canton of St. Gallen. It is an intermediate stop on the Ziegelbrücke–Sargans line.

== Services ==
As of the December 2025 timetable change, the following services stop at Flums:

- : hourly service between Bern and Chur via Zürich HB.
- St. Gallen S-Bahn S17: hourly service between Rapperswil and Sargans via Ziegelbrücke.

== Layout and connections ==
Flums has a single 344-metre (1,129 ft)-long island platform with two tracks (Nos. 3–4). There is a non-passenger side platform located on the west side of the station. The station was modernized in 2025.

PostAuto Schweiz and Bus Sarganserland Werdenberg operate bus services from the station to Flumserberg, Walenstadt, Mels, and Sargans.
