= Gland railway station =

Railway station in Gland, Switzerland

Gland
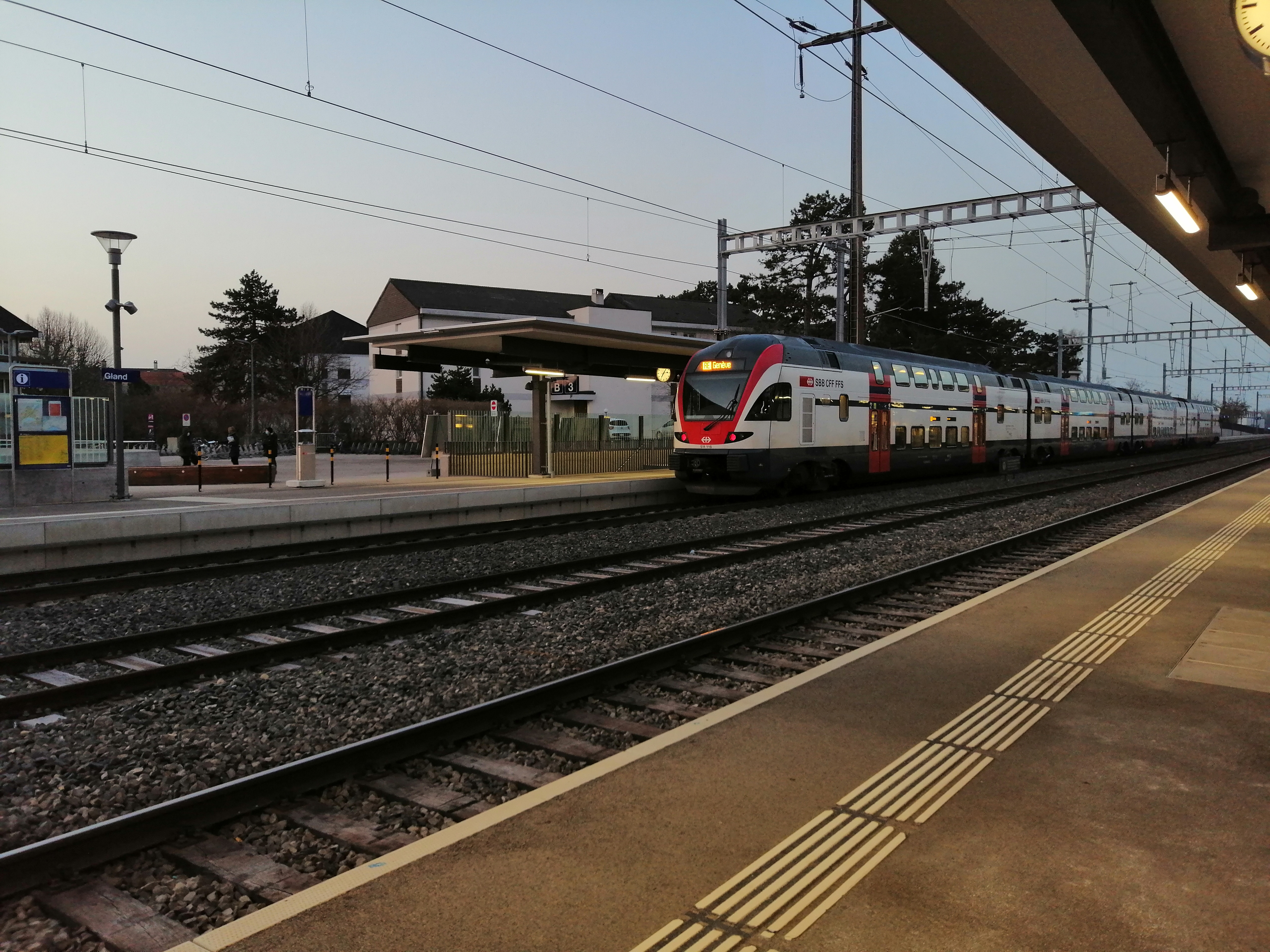
- A train at the station in 2021

General information
- Location: Gland; Switzerland
- Coordinates: 46°25′12″N 6°16′09″E
- Elevation: 415 m (1,362 ft)
- Owner: Swiss Federal Railways
- Line: Lausanne–Geneva line
- Distance: 33.8 km (21.0 mi) from Lausanne
- Platforms: 2 side platforms
- Tracks: 2
- Train operators: Swiss Federal Railways
- Connections: CarPostal SA; TPN

Construction
- Parking: Yes (164 spaces)
- Cycle facilities: Yes (132 spaces)
- Accessible: Yes

Other information
- Station code: 8501031 (GLA)
- Fare zone: 23 (mobilis)

Passengers
- 2023: 8'200 per weekday (SBB)

Services
Preceding station	SBB CFF FFS	Following station
Nyon towards Geneva Airport	IR 57	Morges towards Neuchâtel
Nyon towards Annemasse or Geneva Airport	RE33	Rolle towards St-Maurice or Martigny
Location

Gland railway station (French: Gare de Gland) is a railway station in the municipality of Gland, in the Swiss canton of Vaud. It is an intermediate stop on the standard gauge Lausanne–Geneva line of Swiss Federal Railways.

== Layout and connections ==
Gland has two 319-metre (1,047 ft) side platforms with two tracks (Nos. 1–2). CarPostal SA and Transports publics de la région nyonnaise (TPN) operate bus services from the station.

== Services ==
As of the December 2024 timetable change, the following services stop at Gland:

- InterRegio: limited service between Geneva Airport and Neuchâtel.
- RegioExpress: half-hourly service (hourly on weekends) between Annemasse and St-Maurice, and hourly service from St-Maurice to Martigny. On weekends, hourly service to Geneva Airport.
