= InterRegio =

Type of European interregional train service

The InterRegio, often shortened to IR, is a train category for mainly domestic train services in use in some European countries, with Swiss Federal Railways operating the most dense network. InterRegio trains are semi-fast long-distance trains with more stops and usually lower prices than more upscale long-distance trains such as the InterCity (IC).

== Austria ==
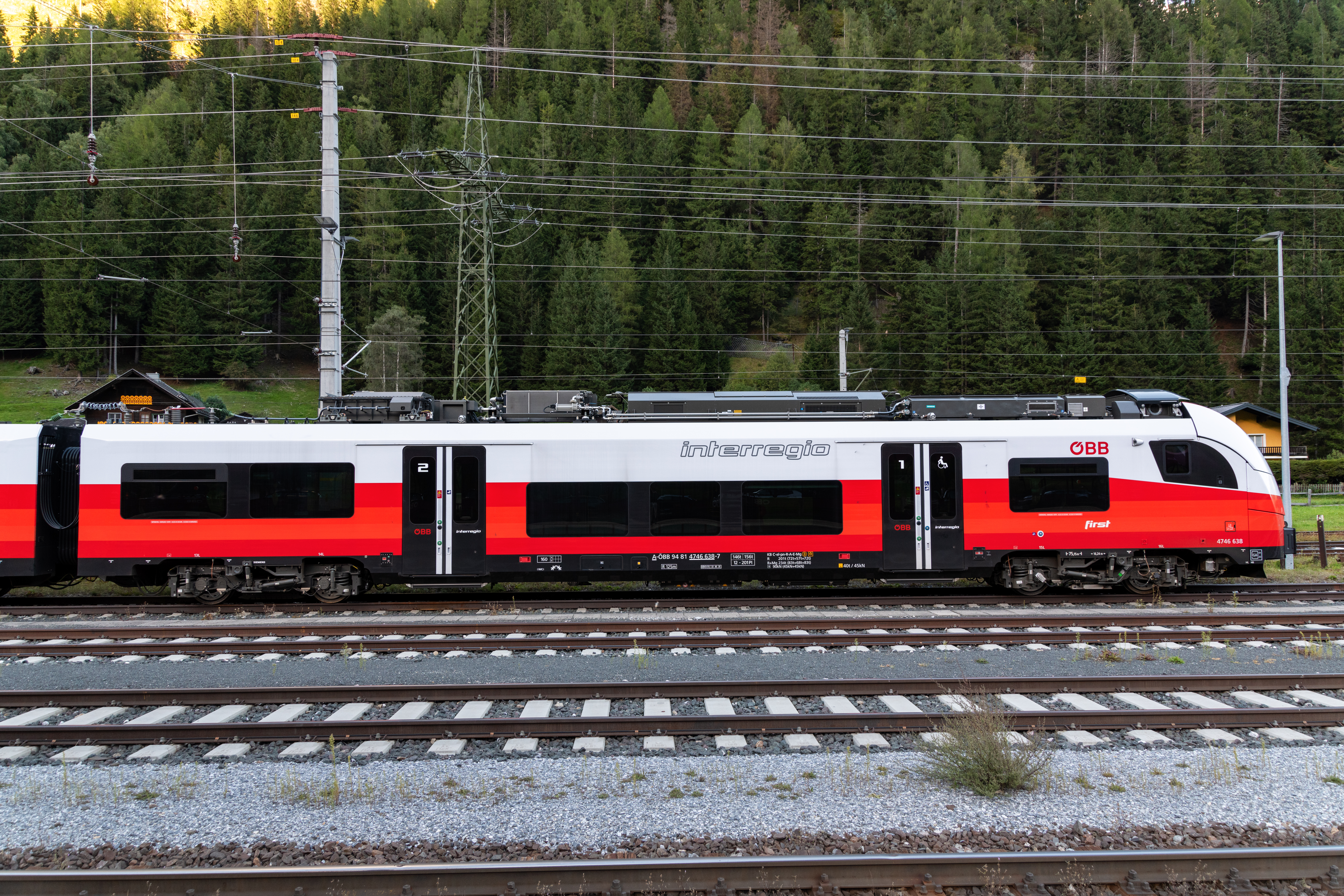
Interregio of ÖBB

Austrian Federal Railways (ÖBB) has introduced the Interregio category since August 2025 for long-distance services on routes that before were only served by regional trains and routes currently served by long-distance trains only. The main introduction is scheduled for December 2025.

As of 14 December 2025, the following Interregio services are in operation:

- IR Aichfeld: Klagenfurt – Unzmarkt – Bruck/Mur – Graz
  - runs hourly (every two hours to Graz, between Bruck an der Mur and Graz combined with the IR Ennstal–Pinzgau)
- IR Ennstal: Innsbruck – Wörgl – Bischofshofen – Selzthal – Bruck/Mur – Graz
  - runs every two hours (between Bruck an der Mur and Graz combined with the IR Aichfeld)
- IR Pinzgau: Wörgl – Bischofshofen – Salzburg
  - runs every two hours
- IR Pyhrn: Graz – Leoben – Selzthal – Linz
  - runs every two hours
- IR Mur-Drau: Graz – Spielfeld-Straß – Maribor (Slovenia)
  - runs hourly Monday to Friday, every two hours on Saturdays and Sundays

== Denmark ==
The InterRegio system was also introduced to the Danish railways in the early 1990s and became an alternative to the InterCity services, with no seat reservation required. However, unlike other countries, InterRegio trains in Denmark only operates on Fridays and Sundays, to support the heavy flow of passengers that travel on those days. These InterRegio services also have fewer stops than the InterCity services, which goes against the original InterRegio concept of long-distance trains with more local stops. There are no specific rules for the composition for these trains, and both old and new material has been used for InterRegio services.

== Hungary ==
The InterRégió trains were introduced in Hungary on 12 December 2009 (16 years ago). InterRégió trains run mainly on regional lines, but their function is national as well. The trains operate along the lines Sárbogárd–Szekszárd–Baja and Kecskemét–Baja–Dombóvár. InterRégió trains use air-conditioned MÁV 6341 DMU-s which were built by the Russian Metrovagonmash.

== Poland ==
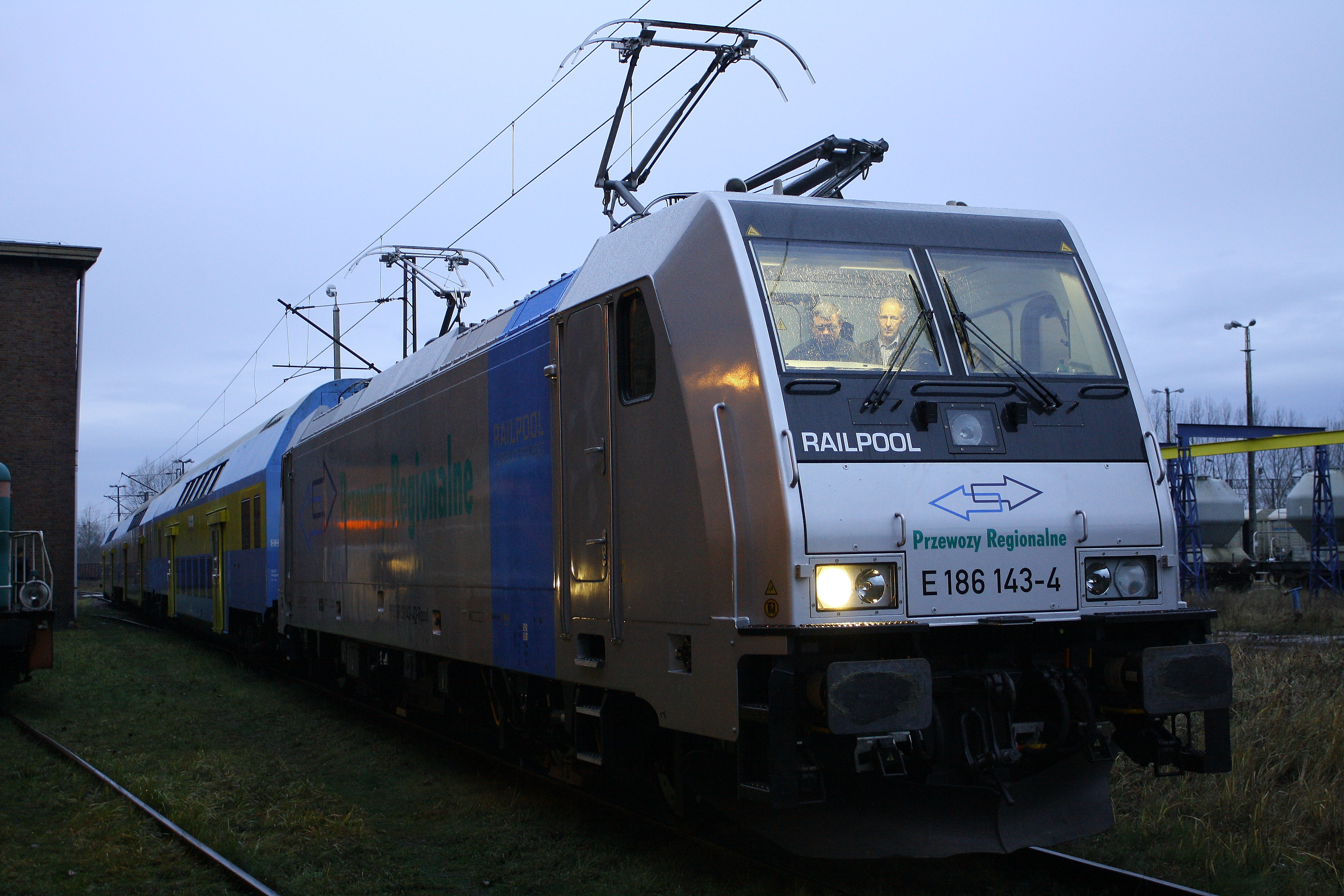
An EU43 (Bombardier TRAXX) locomotive with a Bydgoszcz-Warsaw InterRegio train

In Poland, interREGIO trains were introduced by Polregio (PR) in spring of 2009 (17 years ago), the first IR train connecting Białystok with Warsaw. The fare is similar as TLK-branded fast trains of PKP Intercity.

In the beginning these trains operated mostly on Fridays and Sundays along the routes: Wrocław-Kraków, Kraków-Przemyśl, Poznań-Olsztyn, Poznań-Warsaw and Bydgoszcz-Warsaw. Since June 2009 there are more interREGIO trains on routes; most of them are available through the whole week, some of them only on weekends. More routes were introduced, some of which are especially made for students, like Kielce-Częstochowa-Wrocław.

InterREGIO in Poland mostly uses older electric multiple units (usually ED72, EN71 and EN57), with newer units on some routes (ED73 and ED59 between Warsaw and Łódź, 14WE between Kraków and Warsaw). Some IR trains are serviced with single- and/or double-decker cars and locomotives.

As of 1 January 2009, all IR trains in Poland are second class-only, even though PR's regulations include a first-class fare for interREGIO trains and in service are first-class coaches, yet declassified.

On 3 March 2012, the Szczekociny train collision occurred, with 15 deaths and 50 injured.

Since 1 September 2015 IR trains are only on routes Łódź – Warszawa and Ełk – Grodno (Belarus), due to company's economics and restructuring. The rest were withdrawn or replaced by Twoje Linie Kolejowe express trains.

== Portugal ==
Portugal's national railway company Comboios de Portugal (CP) operates some Interregionais, which before 2001 were known as "Directos" or "Semi-Directos". These trains offer a faster option than regional trains but slower than intercity trains. They operate along the lines Porto-Régua-Pocinho, Figueira da Foz-Porto-Valença, Porto-Coimbra, Lisbon-Tomar, Lisbon-Caldas da Rainha and Caldas da Rainha-Coimbra. The Interregional service is operated by CP Regional using CP 2240 EMU-s, Spanish rented CP 592 DMU-s and locomotives CP 2600 with Arco coaches bought to Renfe in 2020 and refurbished by Comboios de Portugal.

== Switzerland ==
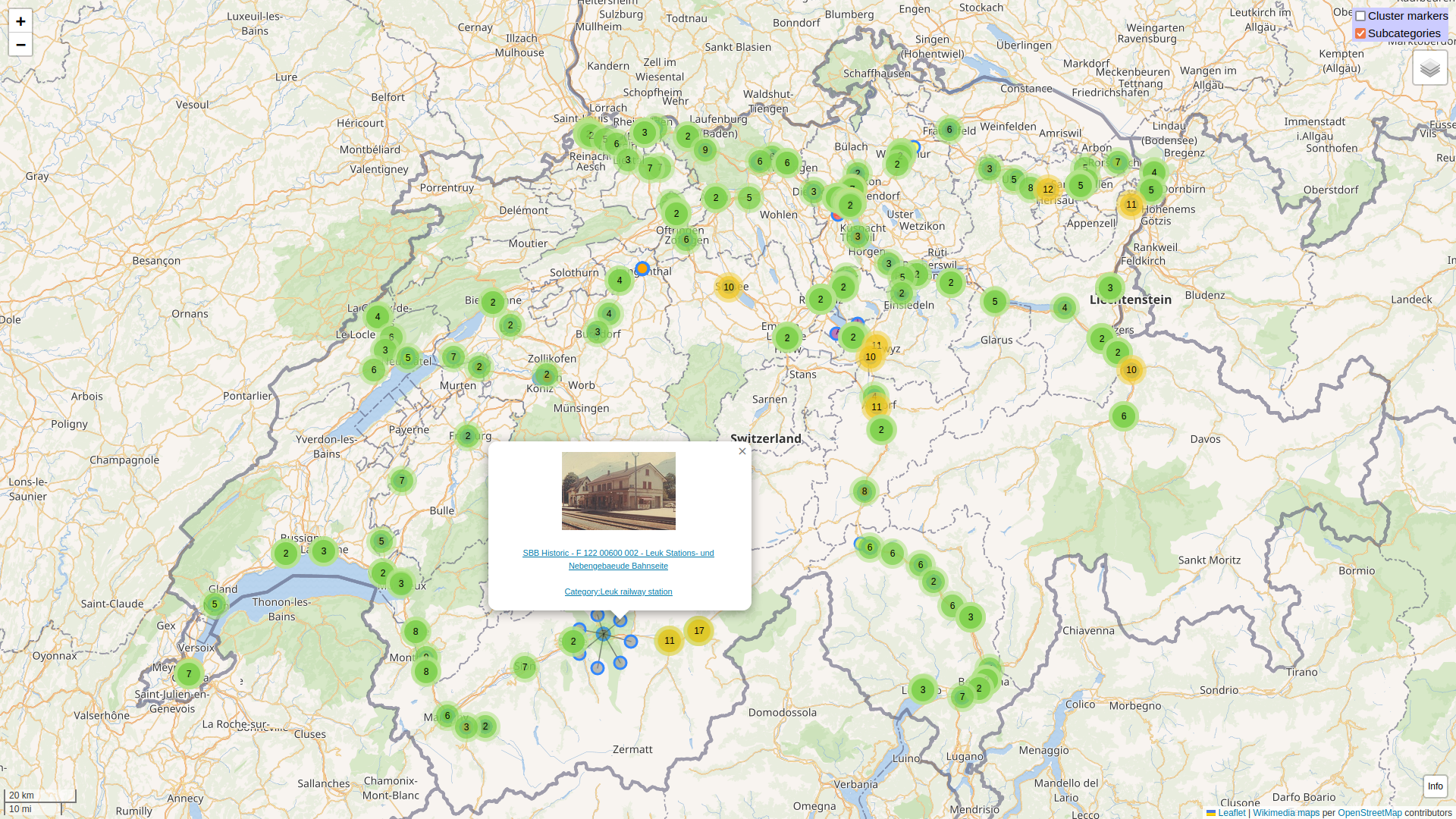
InterRegio stations in Switzerland (through locations of geocoded photos on Wikimedia Commons)

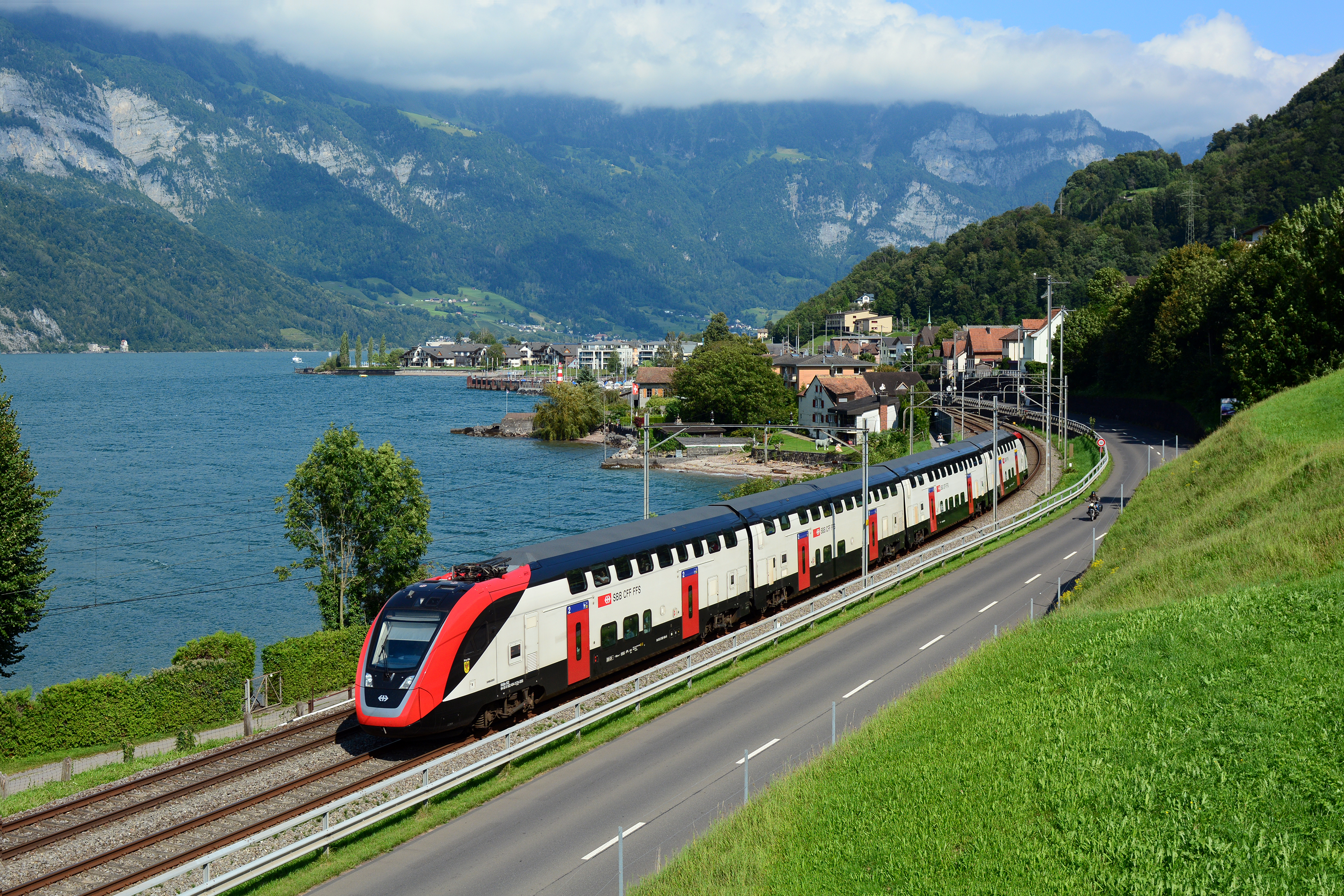
SBB RABe 502 InterRegio train passing by Lake Walen (Walensee)

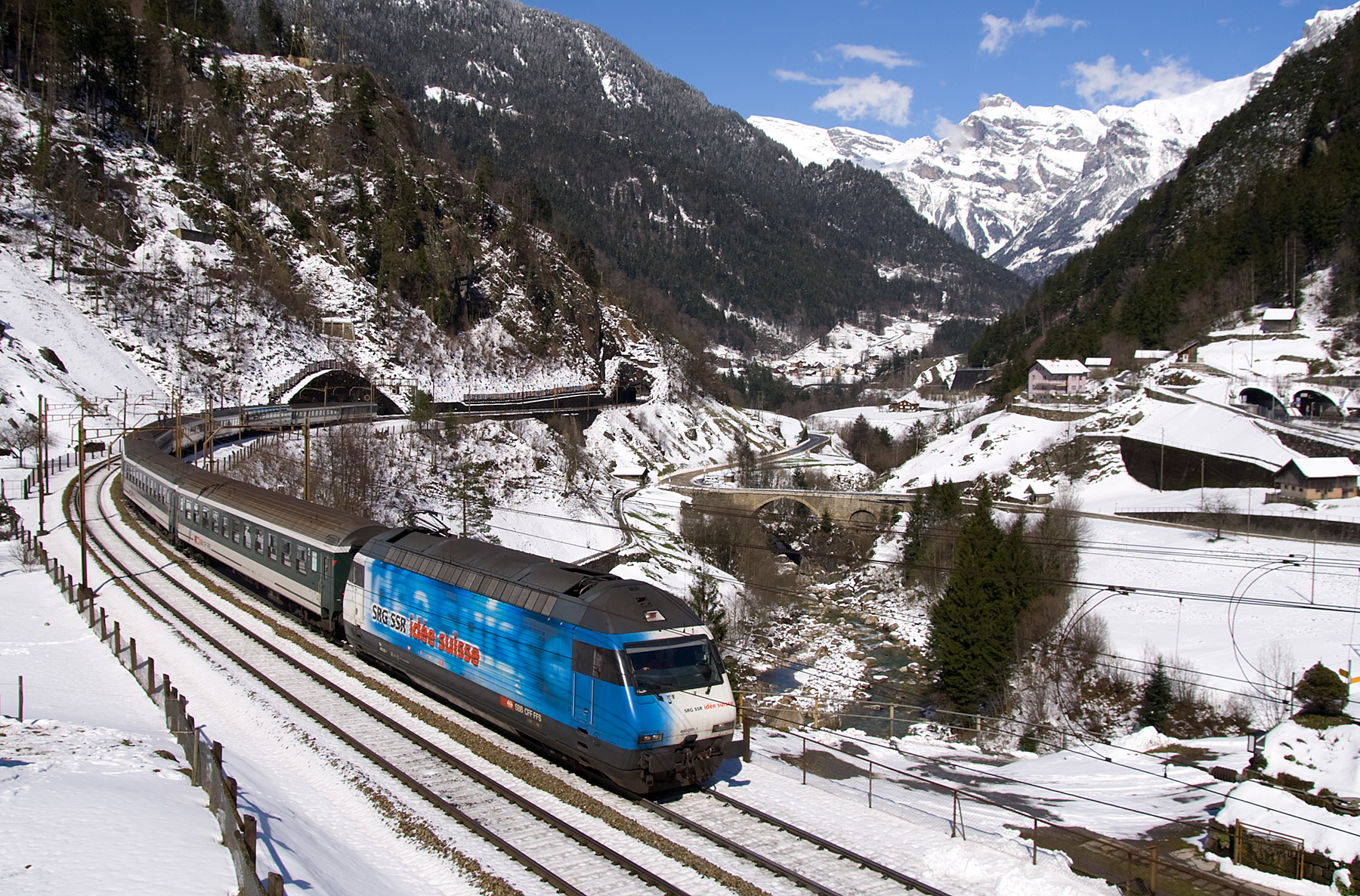
Former Re 460-hauled InterRegio train in the Swiss Alps (Gotthard Railway)

The InterRegio in Switzerland was first introduced in 1997 (29 years ago). They replaced some of the former fast trains with their own identity. InterRegio trains run from region to region within Switzerland. One service extends to the German city of Konstanz, just across the border.

InterRegio trains are now very commonplace in Switzerland. The abbreviation is IR in a 45°-edgy font, white letters on red ( ). Since the early 2020s, most IR services are numbered and each has a distinct colour. Some InterRegio trains are named.

The ICN runs as an InterCity (IC) train but sometimes with halt frequencies in the same manner as an IR (Geneva/Lausanne-St. Gallen/Basel route). When ICN services first began on 28 May 2000, the ICN was placed as an InterRegio train. As of 2025, SBB Re 460-hauled IC 2000 cars and RABe 511 or RABe 502 EMUs operate as IR services on several routes, while some routes are operated by SOB RABe 526, BLS RABe 528 or other.

As of the December 2024 timetable change, the following InterRegio services exist, operated by SBB CFF FFS, BLS, RhB and SOB:

SBB CFF FFS

- : Sargans – Buchs SG – Altstätten SG – Heerbrugg – St. Margrethen – Rorschach – St. Gallen – Gossau – Flawil – Uzwil – Wil SG – Winterthur – Zürich Airport – Zürich Oerlikon – Zürich HB
- : Lucerne – Sursee – Zofingen – Bern – Fribourg/Freiburg – Romont FR – Palézieux – Lausanne – Morges – Nyon – Geneva – Geneva Airport
- : Zürich HB – Baden – Brugg AG – Aarau – Olten – Bern
- : Basel SBB – Liestal – Sissach – Gelterkinden – Olten – Zofingen – Sursee – Luzern
- : Basel SBB – Rheinfelden – Stein-Säckingen – Frick – Brugg AG – Baden – Dietikon – Zürich Altstetten – Zürich HB
- : Basel SBB – Liestal – Sissach – Aarau – Lenzburg – Zürich HB
- : Zürich HB – Olten – Oensingen – Solothurn – Grenchen Süd – Biel/Bienne
- : Geneva Airport – Geneva – Nyon – Gland – Morges – Yverdon-les-Bains – Neuchâtel
- : Zürich HB – Zug – Luzern
- : Konstanz – Kreuzlingen – Weinfelden – Frauenfeld – Winterthur – Zürich Airport – Zürich HB – Thalwil – Baar – Zug – Rotkreuz – Lucerne
- : Geneva Airport – Geneva – Renens VD – Lausanne – Vevey – Montreux – Aigle – St-Maurice – Martigny – Sion – Sierre/Siders – Leuk – Visp – Brig
- : Geneva Airport – Geneva – Nyon – Morges – Renens VD – Lausanne – Vevey – Montreux – Aigle – Martigny – Sion – Sierre/Siders – Leuk – Visp – Brig

BLS

- : Bern – Burgdorf – Wynigen – Herzogenbuchsee – Langenthal – Olten
- : Basel SBB – Laufen – Delémont – Moutier – Grenchen Nord – Biel/Bienne
- : Bern – Lyss – Biel/Bienne
- : Bern – Kerzers – Ins – Neuchâtel – Chambrelien – Les Geneveys-sur-Coffrane – Les Hauts-Geneveys – La Chaux-de-Fonds

RhB

- IR 38: Chur – Reichenau-Tamins – Thusis – Tiefencastel – Filisur – Bergün/Bravuogn – Preda – Spinas – Samedan – Celerina – St. Moritz

SOB

- (Alpenrhein-Express): Chur – Landquart – Maienfeld – Bad Ragaz – Sargans – Buchs SG – Altstätten SG – Heerbrugg – St. Margrethen – Rorschach – St. Gallen
- IR Voralpen-Express Lucerne – Luzern Verkehrshaus – Meggen Zentrum – Küssnacht am Rigi – Arth-Goldau – Rothenthurm – Biberbrugg – Pfäffikon SZ – Rapperswil – Uznach – Wattwil – Herisau – St. Gallen
- (Treno Gottardo): Basel SBB – Olten – Lucerne – Arth-Goldau – Schwyz – Brunnen – Flüelen – Altdorf UR – Erstfeld – Göschenen – Airolo – Ambri-Piotta – Faido – Lavorgo – Bodio TI – Biasca – Castione-Arbedo – Bellinzona – Cadenazzo – Tenero – Locarno
- (Aare–Linth): Bern – Burgdorf – Herzogenbuchsee – Langenthal – Olten – Zürich Altstetten – Zürich HB – Thalwil – Wädenswil – Pfäffikon SZ – Siebnen-Wangen – Ziegelbrücke – Unterterzen – Walenstadt – Flums – Sargans – Bad Ragaz – Maienfeld – Landquart – Chur
- (Treno Gottardo): Zürich HB – Zug – Arth-Goldau – Schwyz – Brunnen – Flüelen – Altdorf UR – Erstfeld – Göschenen – Airolo – Ambri-Piotta – Faido – Lavorgo – Bodio TI – Biasca – Castione-Arbedo – Bellinzona – Cadenazzo – Tenero – Locarno

== Countries with defunct InterRegio services ==
=== Belgium ===
In Belgium, InterRegio (IR) trains were slower than the fast IC trains, and usually called at more stations along a route. Their journey was usually not as long as IC trains, but still traveled further than the local (L) trains. Most IR trains had hourly frequencies, some having only services every two hours (although this is mostly true only for weekend services). All trains in Belgium shared the same cost structure, so taking an IR train cost the same as an IC or L train for the same route. The only difference lay in the number of station stops they called at. In December 2014 the InterRegio was withdrawn, InterRegio lines were either converted to InterCity or local train or cancelled completely.

=== Germany ===
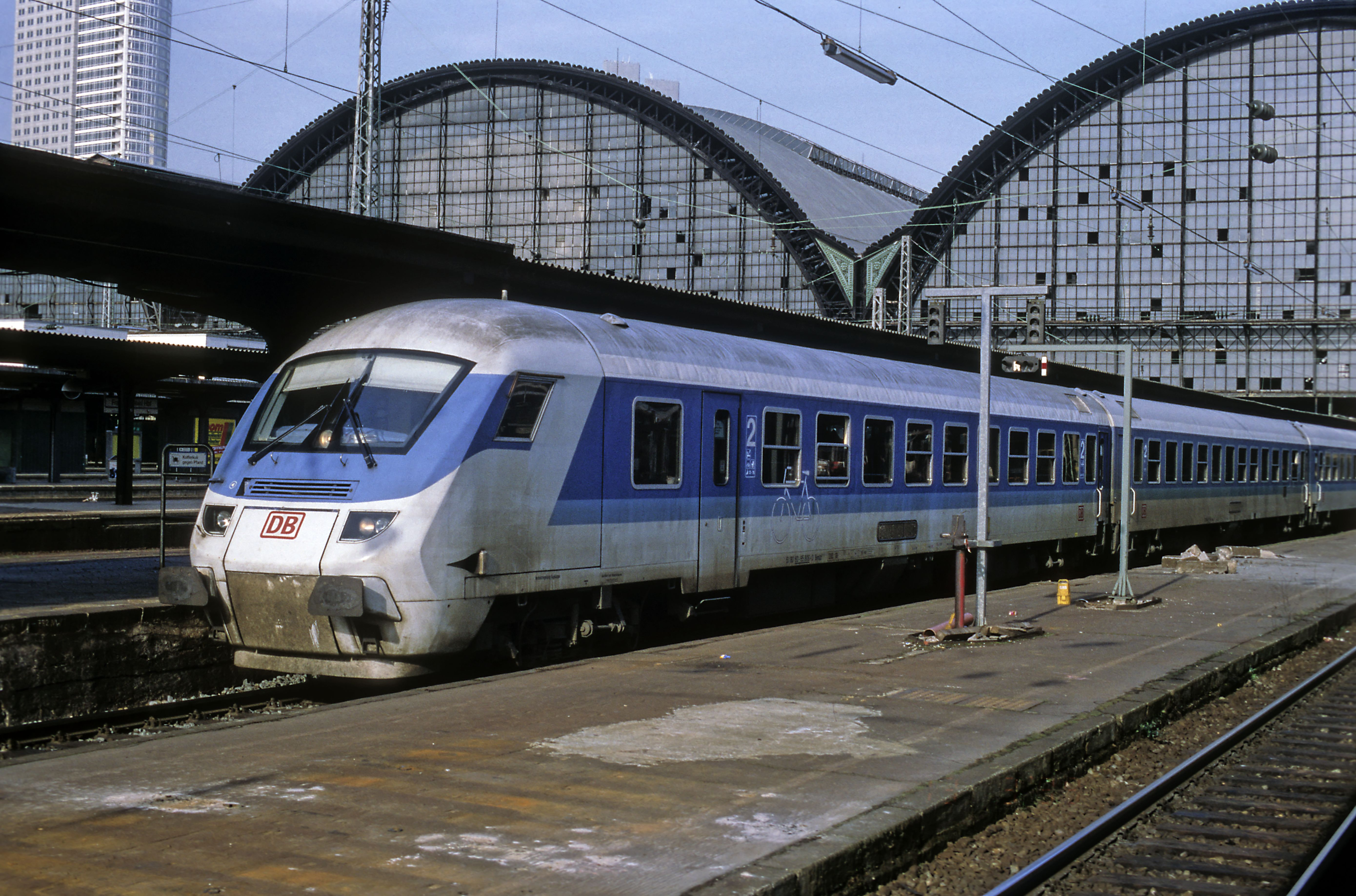
Former German InterRegio (1998)

InterRegio trains were also commonplace in Germany from 1988 to 2003. They travelled and mainly connected regions in Germany. Most of the InterRegio lines have been replaced by Intercity lines; a few were replaced by the newly established Interregio-Express (IRE) type. However, Interregio-Express lines belong technically to the short distance train category, and tend to be shorter. InterRegio trains were very popular as they could be used without supplement.

DB gradually retired the concept in favor of more expensive InterCity (IC) or Intercity Express (ICE) trains with several former IR lines also being split up and downgraded to regional services.

=== Italy ===
The Ferrovie dello Stato Italiane introduced interregional trains (Italian: treni interregionali) in 1993, with express trains and some direct trains classified under this category. The name was abandoned in 2006 and the services subsequently operated as either CityExpress (CExp) or regional trains (R/REG). Since 2010, the former interregional trains received the new category treno regionale veloce (RV/RGV), lit. 'fast regional trains'.

== See also ==
- Train categories in Europe
