= Bad Ragaz railway station =

Railway station in Switzerland

Bad Ragaz
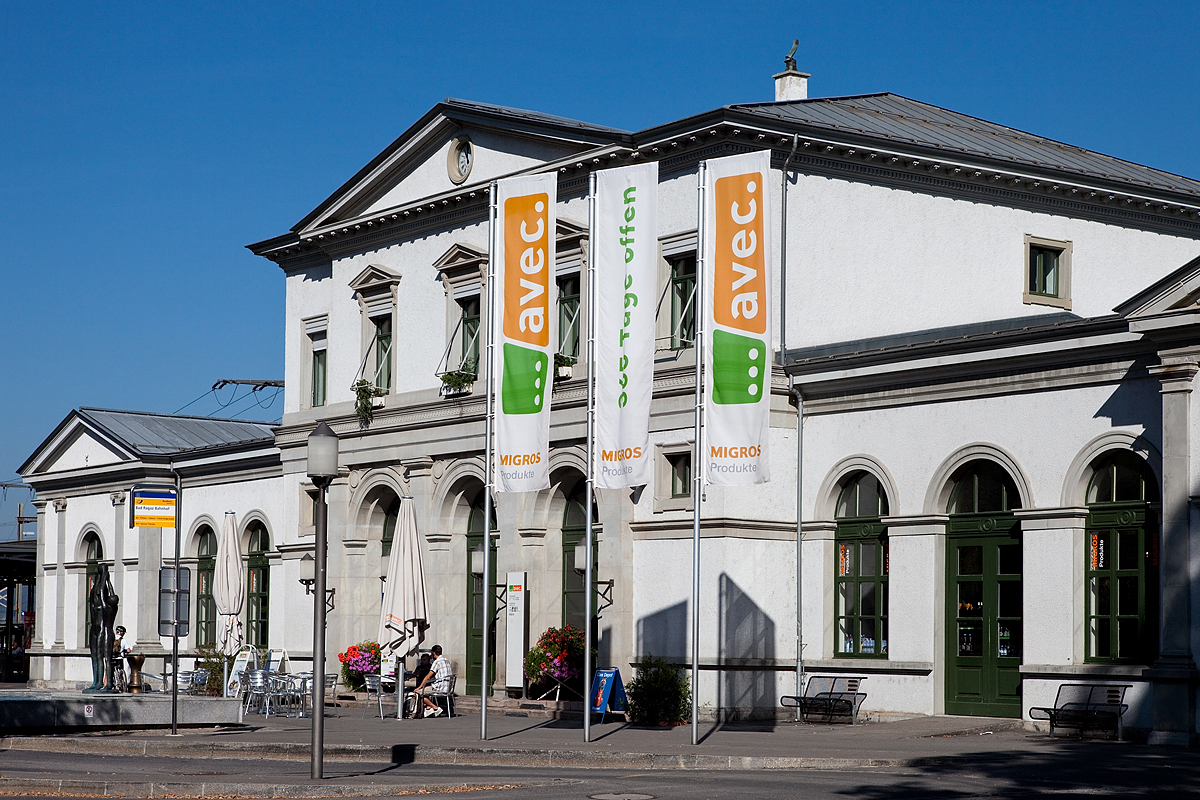
- The station building in 2009

General information
- Location: Bad Ragaz; Switzerland
- Coordinates: 47°00′36″N 9°30′18″E
- Owner: Swiss Federal Railways
- Line: Chur–Rorschach line
- Train operators: Südostbahn; Swiss Federal Railways; THURBO
- Connections: PostBus

Services
Preceding station	Südostbahn	Following station
Sargans towards St. Gallen	IR 13 Alpenrhein-Express	Maienfeld towards Chur
Sargans towards Bern	IR 35 Aare Linth	Maienfeld towards Chur
Preceding station	St. Gallen S-Bahn	Following station
Sargans Terminus	S12	Maienfeld towards Chur
Location
- Location within Switzerland Location within Canton of St. Gallen

Bad Ragaz railway station (German: Bahnhof Bad Ragaz) is a railway station in the municipality of Bad Ragaz, in the Swiss canton of St. Gallen. It is an intermediate stop on the Chur–Rorschach line.

== Services ==
The following services call at Bad Ragaz:

- InterRegio:
  - Hourly service between St. Gallen and Chur.
  - Hourly service between Bern and Chur, via Zürich HB.
- St. Gallen S-Bahn S12: half-hourly service between Sargans and Chur.
