= S12 (St. Gallen S-Bahn) =

Railway in St. Gallen, Switzerland

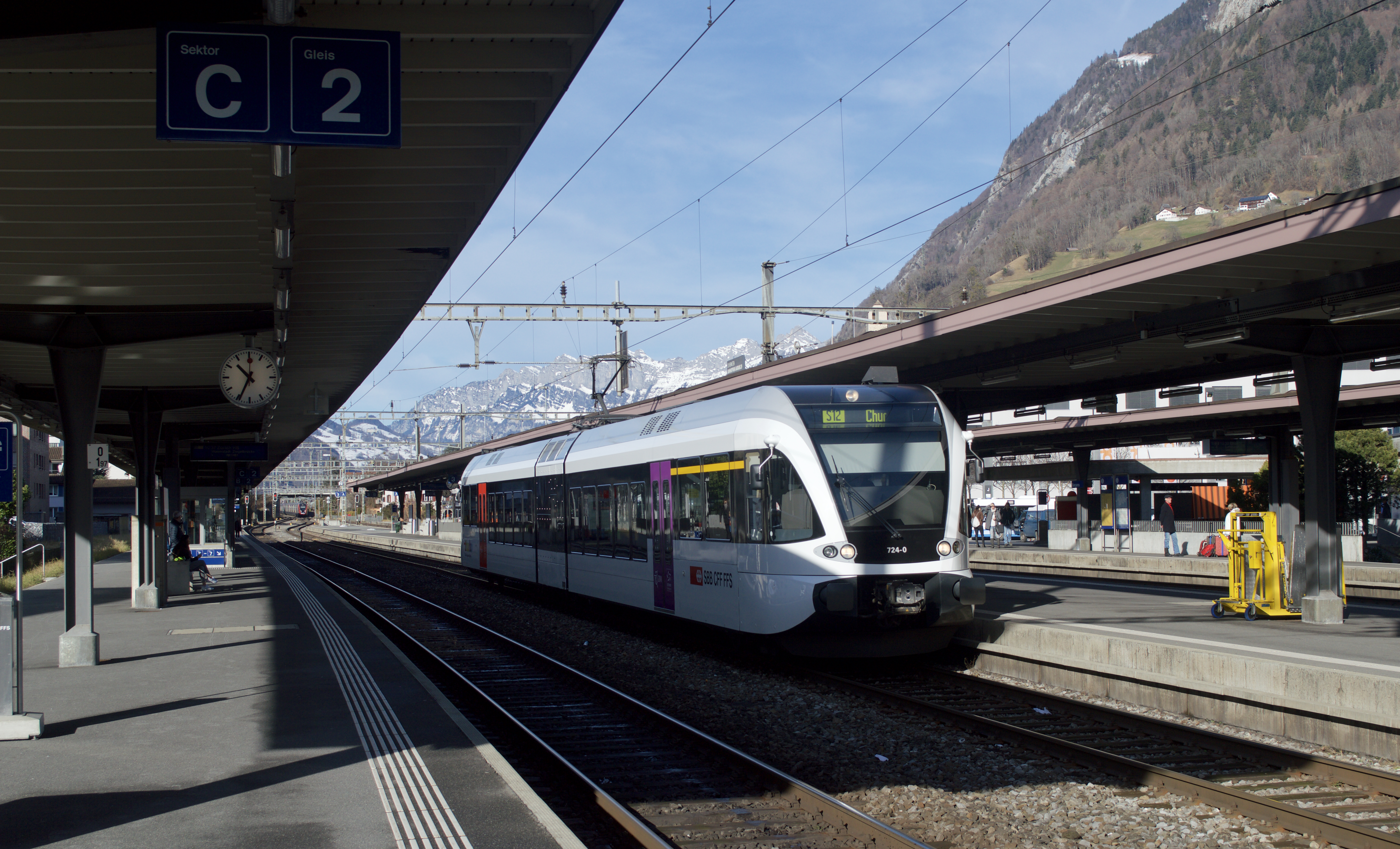
- A Chur-bound S12 at Sargans in 2020

Overview
- First service: 15 December 2013
- Current operator: THURBO

Route
- Termini: Sargans; Chur
- Stops: 3
- Distance travelled: 25.2 kilometres (15.7 mi)
- Average journey time: 20 minutes
- Service frequency: Every 30 minutes
- Line used: Chur–Rorschach line

The S12 is a railway service of the St. Gallen S-Bahn that provides half-hourly service between Sargans and Chur over the southern end of the Chur–Rorschach line. THURBO, a joint venture of Swiss Federal Railways and the canton of Thurgau, operates the service.

== Operations ==
The S12 operates every 30 minutes between Sargans and Chur, using the southern end of the Chur–Rorschach line. In Sargans, an hourly connection is made with the S4, which operates in a circular fashion west over the Ziegelbrücke–Sargans line and north up the Chur–Rorschach line. The S12 is supplemented by various long-distance trains.

== Route ==
S12 Sargans – Chur

- Sargans
- Bad Ragaz
- Maienfeld
- Landquart
- Chur

== History ==
Prior to the December 2013 timetable change, the S12 designation was used for services on the narrow-gauge St. Gallen–Trogen line of Appenzell Railways. That service was renamed S21, while S12 was applied to services running between Sargans and Chur.
