= Brunnen railway station =

Railway station in Switzerland

Brunnen
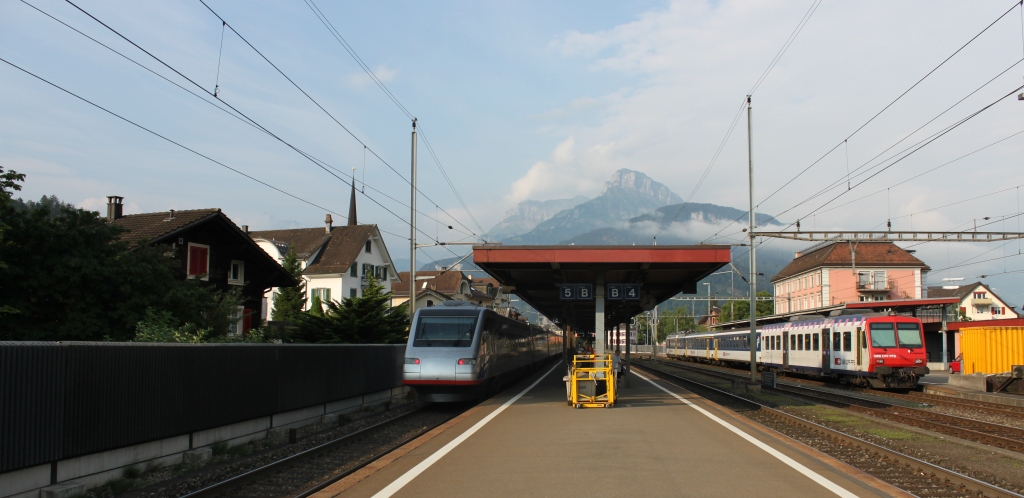
- Brunnen station looking south, with a passing ETR 470 train to the left and a calling S3 train to the right.

General information
- Location: Ingenbohl; Switzerland
- Coordinates: 46°59′57″N 8°36′36″E
- Elevation: 439 m (1,440 ft)
- Owner: Swiss Federal Railways
- Line: Gotthard line
- Distance: 20.5 km (12.7 mi) from Immensee
- Platforms: 2
- Tracks: 3
- Train operators: Südostbahn; Swiss Federal Railways
- Connections: SGV ferries; Auto AG Schwyz buses

Other information
- Fare zone: 670 (Tarifverbund Schwyz)

History
- Opened: 1882

Passengers
- 2018: 3,000 per weekday

Services
Preceding station	Südostbahn	Following station
Schwyz towards Basel SBB	IR 26	Flüelen towards Locarno
Schwyz towards Zürich HB	IR 46	Flüelen towards Locarno
Preceding station	Zug Stadtbahn	Following station
Schwyz towards Baar Lindenpark	S2	Sisikon towards Erstfeld
Preceding station	Lucerne S-Bahn	Following station
Schwyz towards Lucerne	S3	Terminus
Location

Brunnen railway station (German: Bahnhof Brunnen) is a railway station serving the resort of Brunnen, in the Swiss canton of Schwyz and municipality of Ingenbohl. It is located on the Gotthard railway, and is served by long-distance trains as well as by commuter and suburban trains.

== History ==
After some argument between the inhabitants of Brunnen and those of Ingenbohl about the location, the station was opened in 1882, when the Gotthardbahn opened the section from Immensee to Bellinzona. In 1903 the station was rebuilt because the older station had become too small for the amount of traffic. In 2004, the station became part of the networks of the S-Bahn Luzern and Stadtbahn Zug.

== Layout ==
Brunnen has a side platform and an island platform serving tracks numbered 2 and 4–5, respectively.

== Services ==
In the 1960s and '70s, Brunnen hosted international trains to Lecce, in Italy, and Hook of Holland, in the Netherlands.

Today Brunnen is served by an hourly InterRegio trains between Locarno and Arth-Goldau which continue alternately either to Basel SBB or to Zürich HB. The station is also served by line S2 of the Zug Stadtbahn, which operates hourly between Zug, Arth-Goldau and Erstfeld, and is the terminus of line S3 of the Lucerne S-Bahn, which operates hourly to and from Lucerne.

== Goods station ==
Until 2004 there was a Service Center of SBB Cargo to the north of the station. After closings, the buildings were reused by a Kart Racing track for a few years until being demolished. Today a new mixed use development stands in its place.

== See also ==
- Rail transport in Switzerland
