= Maienfeld railway station =

Railway station in Switzerland

Maienfeld
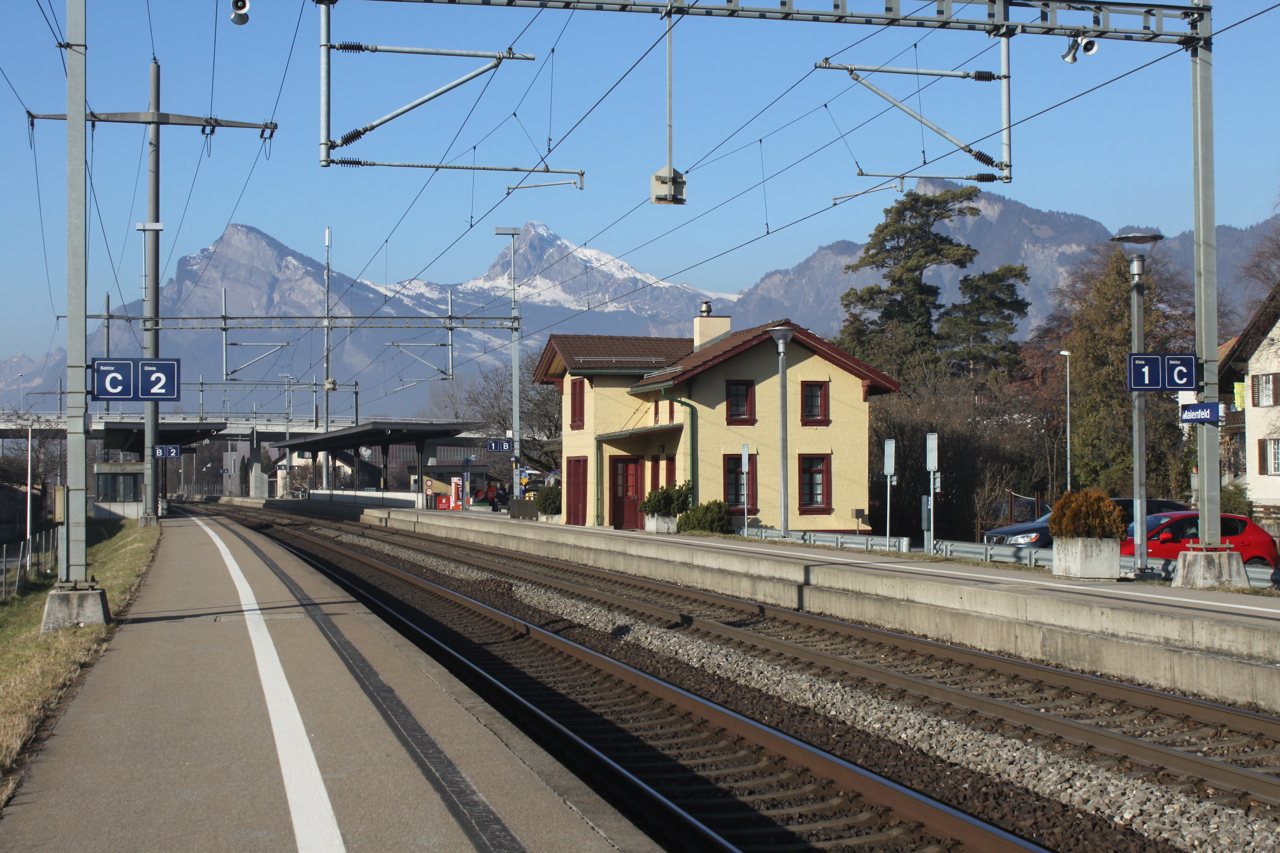
- The station building in 2013

General information
- Location: Maienfeld; Switzerland
- Coordinates: 47°00′14″N 9°31′44″E
- Owner: Swiss Federal Railways
- Line: Chur–Rorschach line
- Train operators: Thurbo

Services
Preceding station	St. Gallen S-Bahn	Following station
Bad Ragaz towards Sargans	S12	Landquart towards Chur
Preceding station	Südostbahn	Following station
Bad Ragaz towards St. Gallen	IR 13 Alpenrhein-Express	Landquart towards Chur
Bad Ragaz towards Bern	IR 35 Aare Linth	Landquart towards Chur
Location
- Location within Switzerland Location within Canton of Grisons

Maienfeld railway station (German: Bahnhof Maienfeld) is a railway station in the municipality of Maienfeld, in the Swiss canton of Grisons. It is an intermediate stop on the Chur–Rorschach line.

== Services ==
Maienfeld is served by the S12 of the St. Gallen S-Bahn and IR13 and IR35:

- S12: half-hourly service between Sargans and Chur.
- : hourly service between St. Gallen and Chur.
- : hourly service between Bern and Chur.
