= Seewen, Schwyz =

Seewen
- Village
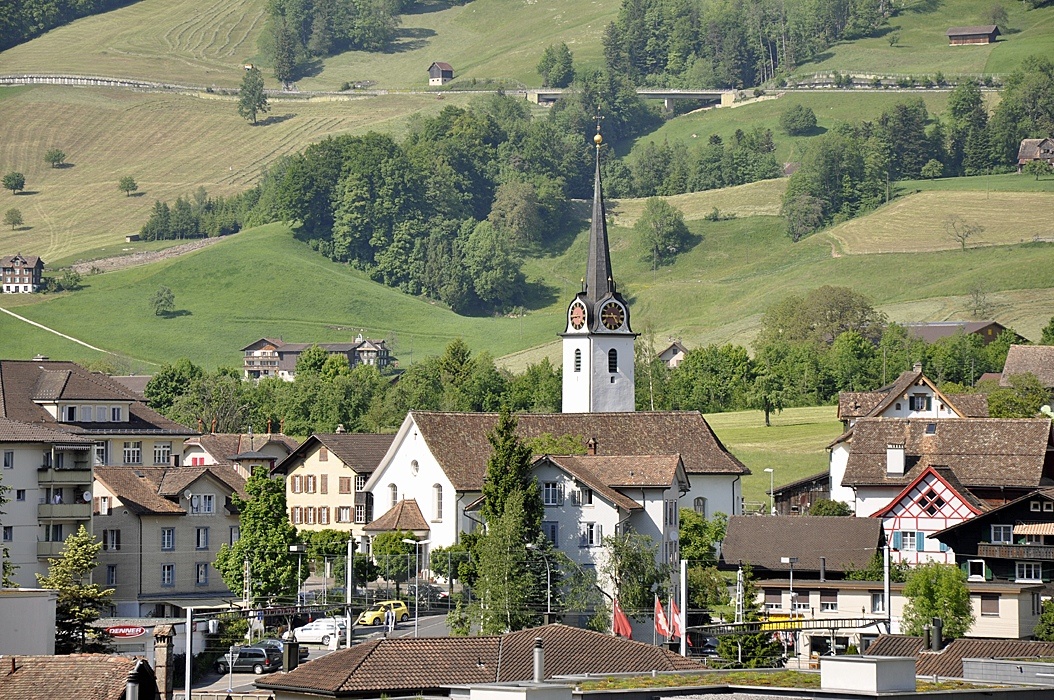

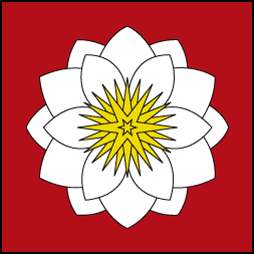
- Flag
- Interactive map of Seewen
- Coordinates: 47°01′45″N 8°37′48″E
- Country: Switzerland
- Canton: Schwyz
- Municipality: Schwyz

Seewen is a village in the municipality of Schwyz, itself in the canton of Schwyz in Switzerland. It lies some 2 km (1.2 mi) to the west of the town centre of Schwyz, and near the shore of Lake Lauerz. The outfall stream of the lake, the Seeweren, passes through the village on its way to join the Muota river.

Aerial view from 500 m by Walter Mittelholzer (1923)

Schwyz railway station, on the Gotthard railway, is located in Seewen. The A4 motorway passes just to the west of the village, and an adjacent motorway junction provides access to it.
