= Auto AG Schwyz =

Swiss bus company

Coordinates: 47.00971987°N 8.63643342°E

Present logo of Auto AG Schwyz

Former logo of Auto AG Schwyz

Auto AG Schwyz (AAGS) is a company based in Schwyz, Switzerland which provides bus services to the Canton of Schwyz. The company operates commercial daytime services throughout the Canton, and its vehicles venture into the neighbouring Canton of Lucerne during the night when it operates the N10 service on the Nachstern network, in conjunction with Verkehrsbetriebe Luzern. The company currently runs 28 buses.

== Livery ==
Auto AG Schwyz vehicles are painted in a livery of red and white.

== See also ==
- Transport in Switzerland
- List of bus operating companies in Switzerland
