= Airolo railway station =

Railway station in Switzerland

Airolo
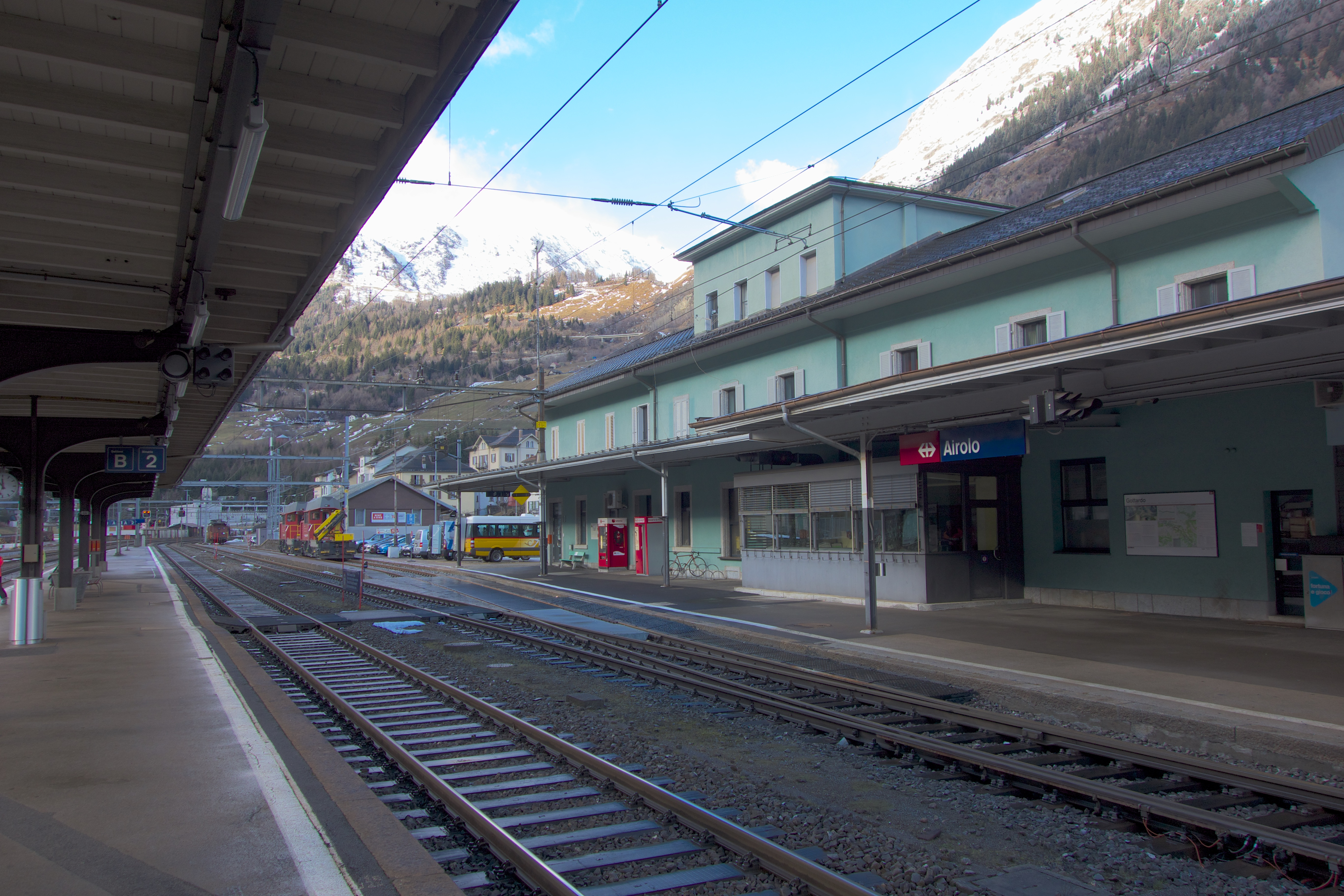
- Airolo station building and platforms

General information
- Location: Viale Stazione; Airolo; Switzerland
- Coordinates: 46°31′39″N 8°36′31″E
- Elevation: 1,142 m (3,747 ft)
- Owner: Swiss Federal Railways
- Line: Gotthard line
- Distance: 86.2 km (53.6 mi) from Immensee
- Train operators: Südostbahn; Treni Regionali Ticino Lombardia
- Connections: Autopostale bus lines

Other information
- Fare zone: 244 (arcobaleno)

Passengers
- 2018: 370 per weekday

Services
Preceding station	Südostbahn	Following station
Göschenen towards Basel SBB	IR 26	Ambrì-Piotta towards Locarno
Göschenen towards Zürich HB	IR 46	Ambrì-Piotta towards Locarno
Preceding station	TiLo	Following station
Terminus	S10 Limited service	Ambrì-Piotta towards Como San Giovanni
Terminus	S50 Limited service	Ambrì-Piotta towards Malpensa Aeroporto Terminal 2
Location

Airolo railway station (Italian: Stazione di Airolo) is a railway station in the Swiss canton of Ticino and municipality of Airolo. The station is on the original line of the Swiss Federal Railways Gotthard railway, at the southern entrance to the Gotthard Tunnel. Most trains on the Gotthard route now use the Gotthard Base Tunnel and do not pass through Airolo station.

The station has three platform tracks, served by a side platform and an island platform, connected by a pedestrian subway. The station building, on the side platform, includes a kiosk and a ticket office, but is largely given over to a manufacturer of local yogurts. Just outside the station entrance is a memorial to the lives lost during the construction of the Gotthard Tunnel.

== Services ==
As of the December 2021 timetable change, the following services stop at Airolo:

- InterRegio: hourly service between Locarno and Arth-Goldau; trains continue to Basel SBB or Zürich Hauptbahnhof.
- S10 / S50: one train per day to Chiasso, Como San Giovanni, or Malpensa Aeroporto Terminal 1.
- Gotthard Panorama Express: daily tourist oriented service between Lugano and Arth-Goldau, with connecting boat service on Lake Lucerne to Lucerne.

Bus services operated by Autopostale terminate in front of the station, and include an hourly service to Bellinzona that parallels the railway, together with a less frequent route across the Novena Pass to Oberwald.

== Gallery ==
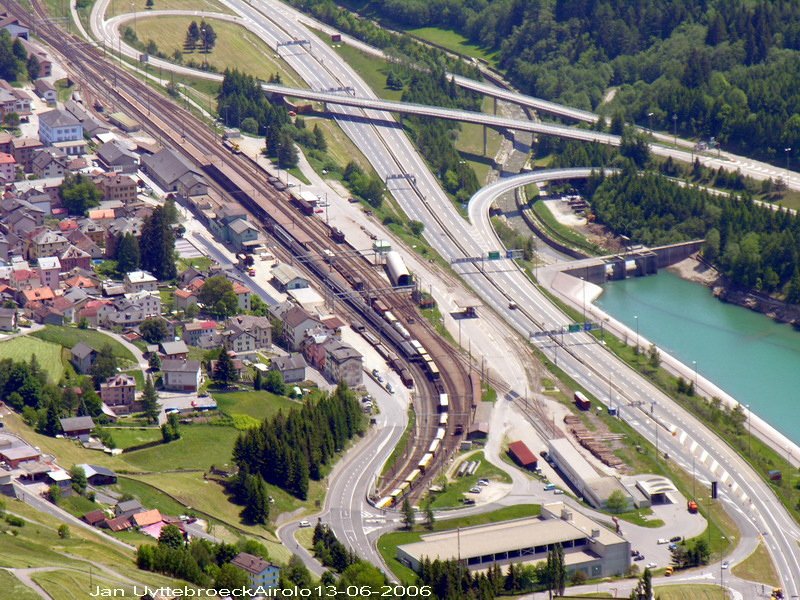
Aerial view of station and tunnel entrance

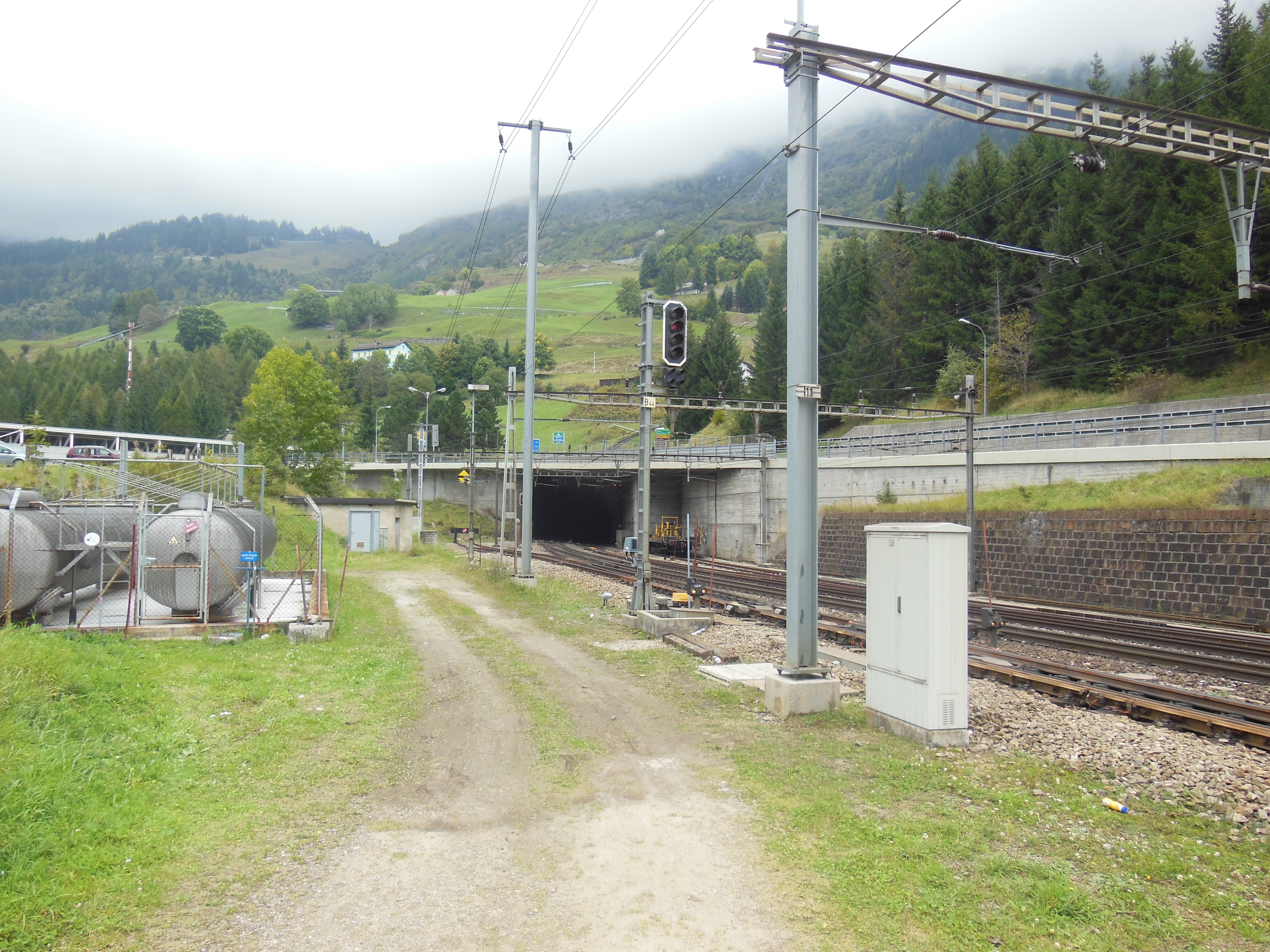
Entrance to the Gotthard tunnel

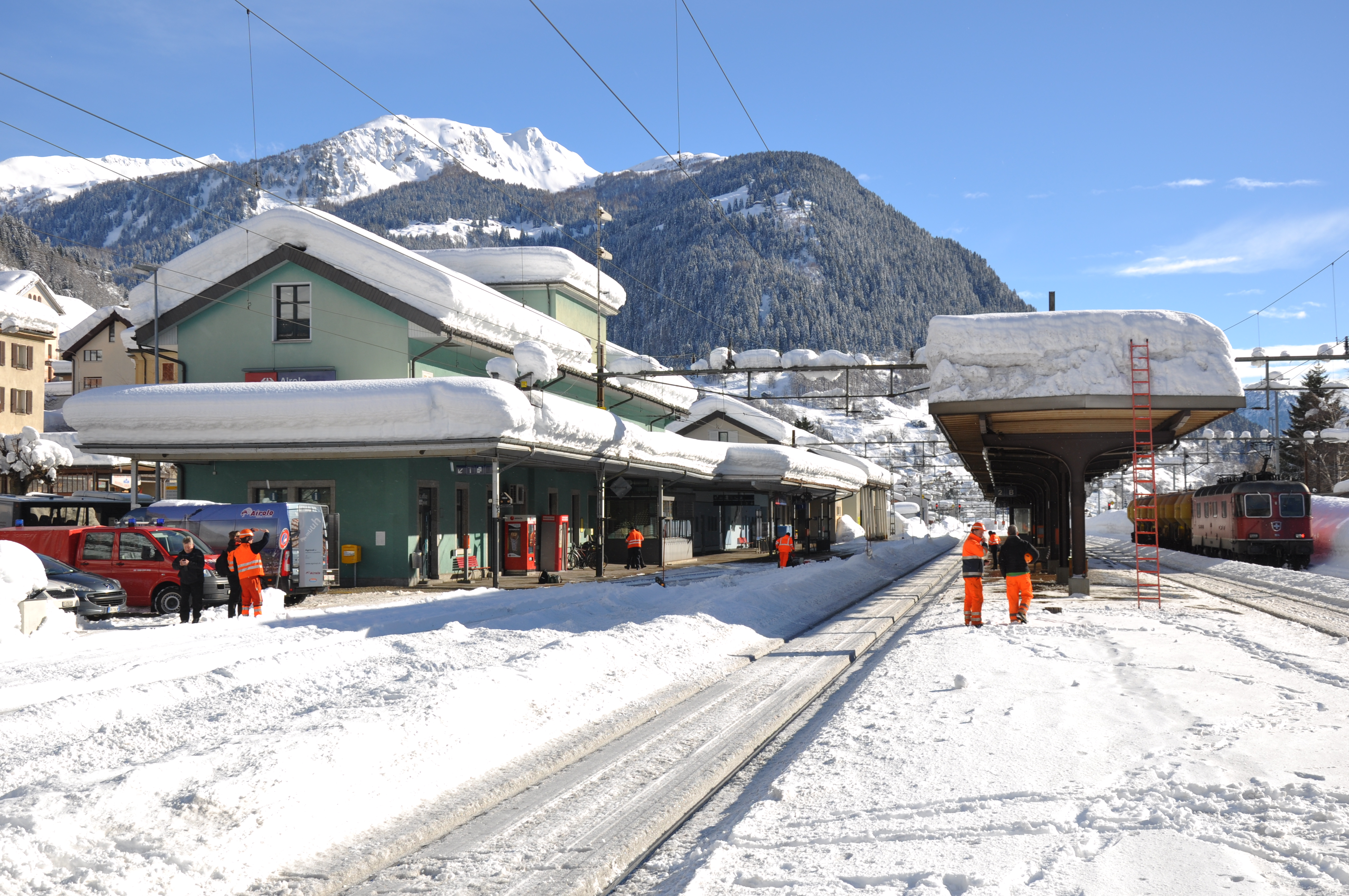
The station in the snow

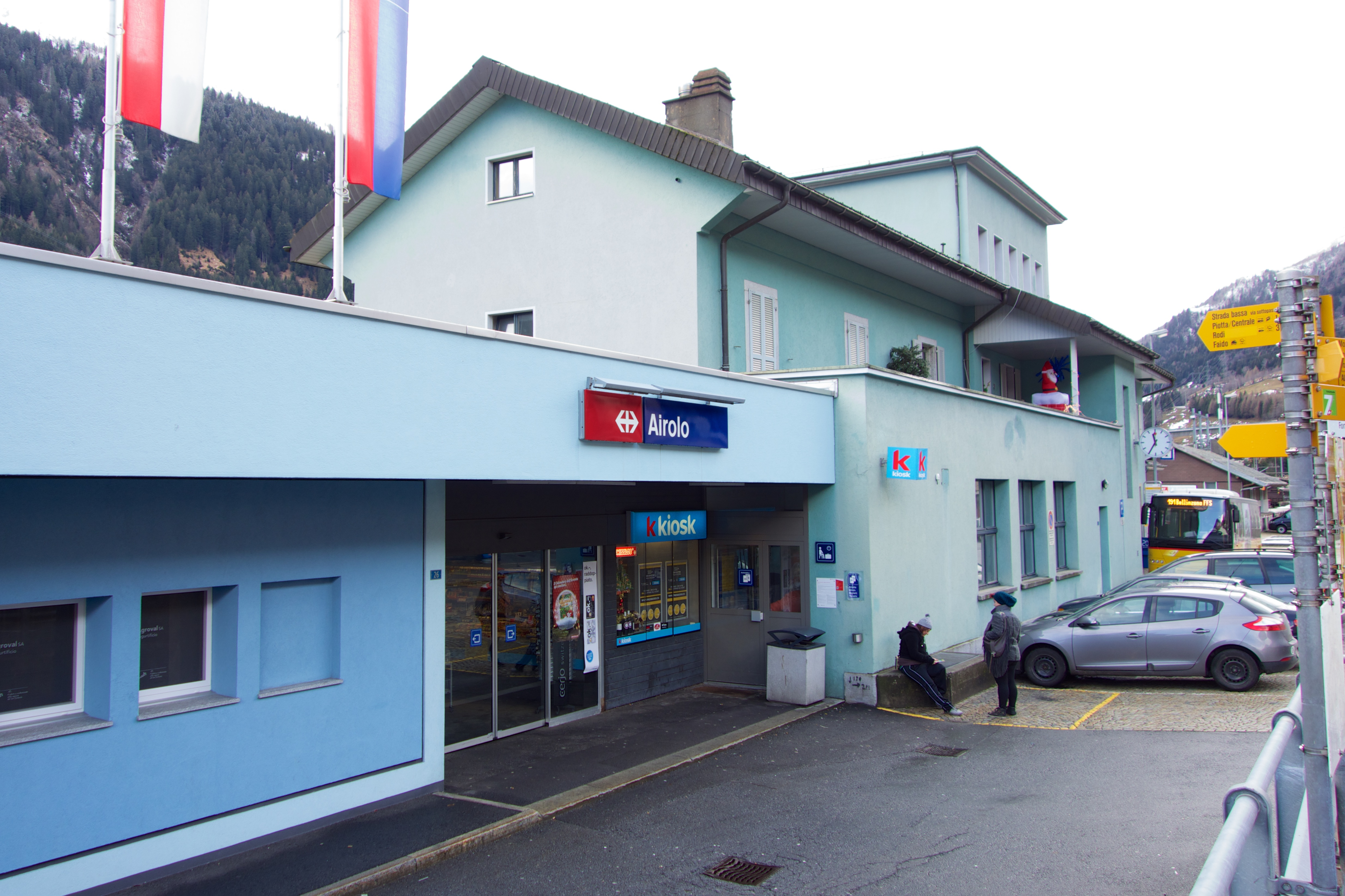
Entrance of station building

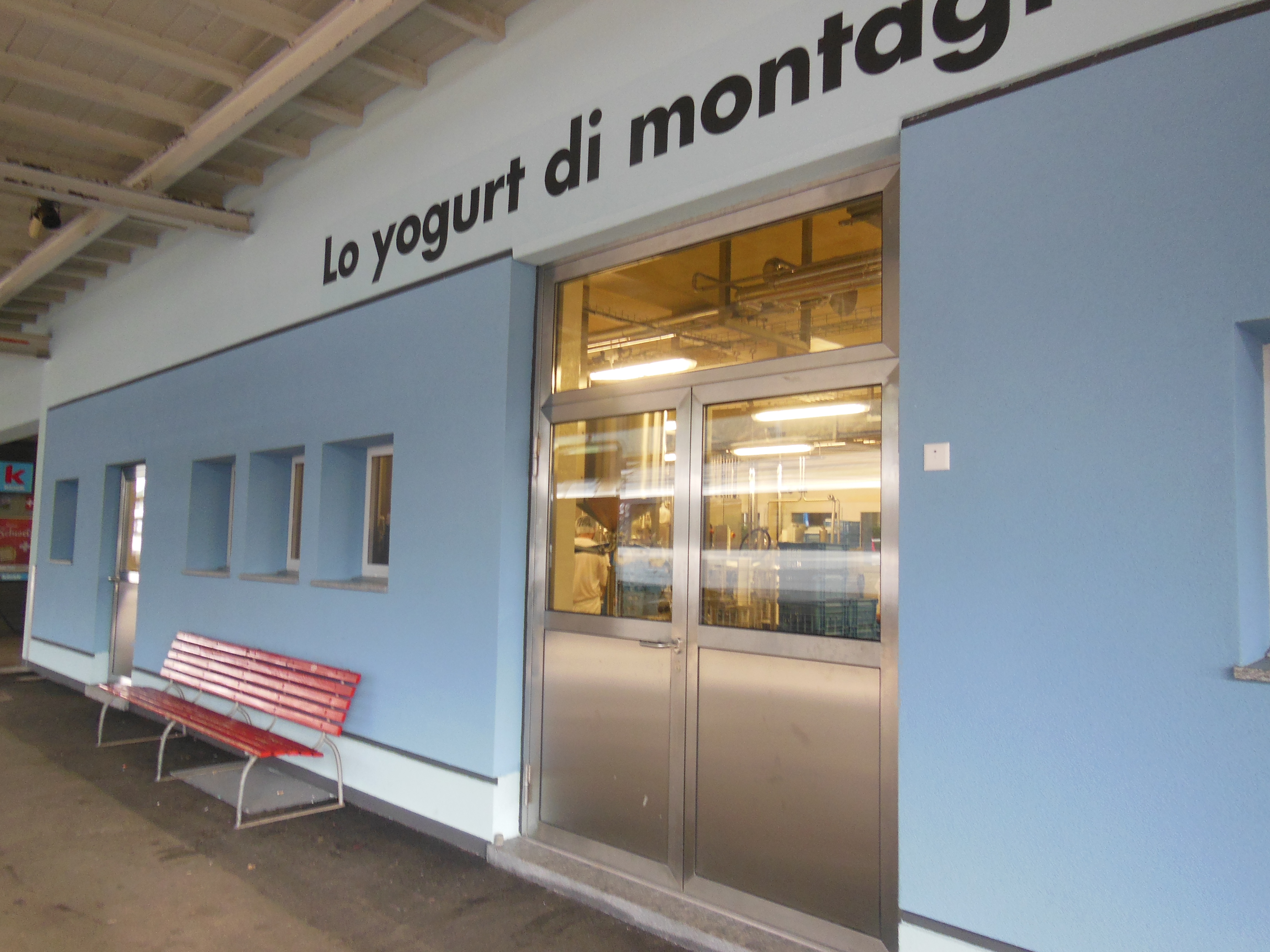
The yoghurt factory on the platform
