= Weesen, Switzerland =

Weesen
- Municipality
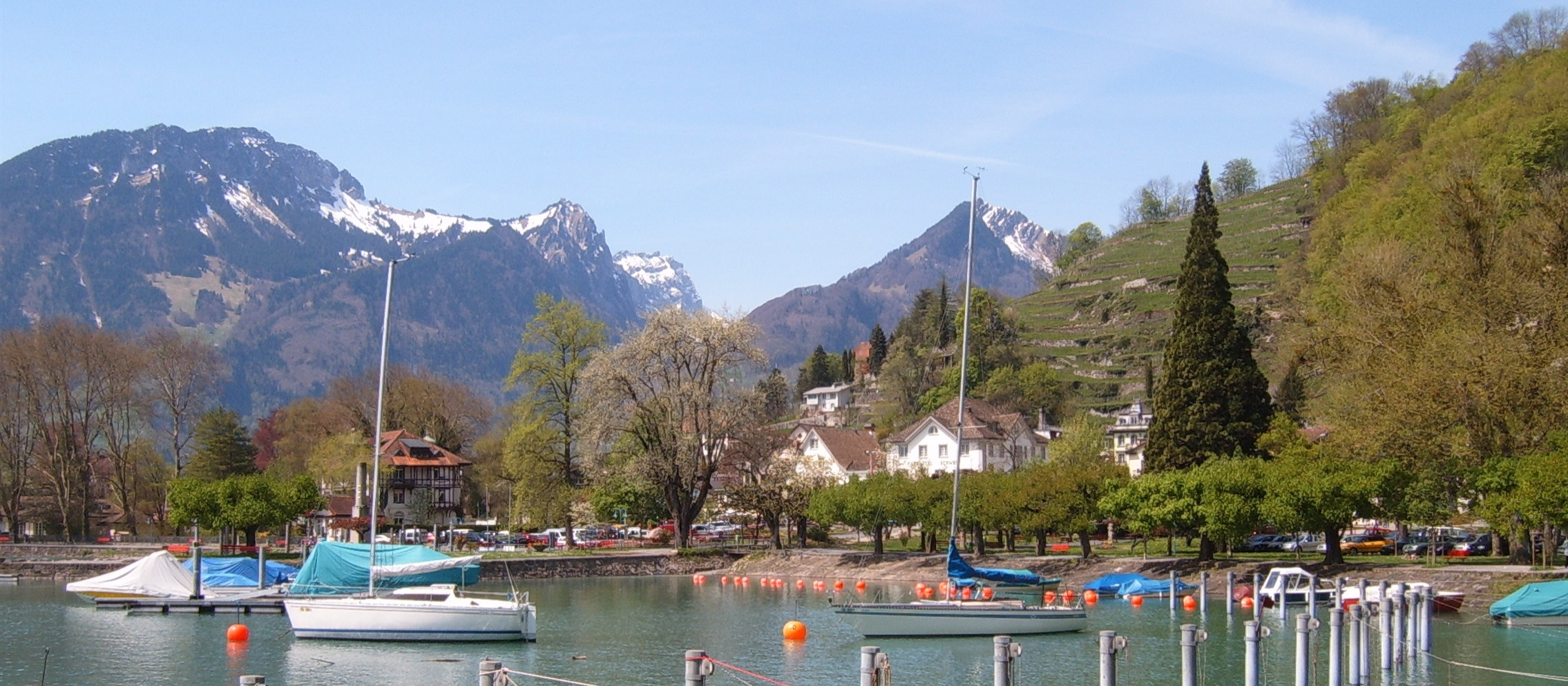

- Flag Coat of arms
- Location of Weesen
- Location within Switzerland Location within Canton of St. Gallen
- Coordinates: 47°8′N 9°6′E
- Country: Switzerland
- Canton: St. Gallen
- District: See-Gaster

Government
  - Mayor: Marcel Benz

Area
  - Total: 5.39 km^{2} (2.08 sq mi)
- Elevation: 423 m (1,388 ft)

Population (December 2020)
  - Total: 1,753
  - Density: 325/km^{2} (842/sq mi)
- Time zone: UTC+01:00 (CET)
  - Summer (DST): UTC+02:00 (CEST)
- Postal code: 8872
- SFOS number: 3316
- ISO 3166 code: CH-SG
- Surrounded by: Amden, Filzbach (GL), Mollis (GL), Niederurnen (GL), Schänis
- Website: www.weesen.ch

Weesen is a village in See-Gaster in the canton of St. Gallen, Switzerland, located on Lake Walen (Walensee) near the outflow of the Linth Canal.

== Geography ==
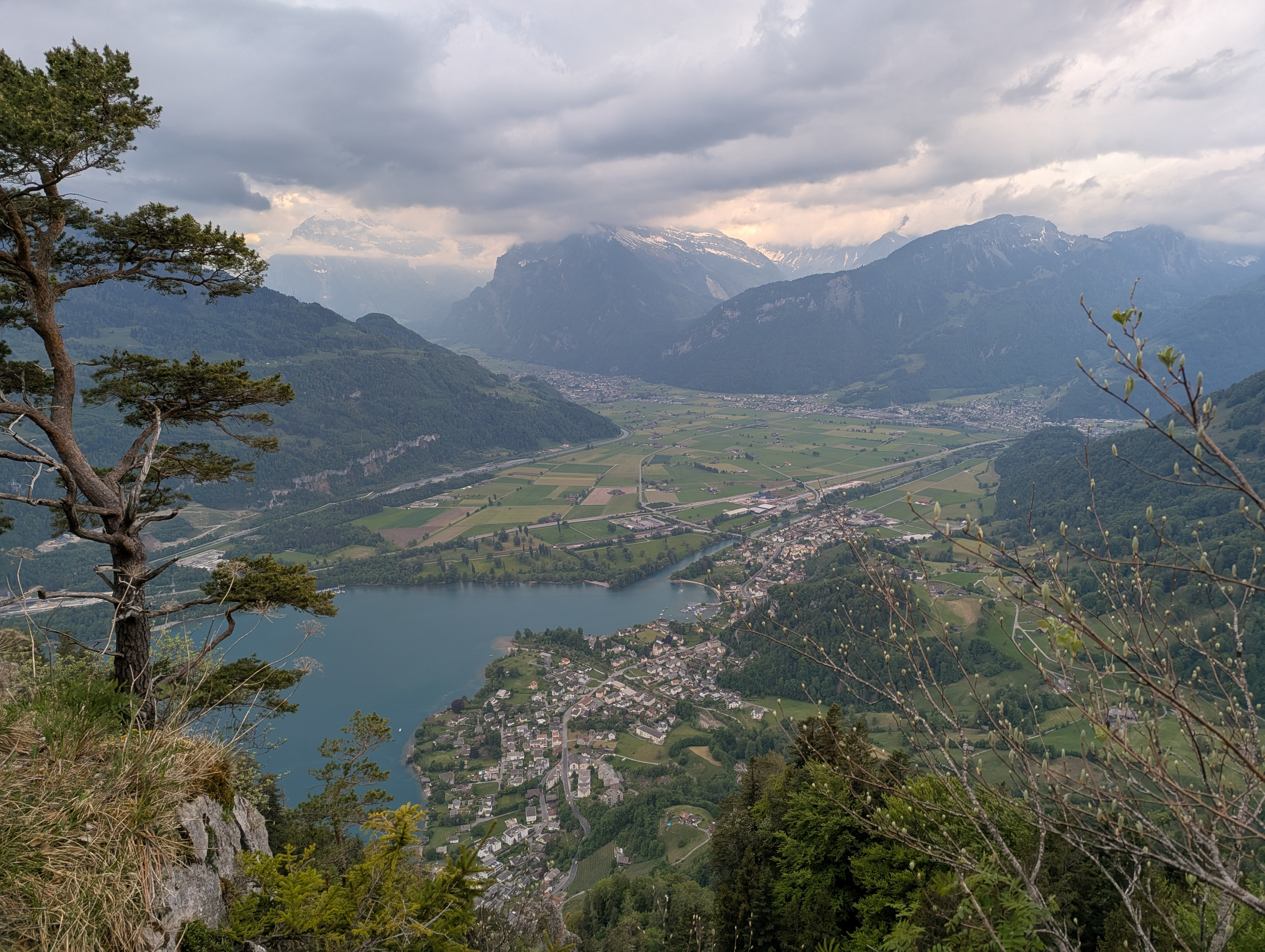
View of Weesen (on the lake shore) and the upper Linth valley

Aerial view from 100 m by Walter Mittelholzer (1919)

Weesen has an area, as of 2006, of 5.4 km^{2} (2.1 sq mi). Of this area, 36.3% is used for agricultural purposes, while 51.9% is forested. Of the rest of the land, 9.1% is settled (buildings or roads) and the remainder (2.8%) is non-productive (rivers or lakes).

The Flybach, a small creek, runs through Weesen. Until the correction of the river Linth (1807–1823), Weesen was located near the river Maag, which was the outflow of Lake Walen (Walensee) and which merged with the Linth further west.

Nearby mountains belong to the Appenzell Alps to the north (Federispitz, Mattstock, Speer), the Glarus Alps (Mürtschenstock) to the south, and the Schwyz Alps (Chöpfenberg, Planggenstock) to the west.

== Coat of arms ==
The blazon of the municipal coat of arms is Argent a Bendlet Gules between two Lions counterpassant of the same.

== Demographics ==
Weesen has a population (as of 31 December 2020) of 1,753. As of 2007, about 11.1% of the population was made up of foreign nationals. Of the foreign population, (as of 2000), 31 are from Germany, 12 are from Italy, 77 are from ex-Yugoslavia, 18 are from Austria, 3 are from Turkey, and 44 are from another country. Over the last 10 years the population has grown at a rate of 10.3%. Most of the population (as of 2000) speaks German (92.5%), with Serbo-Croatian being second most common (1.8%) and Albanian being third (1.4%). Of the Swiss national languages (as of 2000), 1,315 speak German, 6 people speak French, 17 people speak Italian, and 1 person speaks Romansh.

The age distribution, as of 2000, in Weesen is; 167 children or 11.7% of the population are between 0 and 9 years old and 134 teenagers or 9.4% are between 10 and 19. Of the adult population, 161 people or 11.3% of the population are between 20 and 29 years old. 233 people or 16.4% are between 30 and 39, 185 people or 13.0% are between 40 and 49, and 188 people or 13.2% are between 50 and 59. The senior population distribution is 146 people or 10.3% of the population are between 60 and 69 years old, 142 people or 10.0% are between 70 and 79, there are 43 people or 3.0% who are between 80 and 89, and there are 23 people or 1.6% who are between 90 and 99.

In 2000 there were 216 persons (or 15.2% of the population) who were living alone in a private dwelling. There were 360 (or 25.3%) persons who were part of a couple (married or otherwise committed) without children, and 640 (or 45.0%) who were part of a couple with children. There were 66 (or 4.6%) people who lived in single parent home, while there are 18 persons who were adult children living with one or both parents, 2 persons who lived in a household made up of relatives, 12 who lived household made up of unrelated persons, and 108 who are either institutionalized or live in another type of collective housing.

In the 2007 federal election the most popular party was the SVP which received 36.4% of the vote. The next three most popular parties were the CVP (21.1%), the FDP (15.5%) and the SP (12.2%).

The entire Swiss population is generally well educated. In Weesen about 71.6% of the population (between age 25–64) have completed either non-mandatory upper secondary education or additional higher education (either University or a Fachhochschule). Out of the total population in Weesen, as of 2000, the highest education level completed by 277 people (19.5% of the population) was Primary, while 525 (36.9%) have completed their secondary education, 216 (15.2%) have attended a Tertiary school, and 41 (2.9%) are not in school. The remainder did not answer this question.

== Heritage sites ==
The late-Roman Era castle and medieval ruins at Altweesen are listed as Swiss heritage sites of national significance.

On 28 August 1232 a document confirms an exchange of goods between members of the noble families of Kyburg and Rapperswil in the villages of Oberwesin and Niderwesin that were in the possession of Kyburg to 1264 respectively of Rapperwil to 1283, the nucleus of the monastic community "in den Wyden", a community of lay women or Beguines, which Count Rudolf IV von Rapperswil donated certain duties and lands to form the Dominikanerinnenkloster Maria Zuflucht in 1259. The Dominican nunnery is listed in the Swiss inventory of cultural property of national and regional significance as a Class B object of regional importance.

== Transport ==
The municipality is located on the A3 motorway.

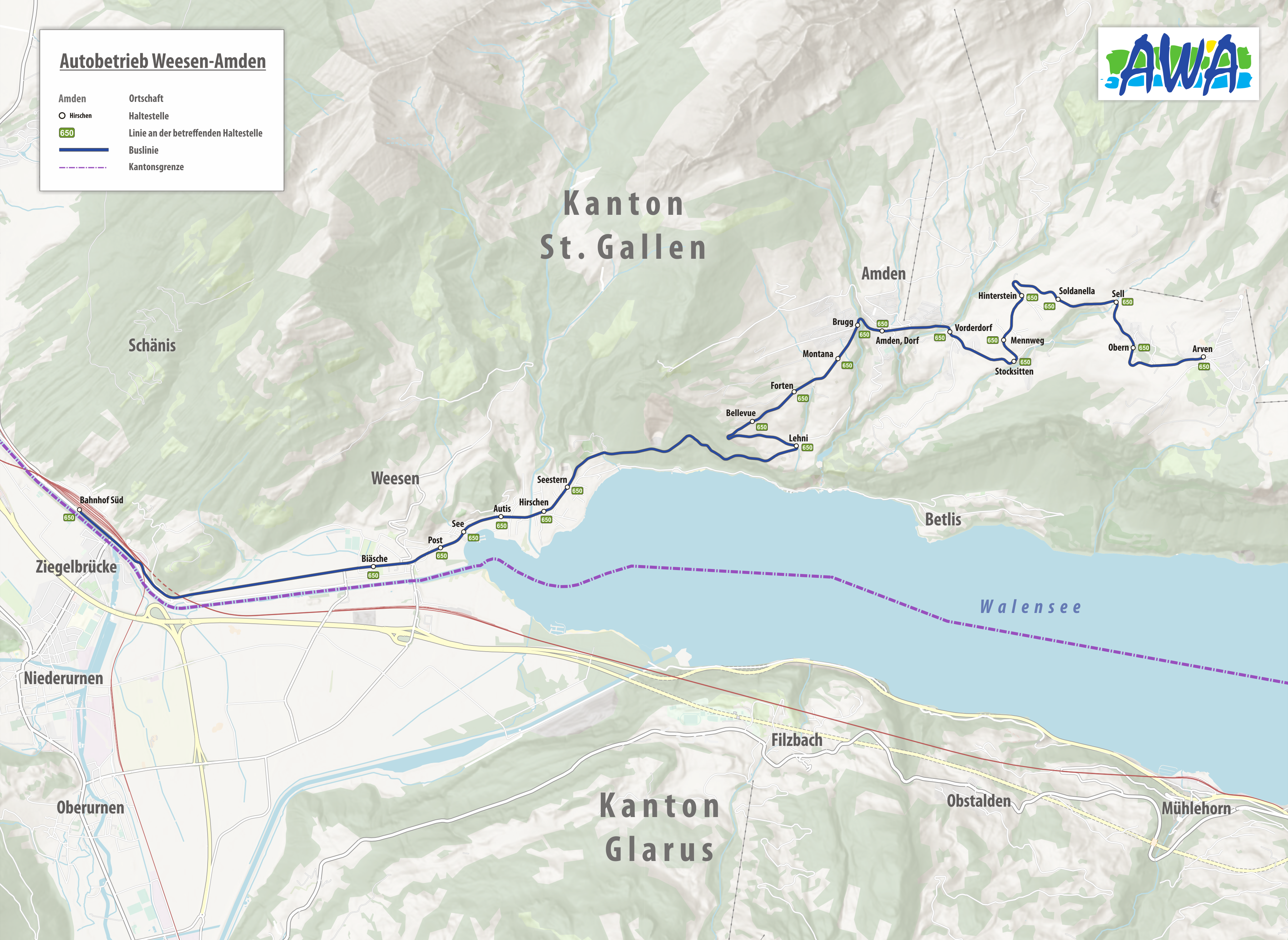
Autobetrieb Weesen-Amden bus route Ziegelbrücke–Weesen–Amden

In the past, Weesen had railway stations at two different locations, of which the first one has been dismantled in 1969. The second Weesen railway station, located south of the Linth canal in the canton of Glarus, has been disused since the end of 2013 (but was briefly reopened during the ESAF 2025). A bus route of Autobetrieb Weesen-Amden (AWA) links Weesen with Ziegelbrücke railway station and Amden. Ziegelbrücke station is served by long-distance InterRegio trains and regional trains of the St. Gallen S-Bahn and Zurich S-Bahn.

There is a landing stage served by boat cruises of Schiffsbetrieb Walensee to other settlements on Lake Walen.

== Economy ==
As of 2007, Weesen had an unemployment rate of 1.41%. As of 2005, there were 34 people employed in the primary economic sector and about 15 businesses involved in this sector. 55 people are employed in the secondary sector and there are 11 businesses in this sector. 311 people are employed in the tertiary sector, with 48 businesses in this sector.

As of October 2009 the average unemployment rate was 3.5%. There were 75 businesses in the municipality of which 10 were involved in the secondary sector of the economy while 51 were involved in the third.

As of 2000 there were 252 residents who worked in the municipality, while 445 residents worked outside Weesen and 223 people commuted into the municipality for work.

== Religion ==
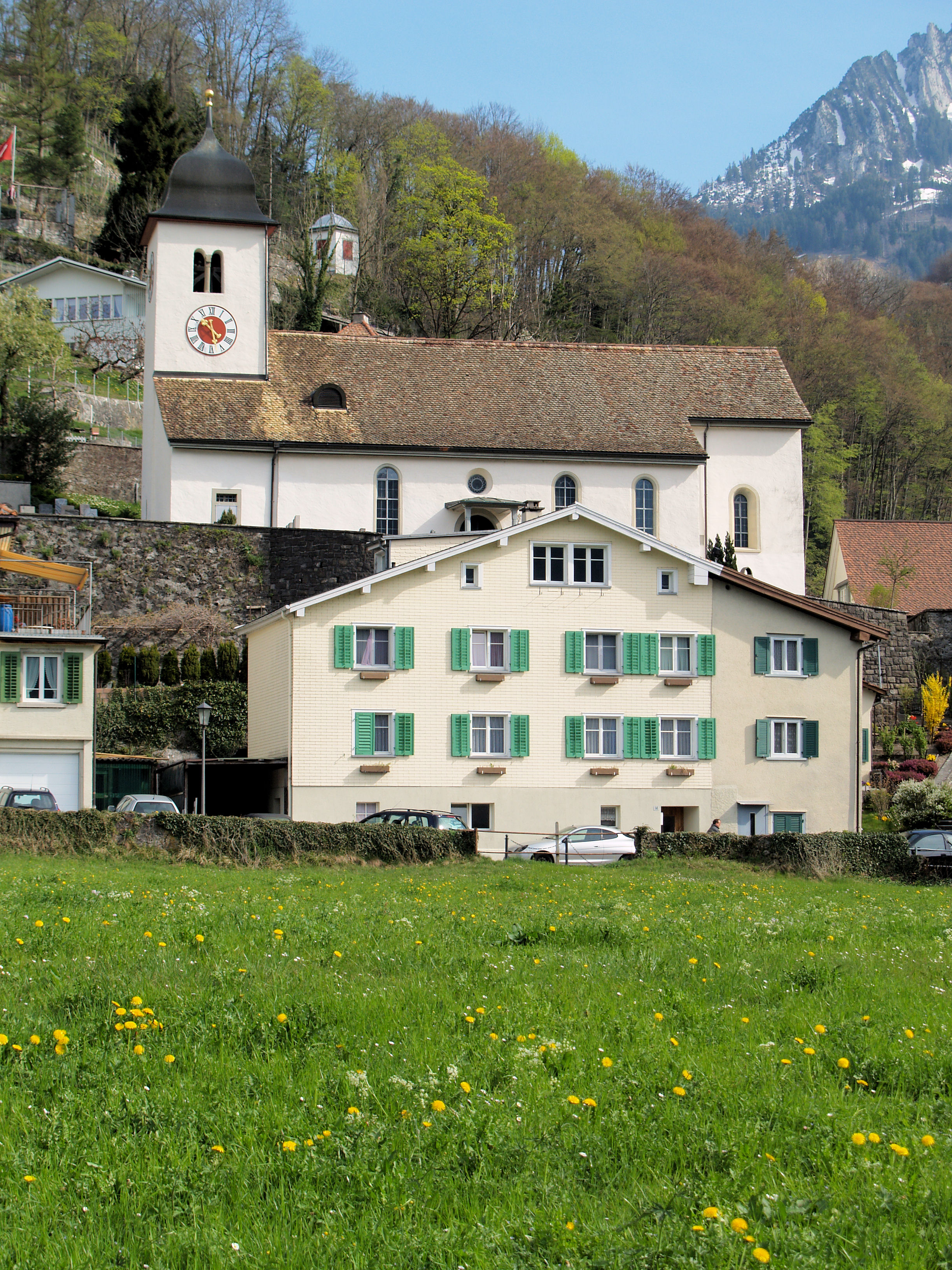
Holy Cross Church in Weesen

From the 2000 census, 728 or 51.2% are Roman Catholic, while 416 or 29.3% belonged to the Swiss Reformed Church. Of the rest of the population, there are 35 individuals (or about 2.46% of the population) who belong to the Orthodox Church, and there are 14 individuals (or about 0.98% of the population) who belong to another Christian church. There are 2 individuals (or about 0.14% of the population) who are Jewish, and 44 (or about 3.09% of the population) who are Islamic. There are 2 individuals (or about 0.14% of the population) who belong to another church (not listed on the census), 106 (or about 7.45% of the population) belong to no church, are agnostic or atheist, and 75 individuals (or about 5.27% of the population) did not answer the question.

== Weather ==
Weesen has an average of 147.2 days of rain or snow per year and on average receives 1,694 mm (66.7 in) of precipitation. The wettest month is August during which time Weesen receives an average of 200 mm (7.9 in) of rain or snow. During this month there is precipitation for an average of 14.2 days. The month with the most days of precipitation is June, with an average of 15, but with only 194 mm (7.6 in) of rain or snow. The driest month of the year is January with an average of 104 mm (4.1 in) of precipitation over 14.2 days.
