= Quinten, Switzerland =

Quinten
- Municipality
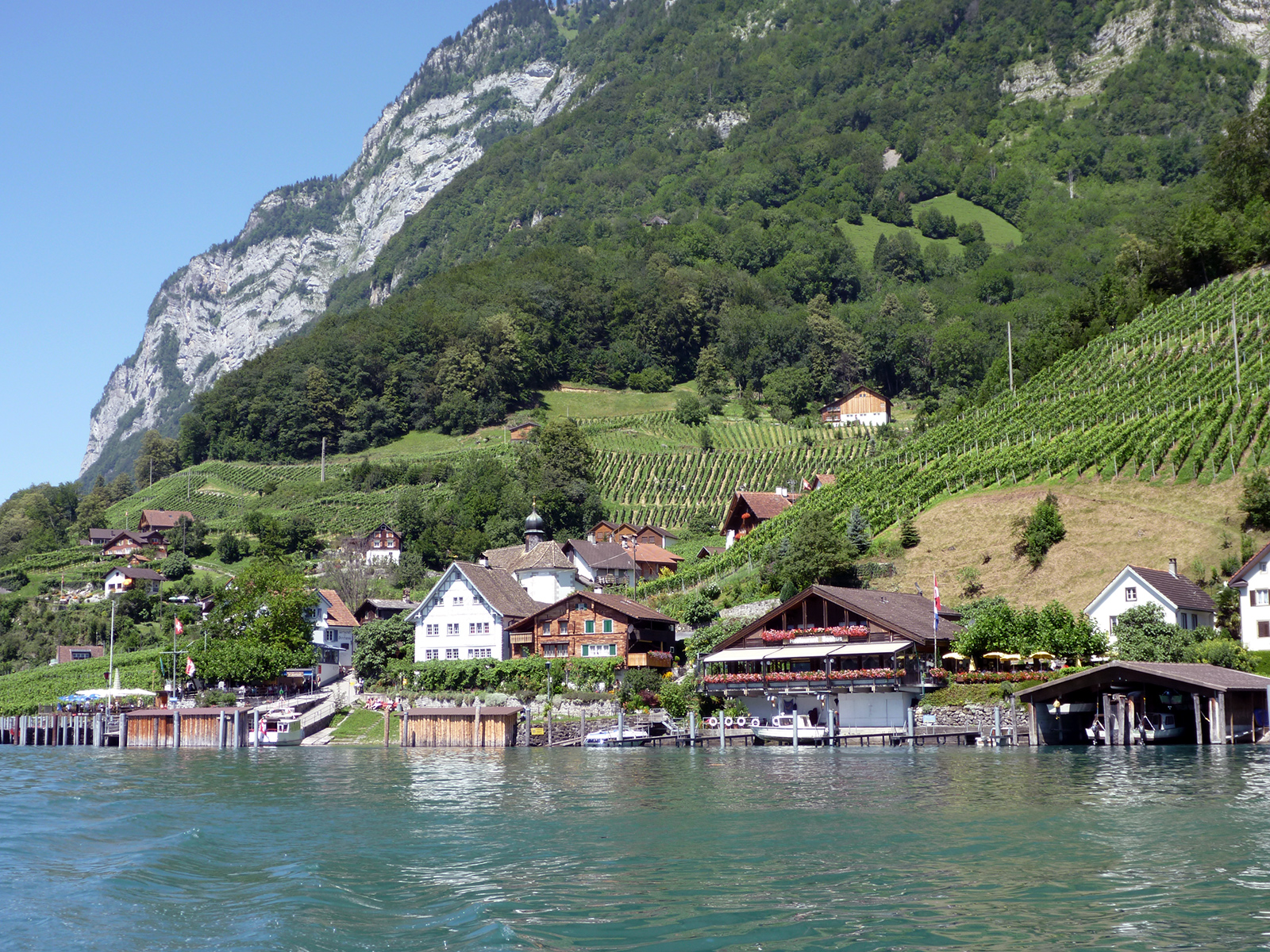

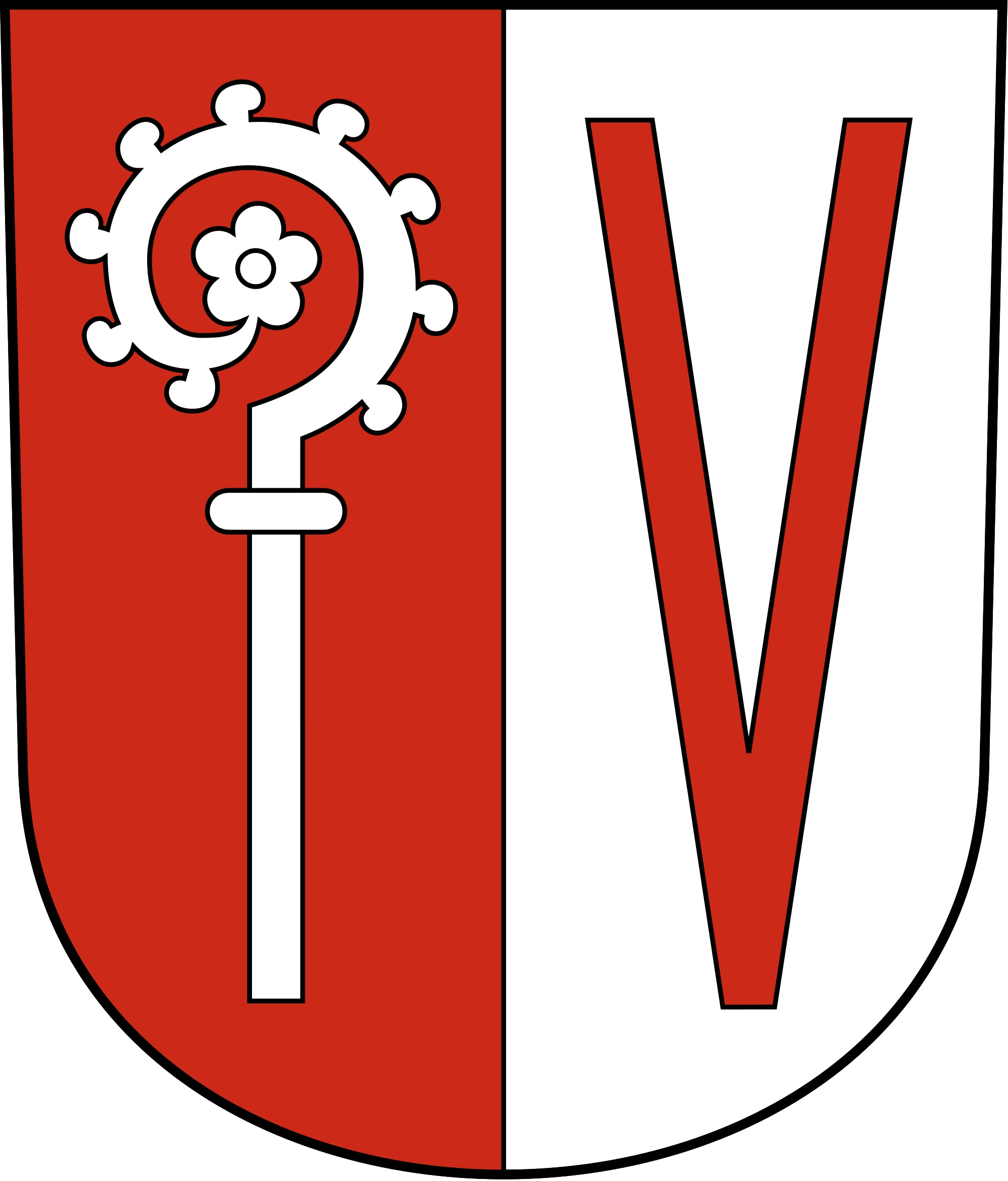
- Coat of arms
- Location of Quinten
- Location within Switzerland Location within Canton of St. Gallen
- Country: Switzerland
- Canton: St. Gallen
- District: Sarganserland
- Elevation: 425 m (1,394 ft)

Population (2008)
  - Total: 41
- Time zone: UTC+01:00 (CET)
  - Summer (DST): UTC+02:00 (CEST)
- Postal code: 8878
- SFOS number: n/a
- ISO 3166 code: CH-SG
- Website: Official website

Quinten is a hamlet situated on the north shore of the Walensee (Lake Walen) in the canton of St. Gallen, Switzerland. It belongs to the municipality of Quarten. As there are no roads leading to Quinten, it is only reachable by boat or on foot.

== Geography ==
Quinten consists of two main villages (Quinten and Au) and a large number of weekend houses that can be found throughout the villages. Au is the smaller of the two parts of Quinten and lies about 1 kilometre (0.62 mi) to the east of the main village. Both are on a hiking trail between Weesen and Walenstadt, which passes by the Betlis Chapel and Seerenbach Falls.

Situated below the Leistchamm and south-west of the seven peaks of the Churfirsten mountain range, Quinten lies at the foot of a steep terrain, which reaches from 419 m (1,375 ft) above sea level (mean level of the Walensee) to 2,193 m (7,195 ft) above sea level. The horizontal distance between the main village and Schären, the highest point, is about 2 kilometres (1.2 mi). The rock in and around Quinten mainly consists of limestone, which is responsible for the near-vertical cliffs towering above Quinten.

Due to the sheltered location, Quinten has one of the mildest climates known north of the Alps. For this reason, the northern coast of Walensee, and Quinten in particular, is sometimes nicknamed "the riviera". This climate is an important factor for the local wine growing industry.

== History ==
The name of the hamlet probably goes back to early medieval times and the administration of the bishopric of Chur. It follows the pattern of other villages along the Walensee which are called Terzen and Quarten (based on Latin ordinal numbers: tertius, quartus, quintus). Accordingly, its coat of arms features the Roman numeral V.

The hamlet of Quinten belonged to the Abbey in Pfäfers from the 9th century AD before it became part of the Austrian dominion of Windegg. After 1438, it became part of the Landvogtei Gaster. In 1523, it became part of Quarten (since 2001 in the Sarganserland district).

The small local church was built in 1765. It contains some 20th-century frescos.

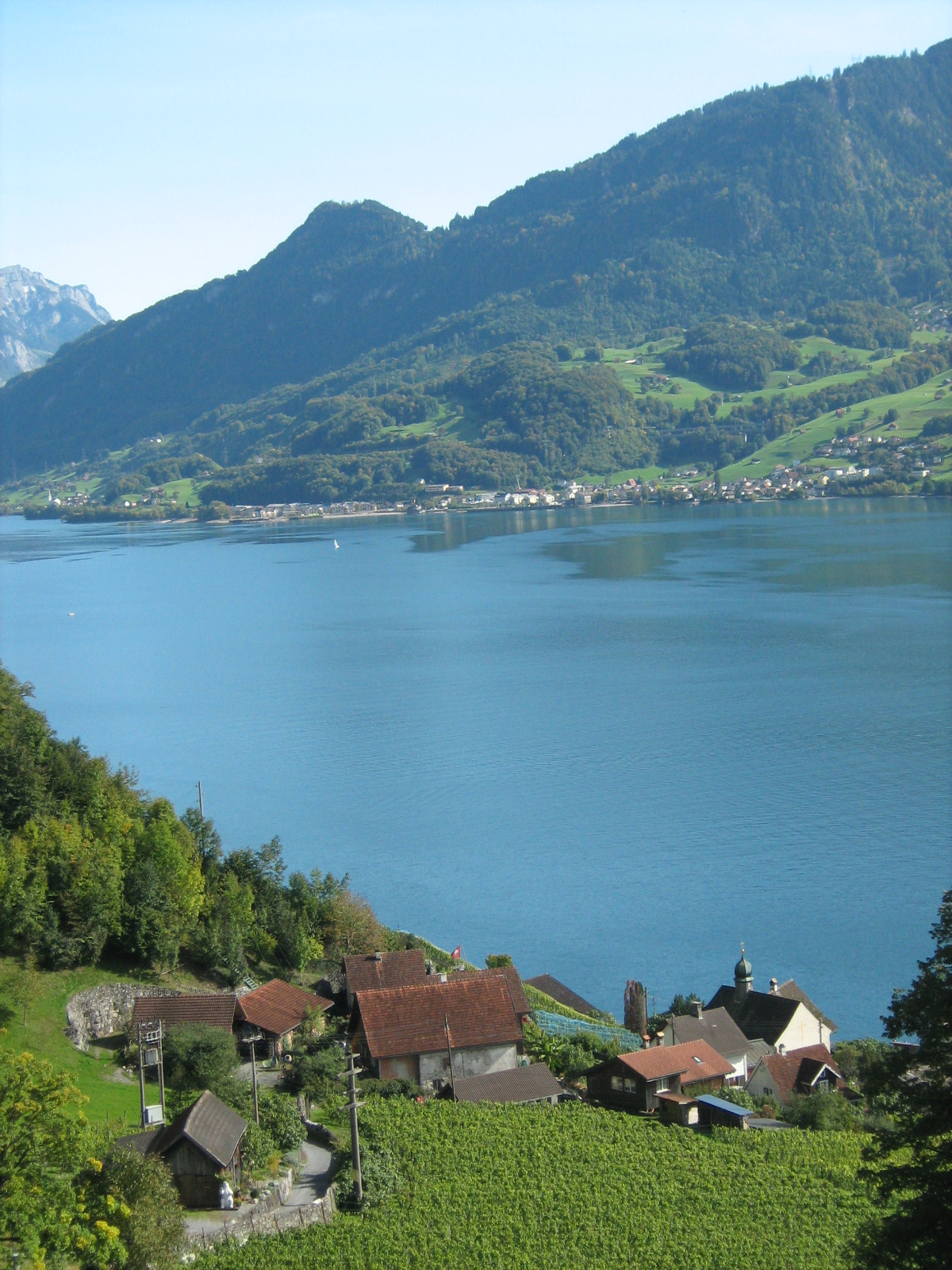
Quinten in early autumn

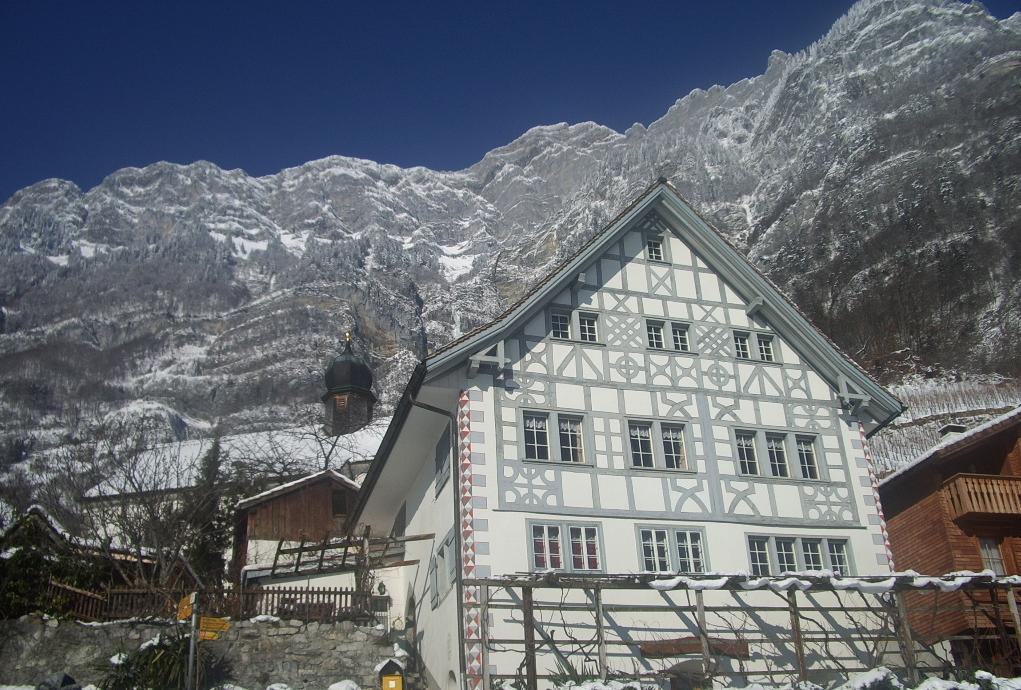
Quinten in winter, seen from the lake shore

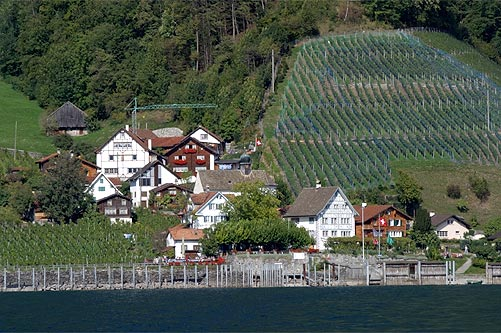
Quinten seen from the Walensee

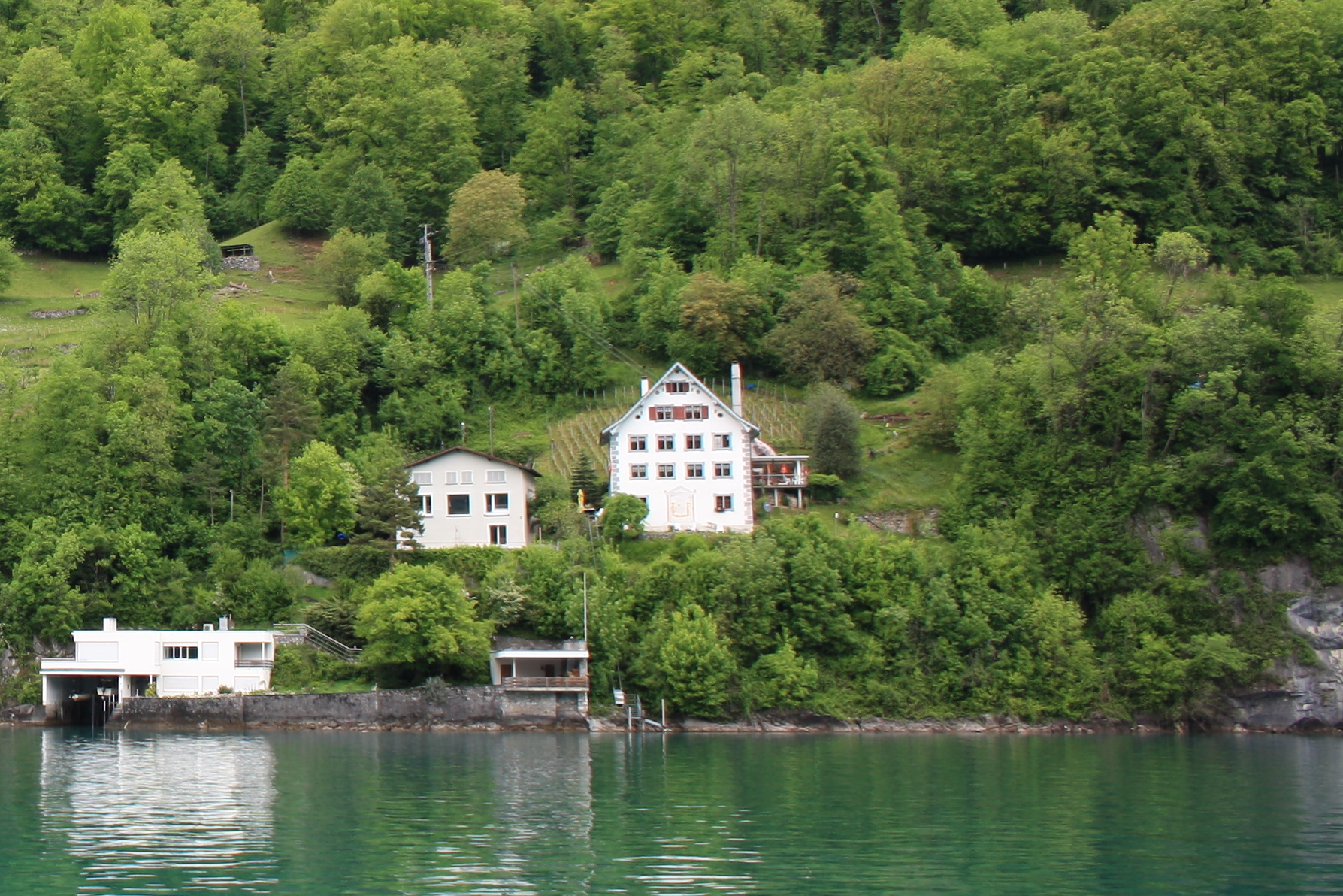
Kublihaus

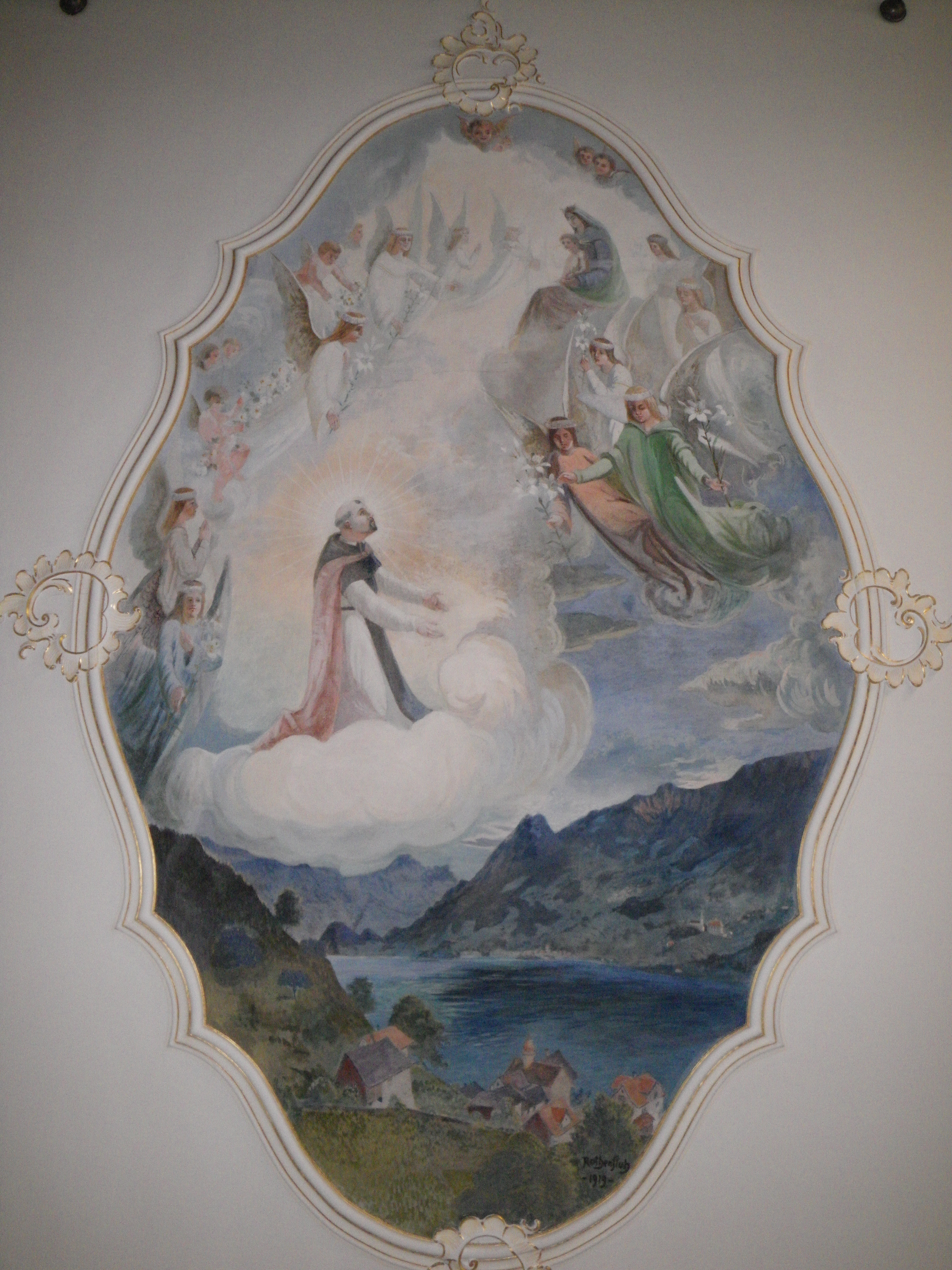
The ceiling fresco in the church

=== Johann Melchior Kubli ===
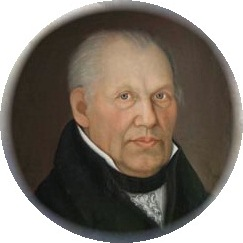
Johann Melchior Kubli

In 1807, the then well-known civil servant and politician Johann Melchior Kubli (1750–1835) moved to Quinten and the stately house to the west of the village that is still known as the Kublihaus. Kubli is primarily remembered for his role in the witch hunt trial against Anna Göldi in 1782. The secret trial, which was outrageous even by the standards of 1782, ended in the execution of the victim. Kubli is believed to have passed on secret documents regarding this process to German journalists who proceeded to publish them and caused a public outcry that was heard throughout most of Europe at the time.

=== Road access ===
In the 19th and 20th century, Quinten did not change much, as the absence of road connections made industrialization and commerce very difficult. One major change was the construction of the walking track that connects Quinten and Au in the early 20th century which made the life of the children of Au much easier, as they no longer had to climb steeply up and then down into Quinten, but could use the flat new track on their way to school. In the early 1930s it looked like Quinten's fate was about to change, when the construction of a road from Weesen at the western end to Walenstadt at the eastern end of the Walensee was discussed. Two projects were discussed, one along the northern side of the lake through Quinten, the other along the southern side. In the end the road was built on the southern side and Quinten was left to stay the quiet place it still is.

In the 1950s, electrical mains power reached Quinten which led to the arrival of weekenders who built their houses in Quinten starting around the same time. In 1960, the excursion boat service took up its operation, with a ferry to/from Murg and boat cruises linking all lakeside towns, both operated by Schiffsbetrieb Walensee. The village school ceased to exist in 1972.

== Economy ==
Agriculture, dominated by vineyards, is still an important factor in Quinten's economy. The locally grown wines, predominantly Pinot Noir which accounts for about 75% of the total harvest, enjoy a very good reputation among connoisseurs. Other varieties grown in Quinten include: Pinot Blanc, Baco Noir, Chardonnay, Chasselas, Merlot, Seyval Blanc and Syrah. In 2008 vineyards covered more than 76,000 square metres (820,000 sq ft), and more than 47 tonnes of grapes were harvested. Other forms of farming are on the retreat though, as the very steep terrain makes agricultural work very hard.

Thanks to the mild climate, exotic fruit, like figs and kiwifruit, thrive in Quinten in a way that is unique north of the Alps. These crops, however, are of little economic value and are mainly grown for the use of the locals.

Tourism and transport are two other major sources of income for the local population. There are two restaurants and a few small shops.

The population was 41 as of 2008.

== Books about Quinten ==
Quinten plays the starring role in the crime novel below. The book is only available in German.
https://web.archive.org/web/20070822111620/http://www.orteverlag.ch/pages/krimis/mord_am_walensee.htm

A book about local events throughout most of the 20th century. The book is only available in German.
https://web.archive.org/web/20110706222740/http://www.buecher.ch/suchergebnisse.html?pd=6565550
