= Federispitz =

Mountain in Switzerland

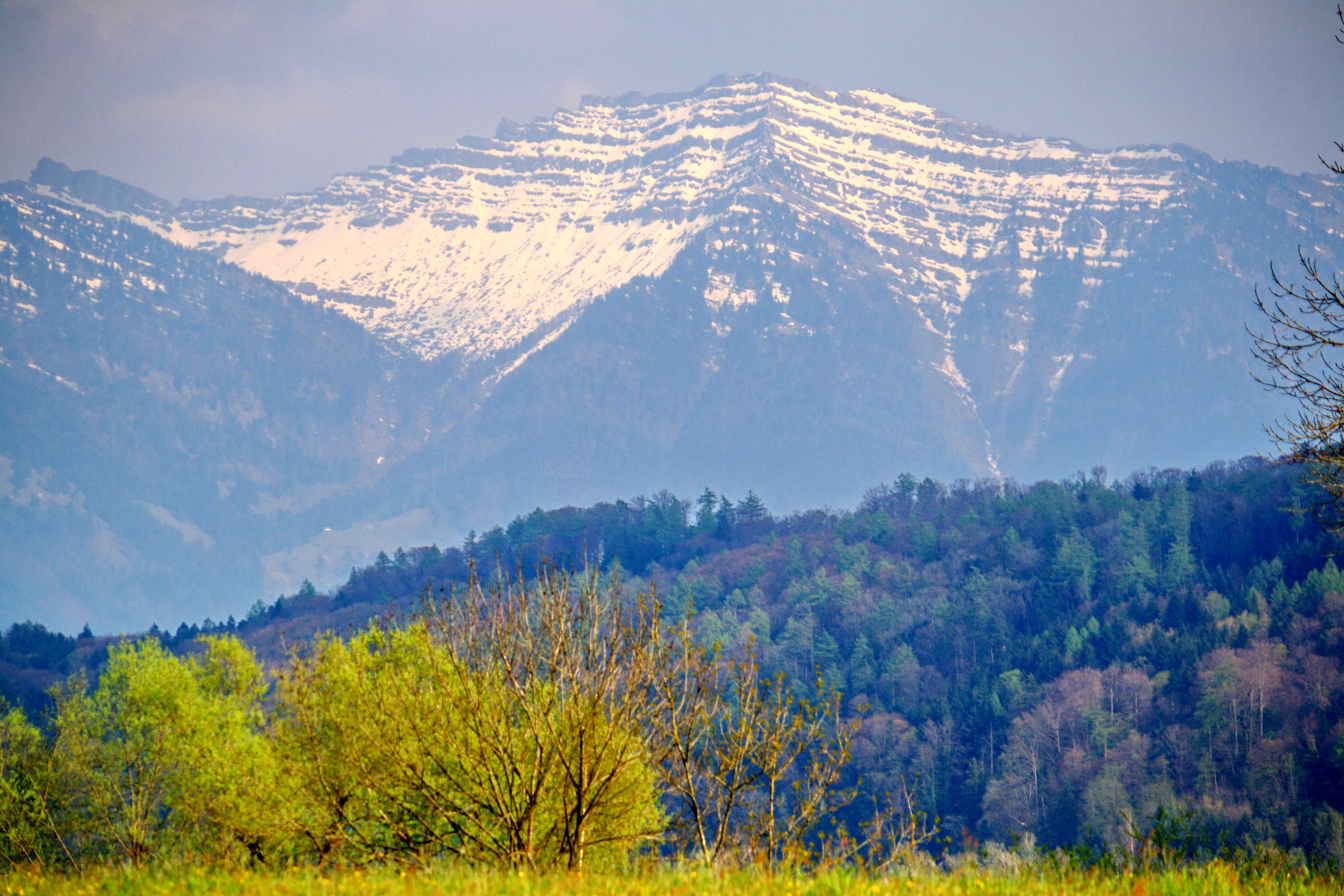
- View from the west side

Highest point
- Elevation: 1,865 m (6,119 ft)
- Prominence: 194 m (636 ft)
- Parent peak: Speer, Chüemettler
- Coordinates: 47°9′59.5″N 9°5′23″E

Geography
- Location within Alps Location within Switzerland Location within Canton of St. Gallen
- Location: Canton of St. Gallen
- Country: Switzerland
- Parent range: Appenzell Alps

The Federispitz is a mountain of the Appenzell Alps, situated in the canton of St. Gallen, with an elevation of 1,865 metres (6,119 ft). It lies south of the Speer and above the municipality of Schänis, overlooking the Walensee, the Linth Plain, and Lake Zurich.

Nearby mountains are the Mattstock and Mürtschenstock.

== See also ==
- List of mountains of the canton of St. Gallen
