= Murgseen =

Group of lakes in Switzerland

Coordinates: 47°2′22″N 9°9′40″E

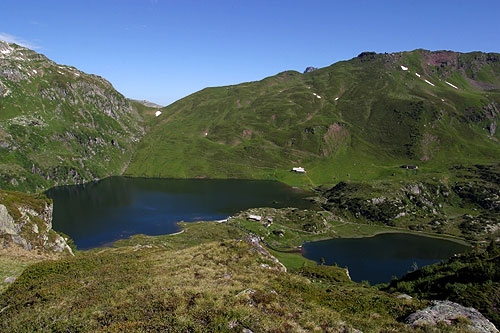
Oberer Murgsee and Mittlerer Murgsee

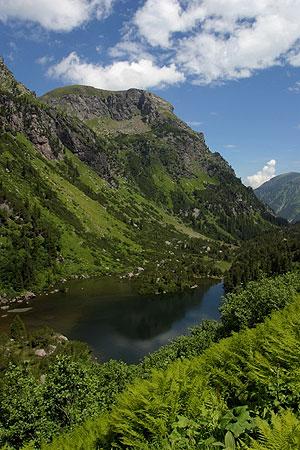
Unterer Murgsee

Murgseen are a group of lakes in Murgtal (Murg valley) in the Canton of St. Gallen, Switzerland. The three lakes are drained by the Murgbach river, which empties into Lake Walen at Murg in the municipality of Quarten.

The three lakes are:

- Oberer Murgsee (or "Ober Murgsee", Upper lake) at an elevation of 1,820 m; the largest, with a surface area of 20 ha
- Mittlerer Murgsee (or "Mittlerer Murgsee") at 1,808 m
- Unterer Murgsee (or "Unter Murgsee", Lower lake) at 1,682 m
