= Oberer Murgsee =

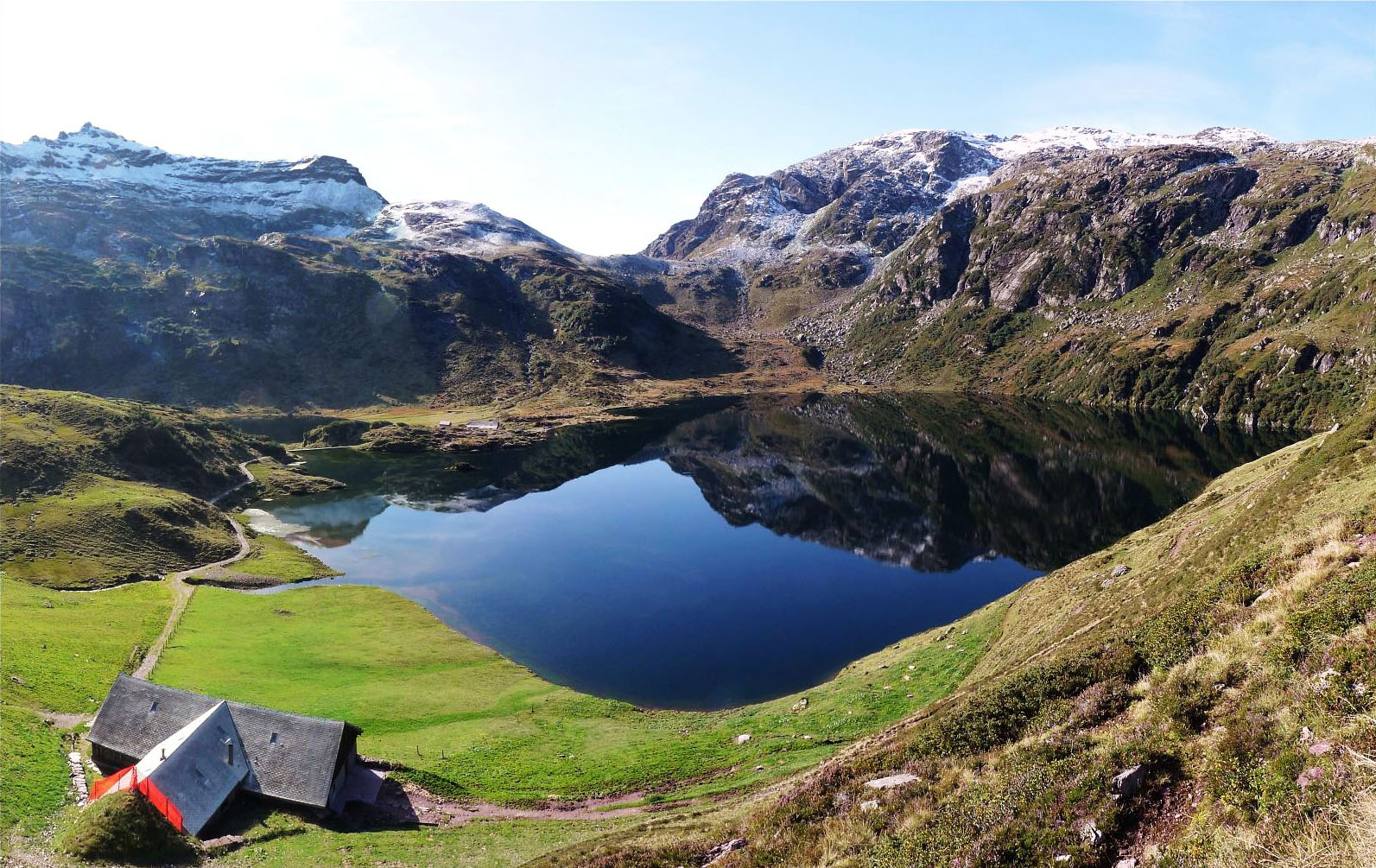

- Location within Canton of St. Gallen Location within Switzerland Location within Alps
- Interactive map of Oberer Murgsee
- Location: Quarten, Canton of St. Gallen
- Group: Murgseen
- Coordinates: 47°2′22″N 9°9′16″E
- Type: natural lake
- Primary inflows: Murgbach
- Primary outflows: Murgbach
- Basin countries: Switzerland
- Surface area: 18 ha (44 acres)
- Max. depth: 26 m (85 ft)
- Surface elevation: 1,820 m (5,970 ft)

Oberer Murgsee (or "Ober Murgsee") is a lake in the Murg valley (Murgtal), in the canton of St. Gallen, Switzerland. It is the highest of the three Murgseen.

The lake is drained by the Murgbach which empties into Lake Walen at Murg (municipality of Quarten).

== See also ==
- List of mountain lakes of Switzerland
