= Chüemettler =

Mountain in Switzerland

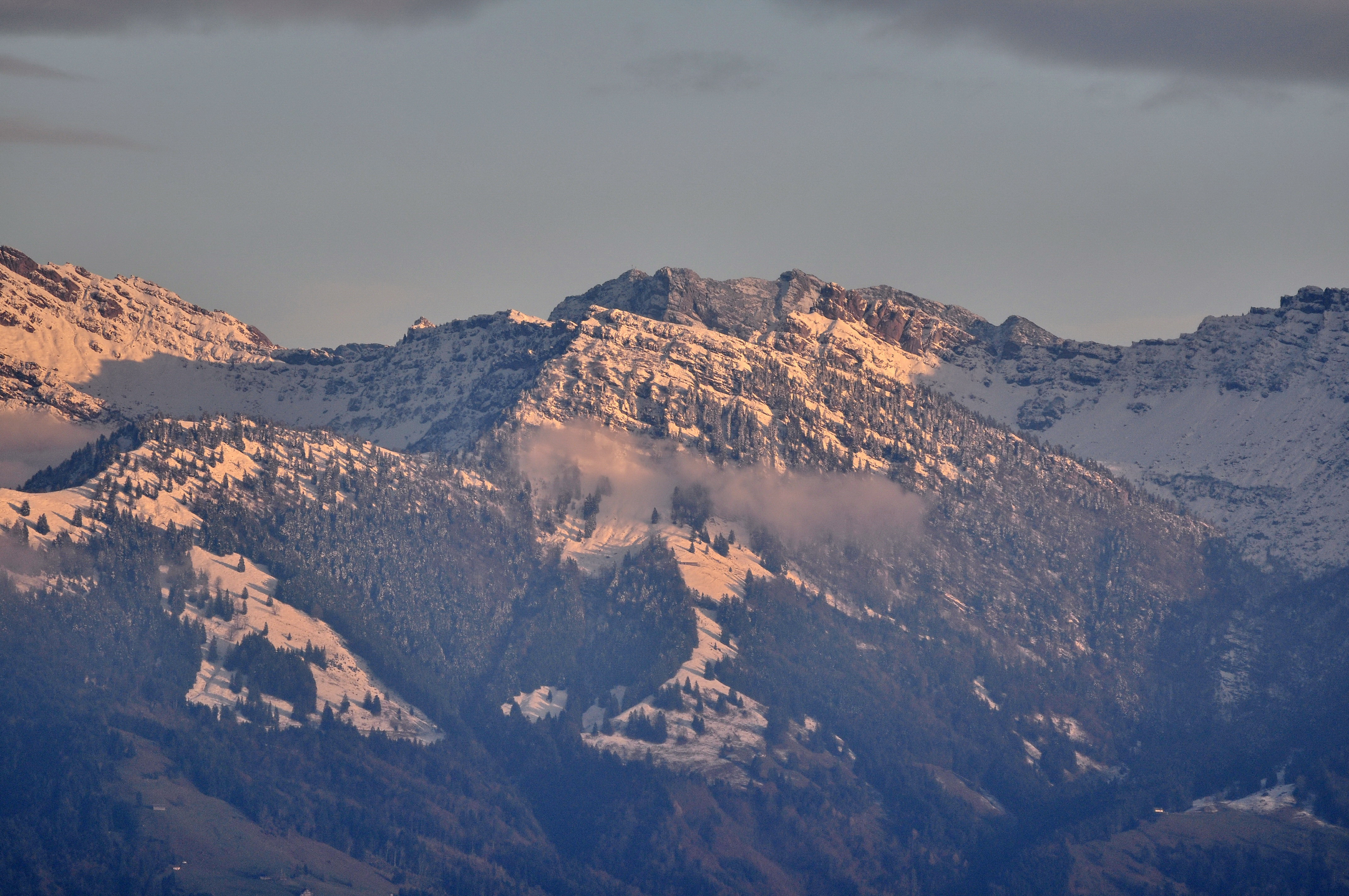
- as seen from the Obersee lake shore respectively towards Kempraten

Highest point
- Elevation: 1,703 m (5,587 ft)
- Prominence: 99 m (325 ft)
- Parent peak: Speer and Federispitz
- Coordinates: 47°10′47″N 9°5′46″E

Geography
- Location within Switzerland Location within Canton of St. Gallen
- Location: Canton of St. Gallen
- Country: Switzerland
- Parent range: Appenzell Alps

The Chüemettler (1,703 m [5,587 ft]) is a mountain of the Appenzell Alps in the canton of St. Gallen, overlooking Obersee (Lake Zurich). It lies west of the Speer and north of the Federispitz mountains.

== Name ==
Chüe literally means cows in Swiss-German language, Mettler is a family name, respectively a term used as name of several local areas.

== See also ==
- List of mountains of the canton of St. Gallen
