= Speer (mountain) =

Mountain in Switzerland

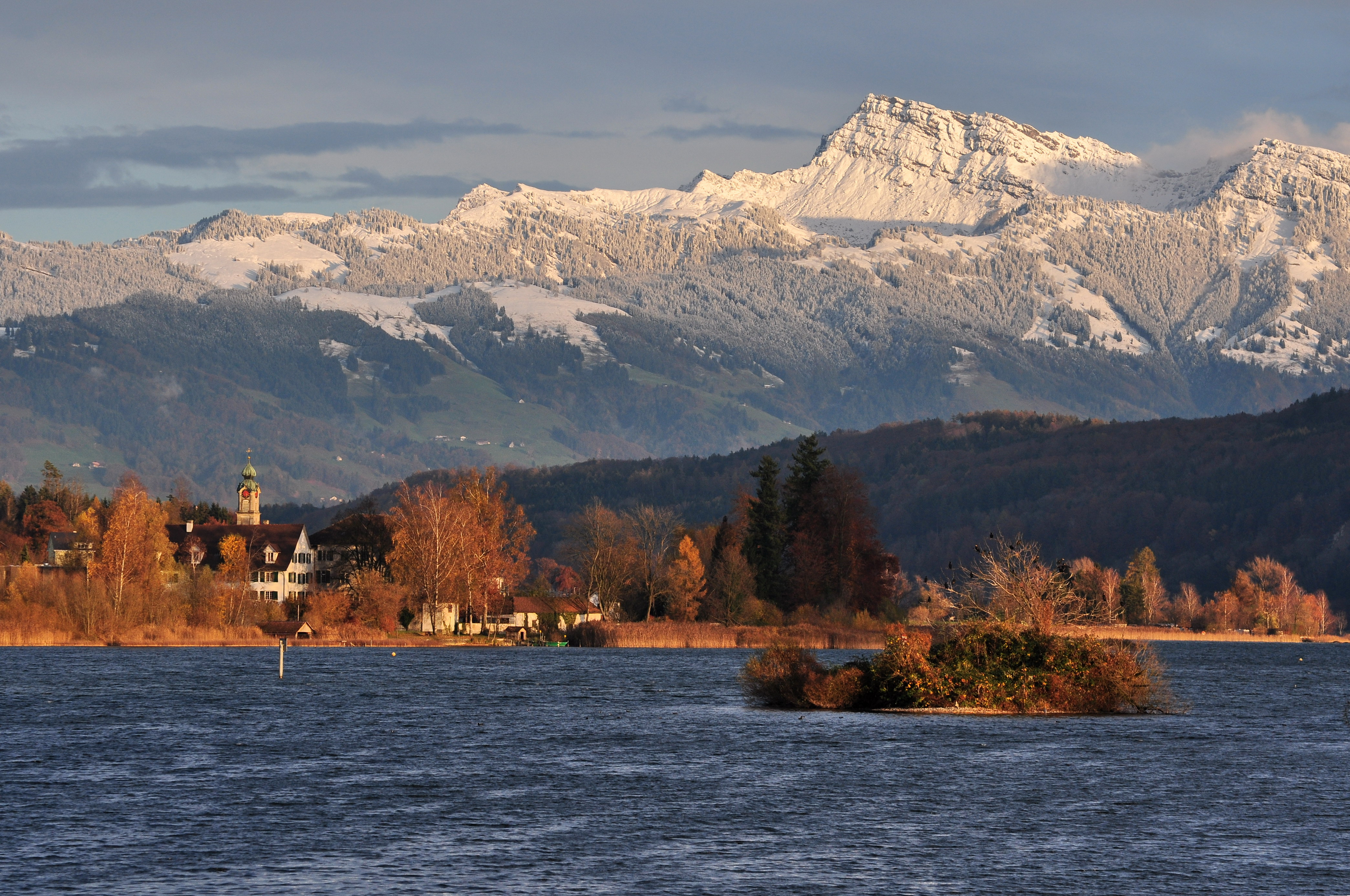
- View from Lake Zurich

Highest point
- Elevation: 1,951 m (6,401 ft)
- Prominence: 535 m (1,755 ft)
- Parent peak: Gamsberg, Chüemettler
- Coordinates: 47°11′08″N 9°07′22″E

Geography
- Location within Alps Location within Switzerland Location within Canton of St. Gallen
- Location: Canton of St. Gallen
- Country: Switzerland
- Parent range: Appenzell Alps

Climbing
- Easiest route: Trail

The Speer is a mountain in the Appenzell Alps with an elevation of 1,951 metres (6,401 ft), located in the canton of St. Gallen, Switzerland. It is situated between the Toggenburg valley, the Linth Plain, and Lake Zurich, overlooking the region between Lake Zurich and Lake Walen.

Being easily accessible (e.g. from Amden), the summit is popular for its panoramic view of the Alps and Prealps from central to eastern Switzerland. The ascent, however, involves a few hours of hiking.

Nearby mountains are the Federispitz and Mattstock.

Gallery

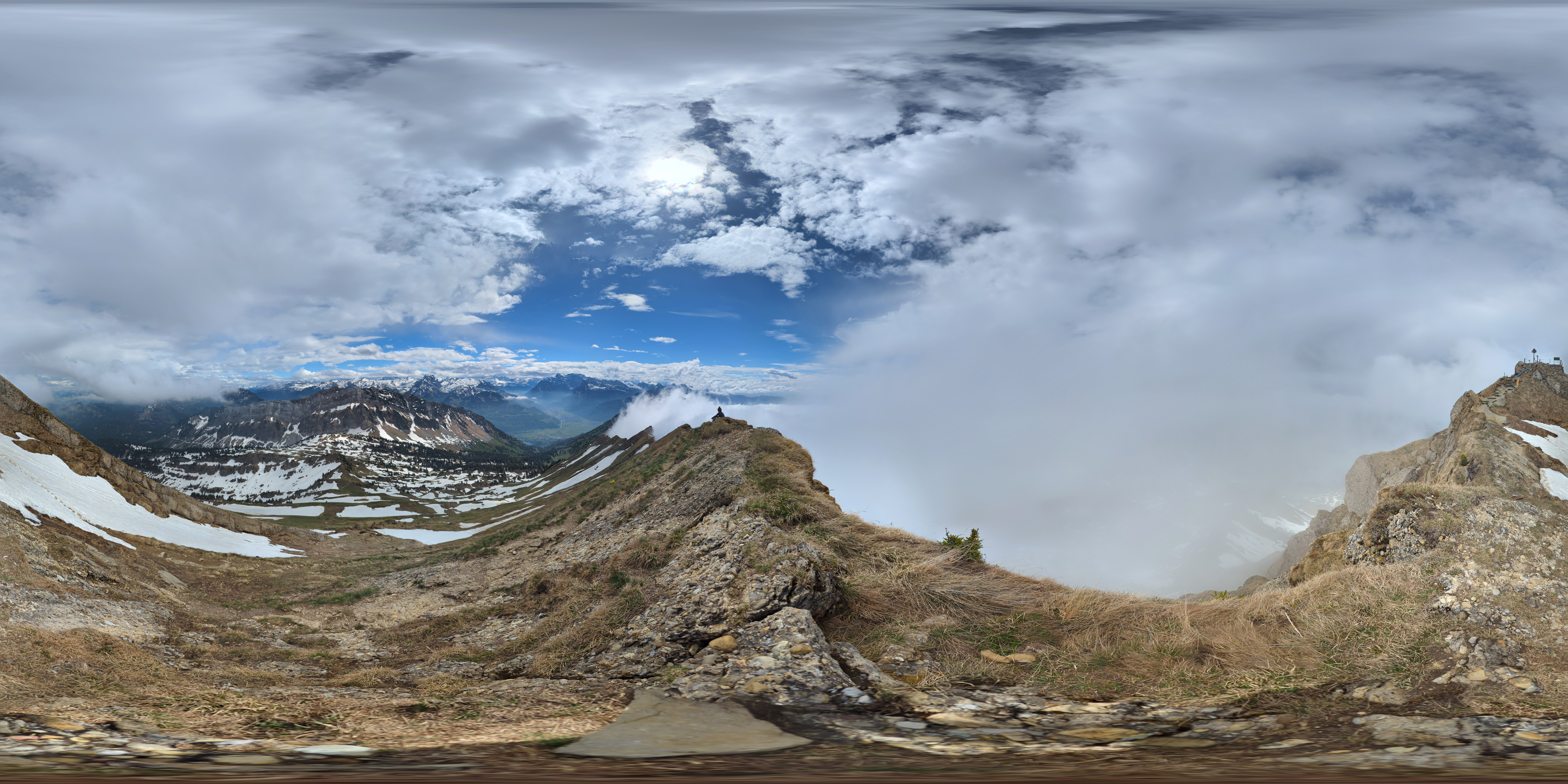
360° summit view in May

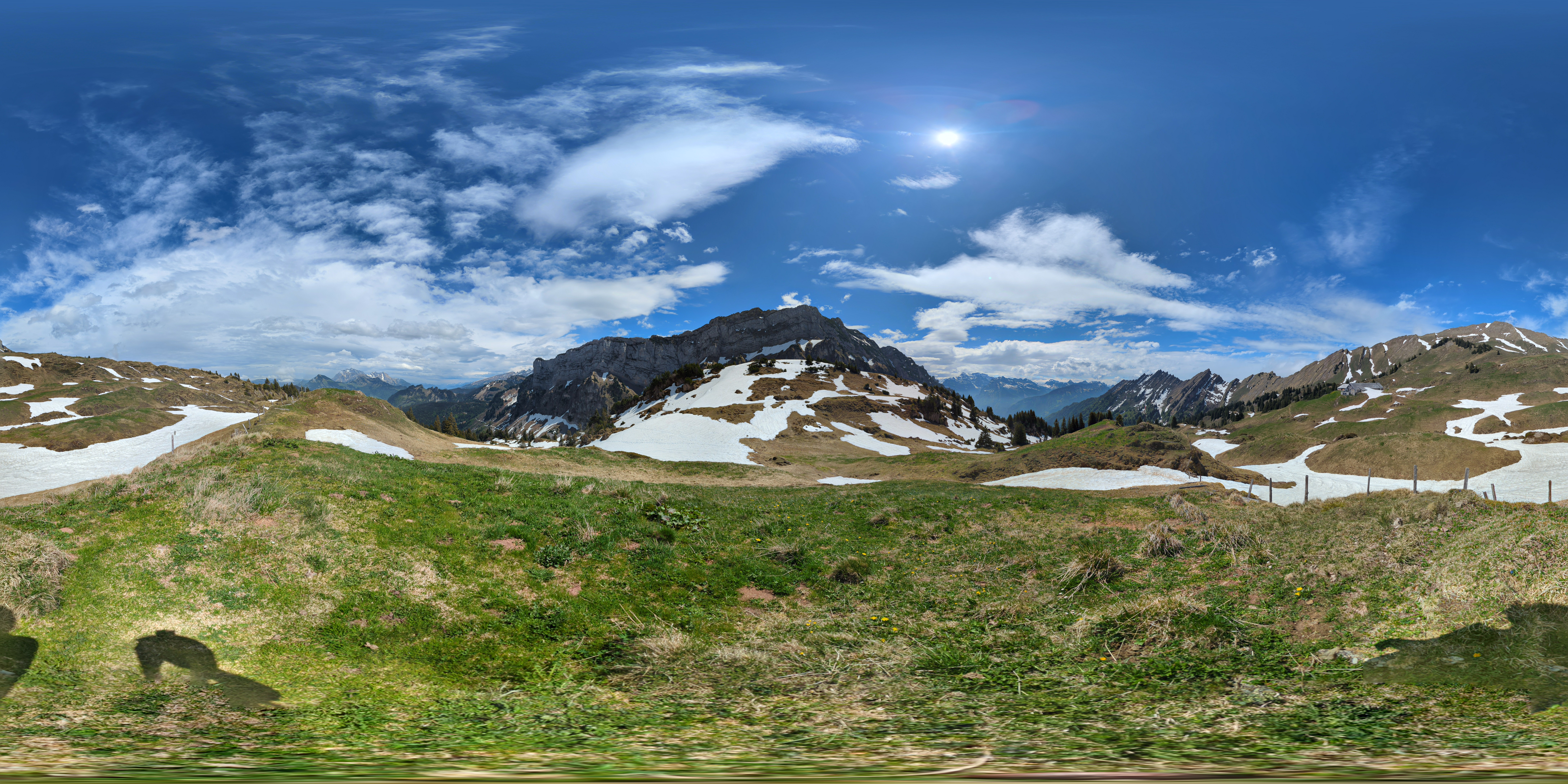
360° view near Alp Oberkäseren in May

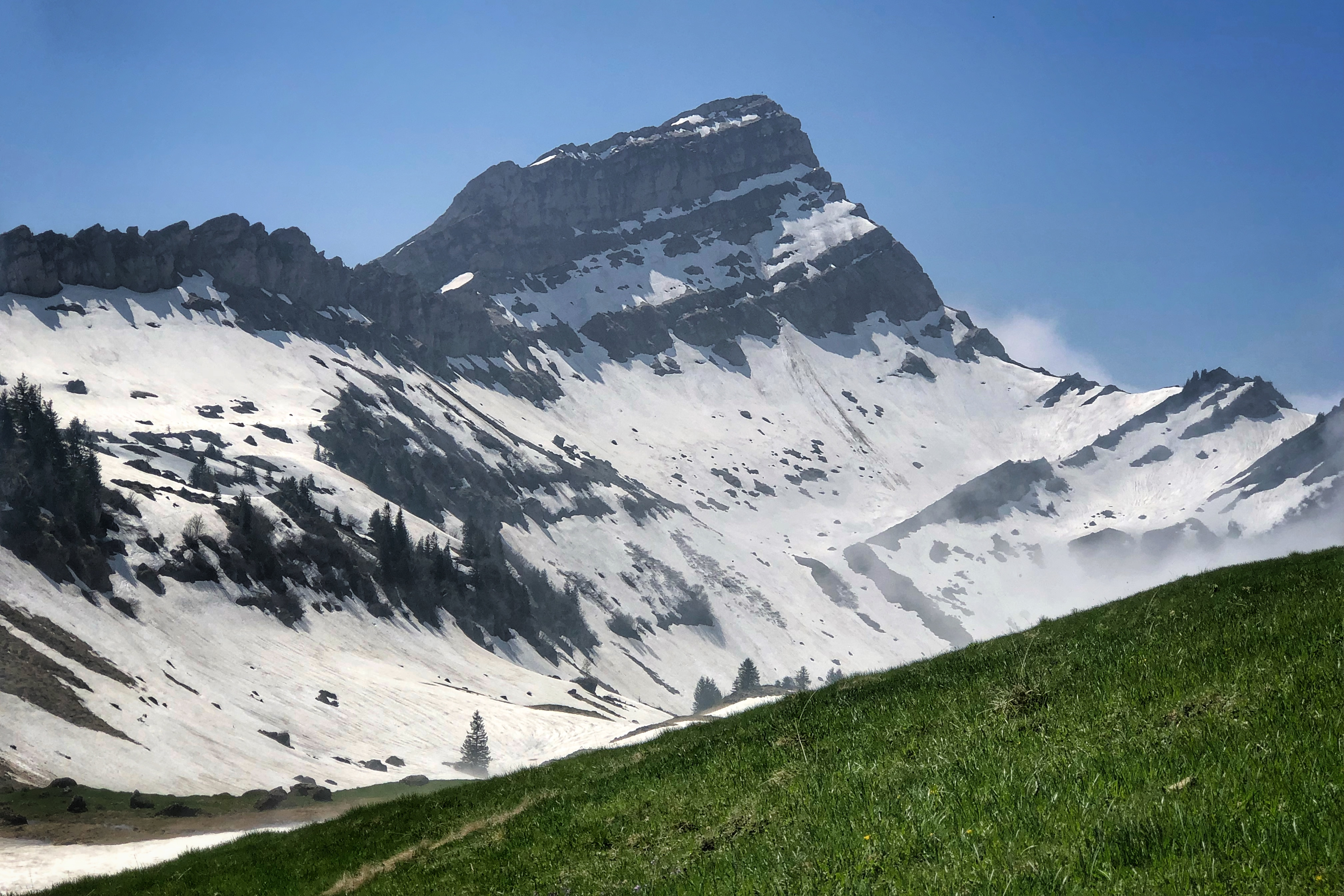
Speer from the northeast in May

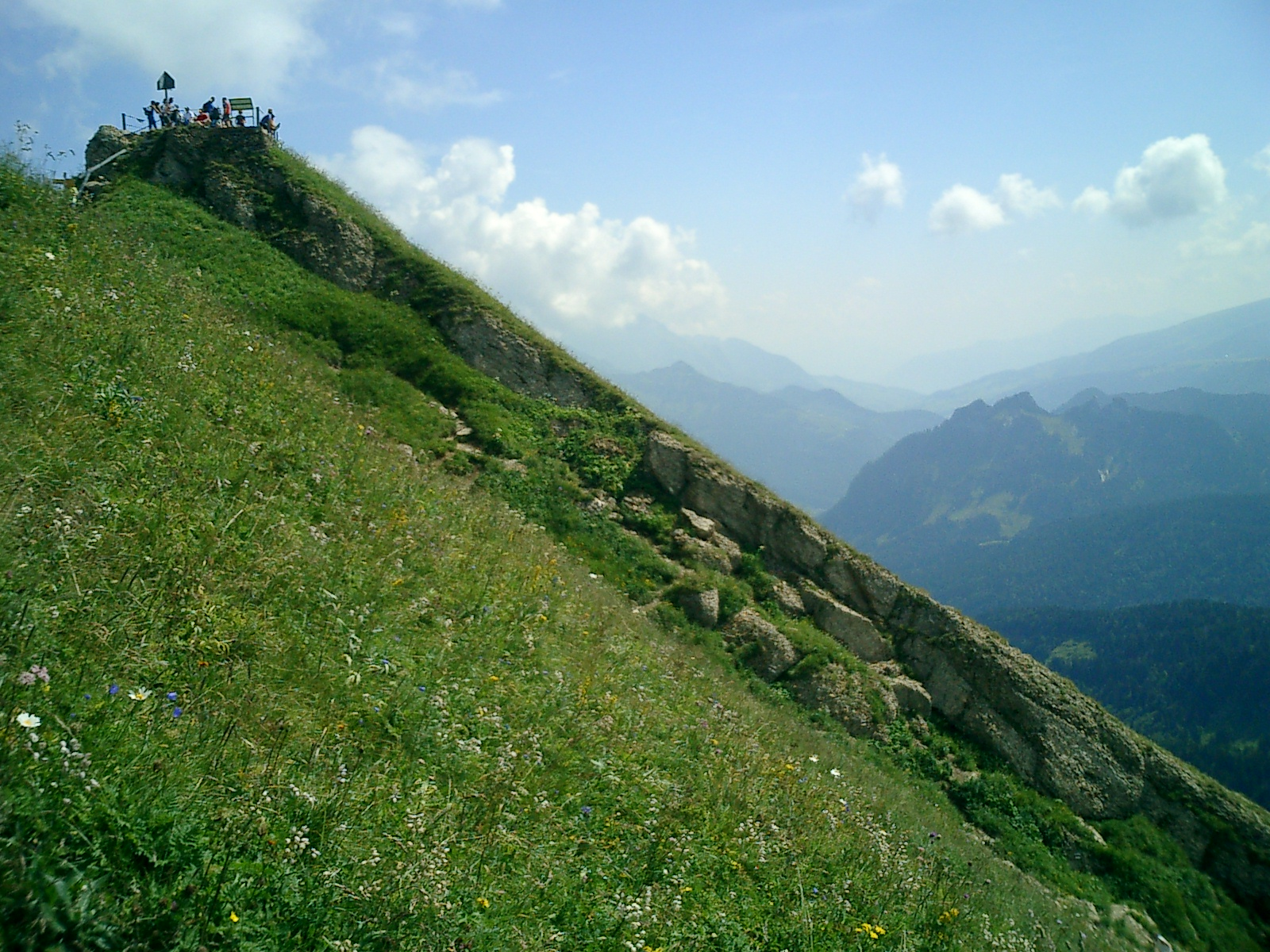
Summit in July

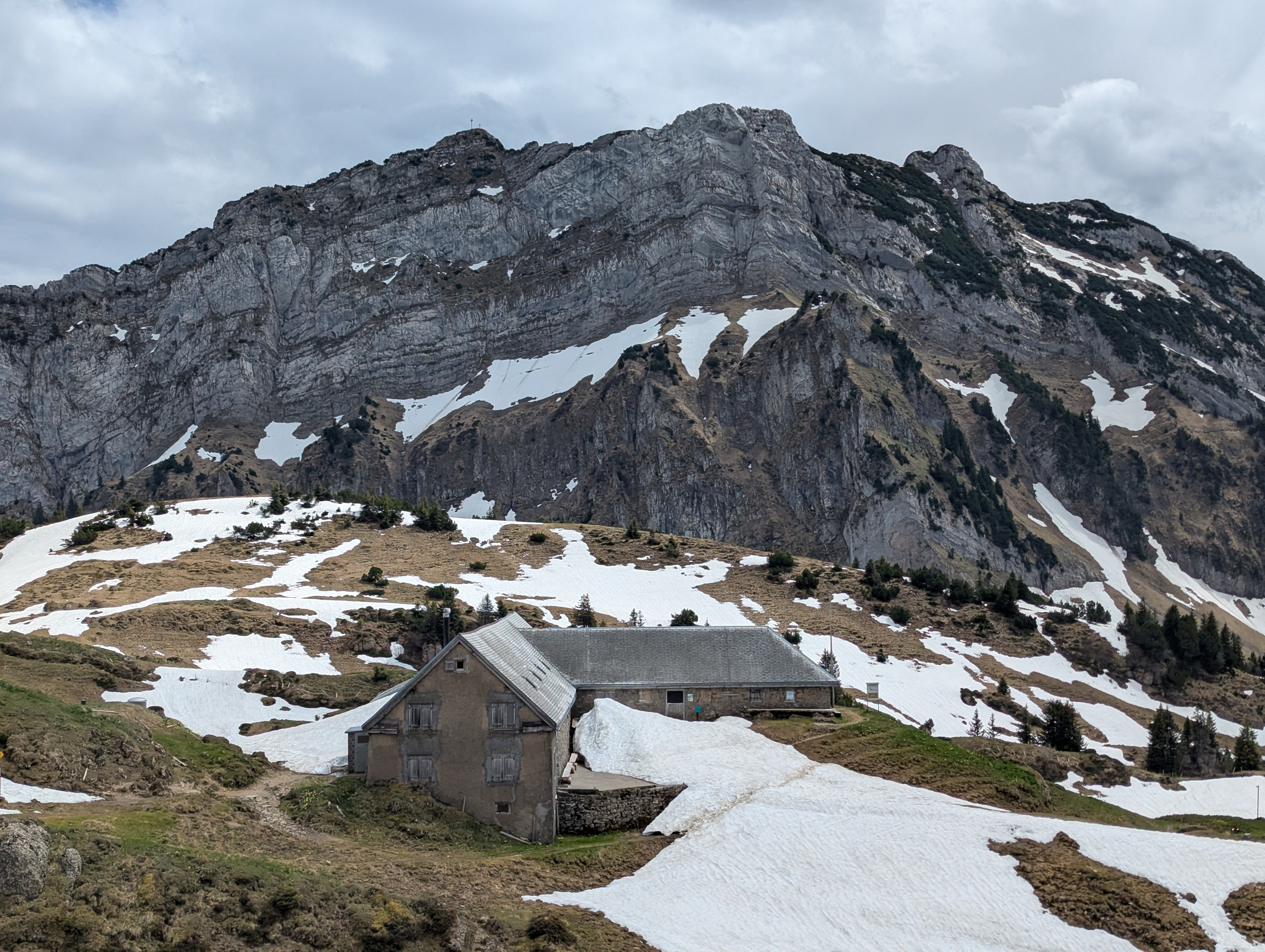
Alp Oberkäseren with Mattstock behind it in May

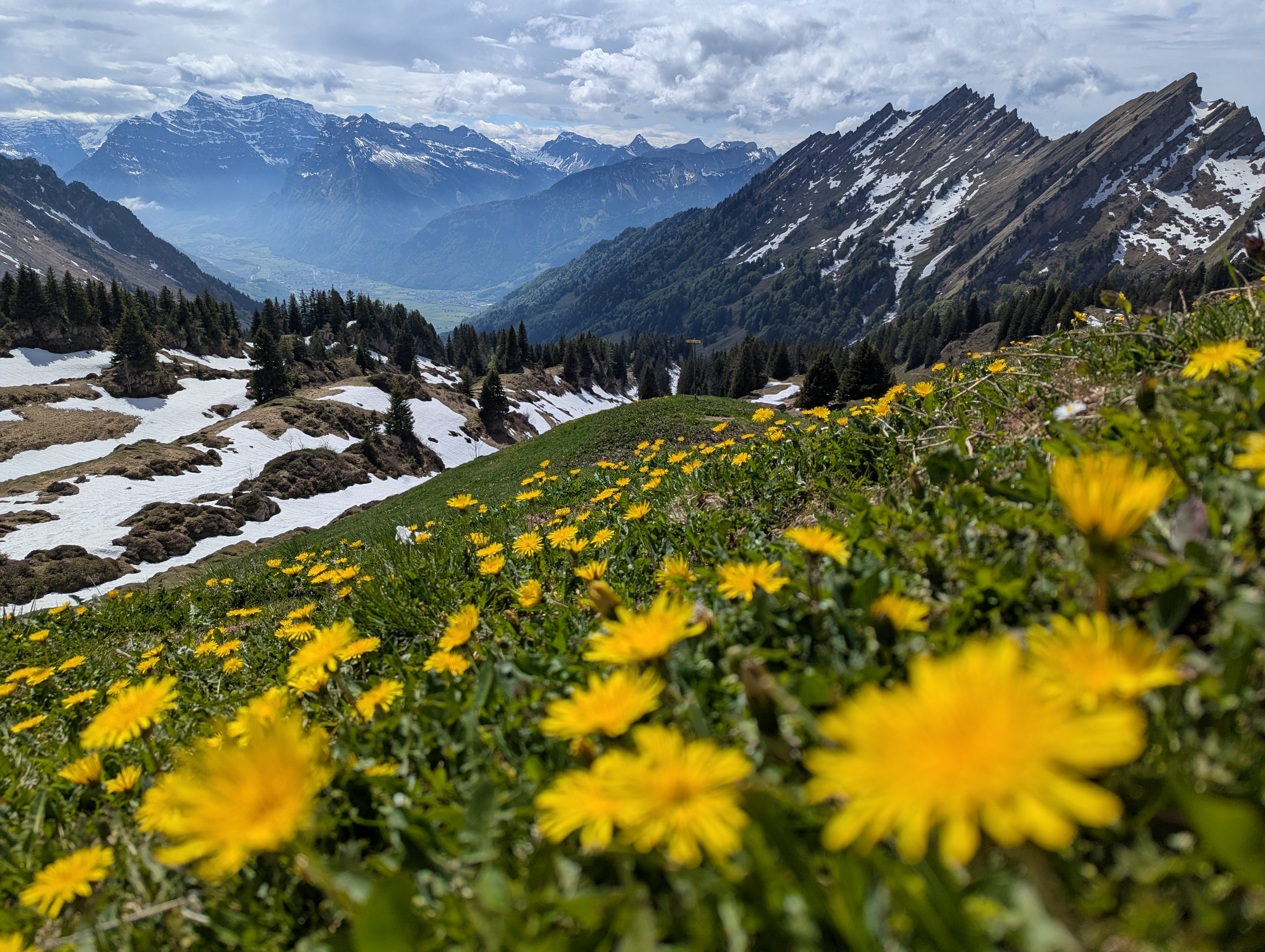
Dandelions on the slopes in May

== See also ==
- List of mountains of the canton of St. Gallen
