= Schnittlauchinsel =

Island in the Walensee, Switzerland

Coordinates: 47°07′06″N 9°17′16″E

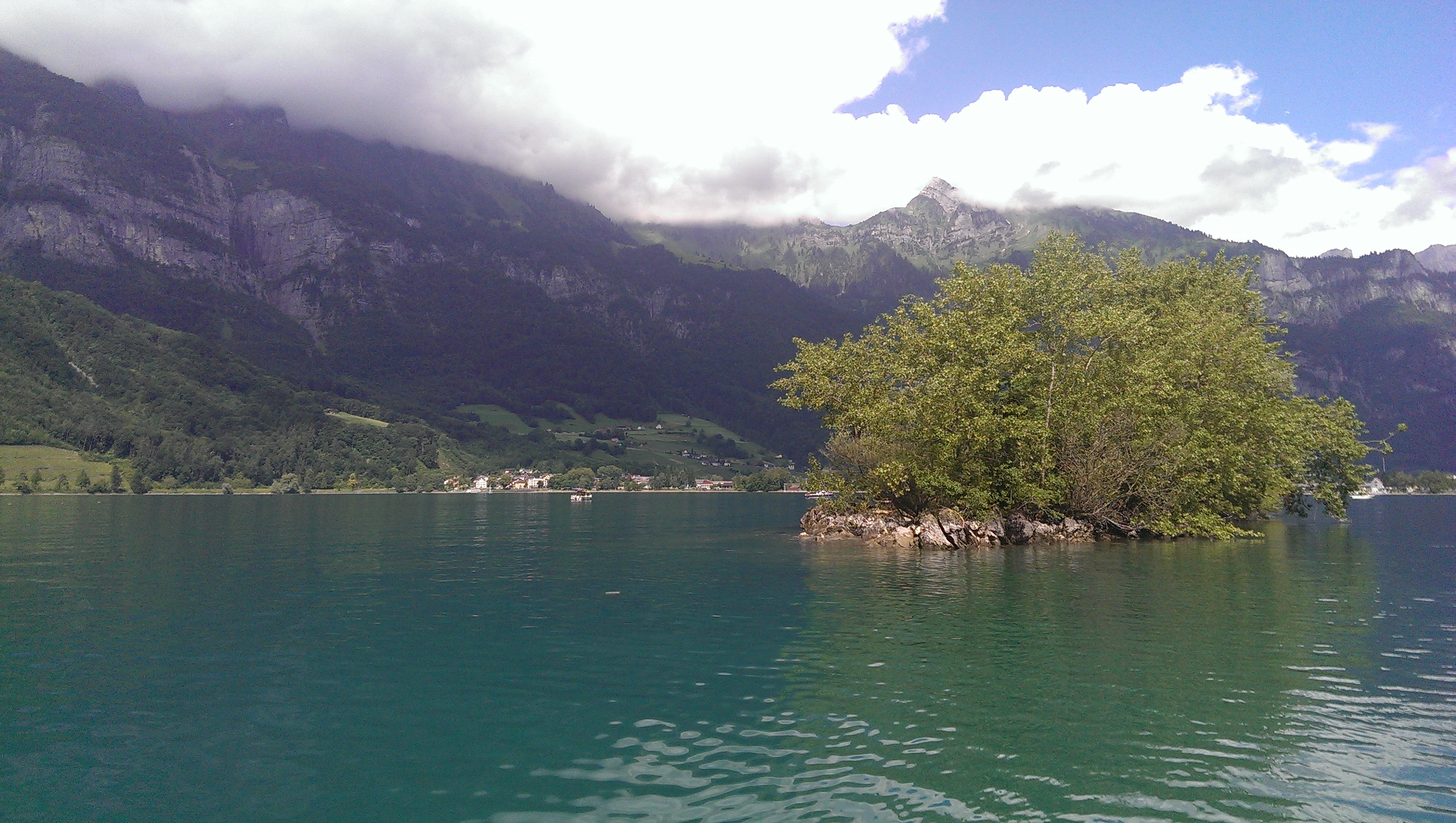
- View from the west
- Other names: Schwaneninsel, Bommersteinsinsel

Geography
- Location: Walensee
- Highest elevation: 420 m (1380 ft)

Administration
- Switzerland
- Canton: St. Gallen
- District: Sarganserland

The Schnittlauchinsel (lit. 'chives island') is an island in Lake Walen (Walensee), located in the canton of St. Gallen, Switzerland. It is the only island in the lake apart from small islands near the shores at Unterterzen.

The name refers to the shape of the island in areal view. It has a length of 80 metres (260 ft) and a maximum width of 20 metres (66 ft). Its highest point is 420 metres (1,380 ft) above sea level, only 1 metre above lake level (419 m / 1,375 ft). The minimum distance from the shore is about 320 metres (1,050 ft).

Politically, the island belongs to the municipality of Quarten in the district of Sarganserland.

== See also ==
- List of islands of Switzerland
