= Betlis Chapel =

- Kapelle Betlis
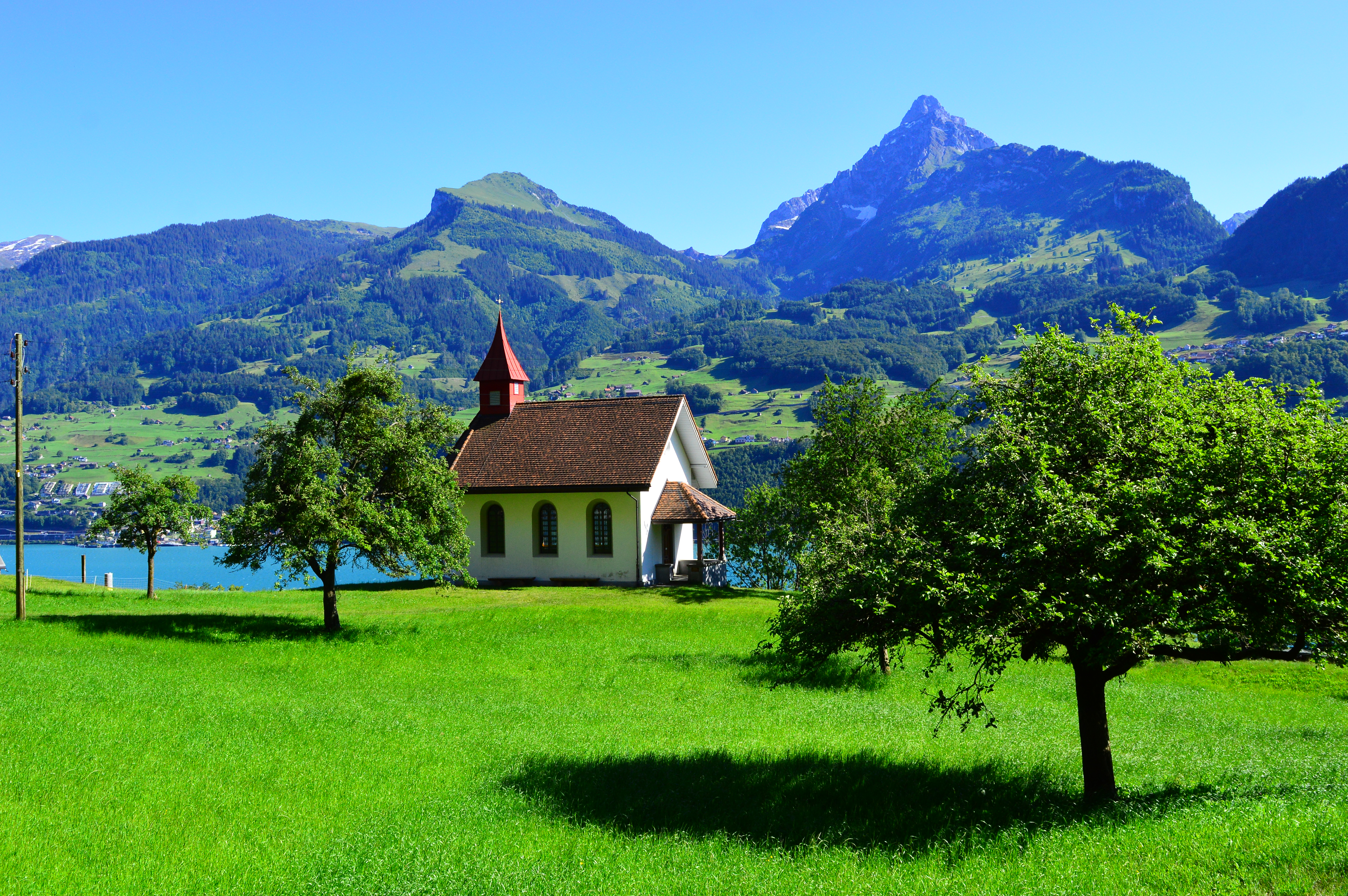
- The chapel in 2020, looking south to the peaks of Mürtschenstock and Gufelstock, across the Walensee
- Betlis Chapel
- 47°08′09″N 9°09′38″E
- Location: Amden
- Country: Switzerland

History
- Dedication: Our Lady of Perpetual Help

Architecture
- Architect: August Hardegger
- Years built: 1889 (137 years ago)

Betlis Chapel (or Kapelle Betlis) is a chapel in the village of Amden, canton of St. Gallen, Switzerland.

The original chapel stood on the site, below Strahlegg Castle and between Seerenbach Falls and the Walensee, in the 14th century. Damaged by water, that chapel was demolished in 1773. Today's chapel was erected in 1889, dedicated to Our Lady of Perpetual Help. It was built by Giovanni Vittori, to a design by August Hardegger.
