= Mattstock =

Mountain in Switzerland

- Mattstogg
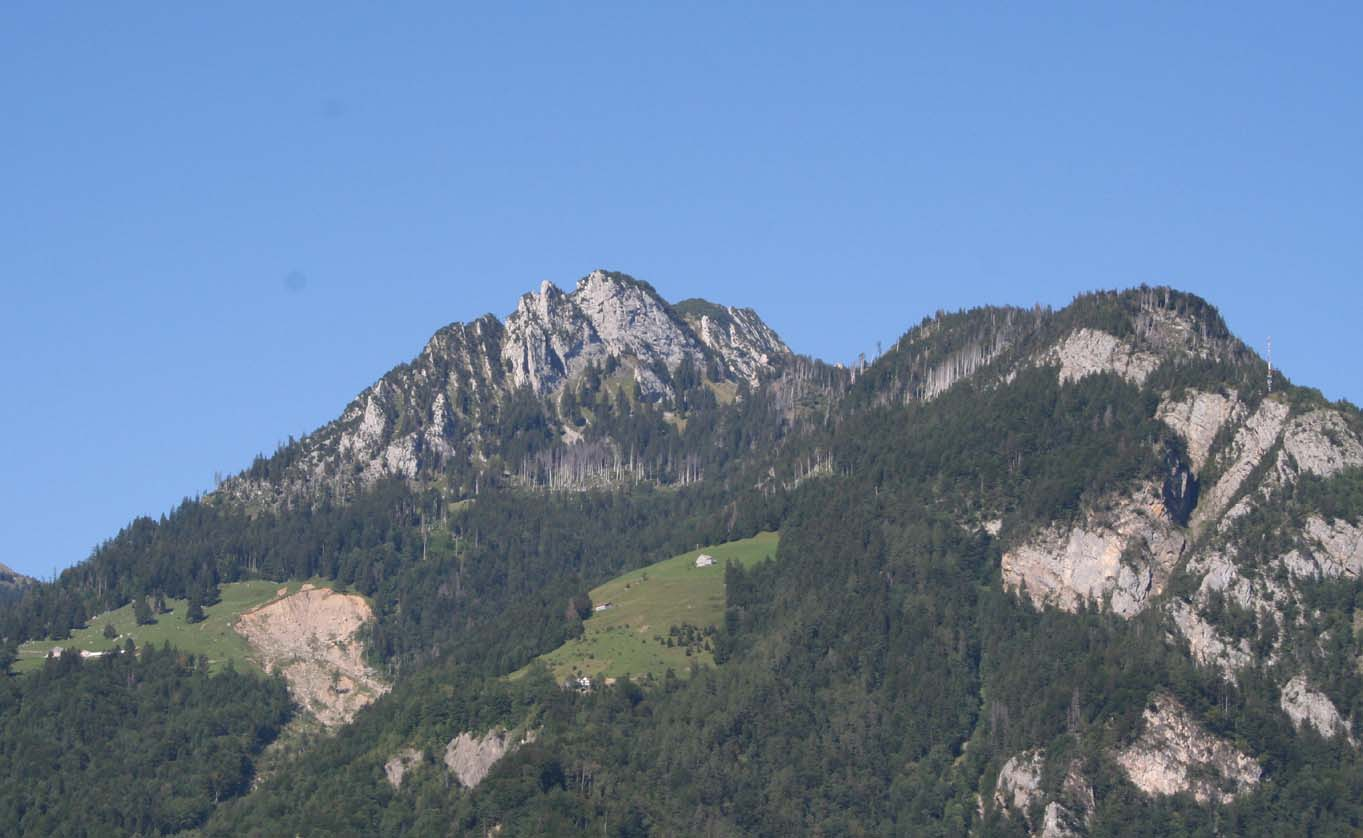
- View from the south side (summit not visible)

Highest point
- Elevation: 1,936 m (6,352 ft)
- Prominence: 358 m (1,175 ft)
- Parent peak: Speer
- Coordinates: 47°10′11″N 9°8′8.5″E

Geography
- Location within Alps Location within Switzerland Location within Canton of St. Gallen
- Location: Canton of St. Gallen
- Country: Switzerland
- Parent range: Appenzell Alps

The Mattstock (also known as Mattstogg) is a mountain of the Appenzell Alps with an elevation of 1,936 metres (6,352 ft), overlooking the Walensee in the canton of St. Gallen. It lies south of the Speer, on the range between the Toggenburg and the Linth valley. It is the Hausberg of Amden.

== See also ==
- List of mountains of the canton of St. Gallen
