= Mürtschenstock =

Mountain in Switzerland

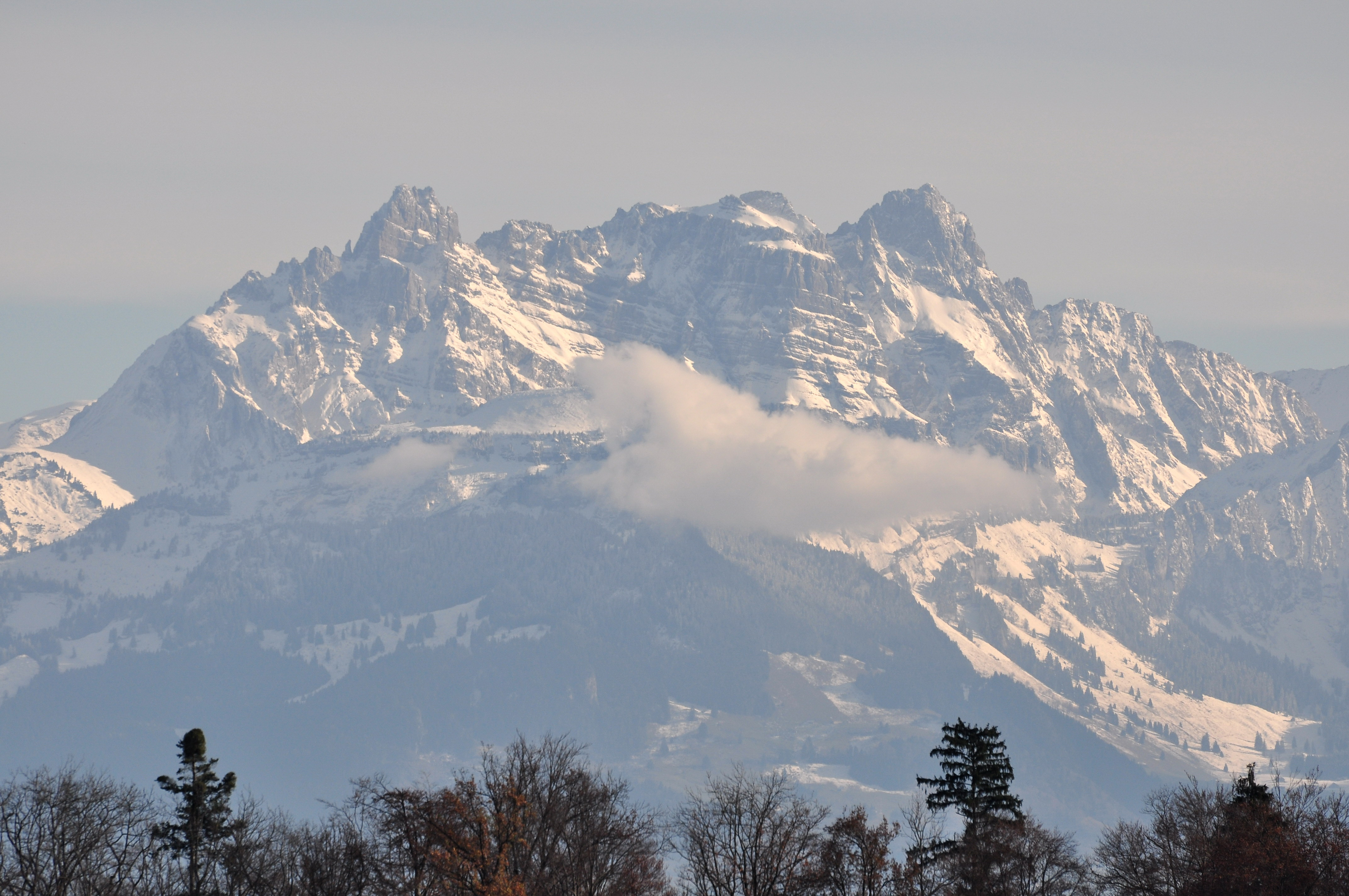
- The Mürtschenstock seen from the Pfannenstiel (west side), from left (north) to right (south) the peaks Stock, Fulen, and Ruchen (highest)

Highest point
- Peak: Ruchen
- Elevation: 2,441 m (8,009 ft)
- Prominence: 601 m (1,972 ft)
- Coordinates: 47°4′10.4″N 9°8′41.3″E

Geography
- Location within Switzerland Location within Canton of Glarus Location within Alps
- Location: Glarus Nord, Glarus
- Country: Switzerland
- Parent range: Glarus Alps
- Topo map: Swiss Federal Office of Topography swisstopo

The Mürtschenstock is a mountain massif of the Glarus Alps in the canton of Glarus overlooking Lake Walen (Walensee) and the Linth Valley. It is composed of several summits, of which the highest, named Ruchen, has an elevation of 2,441 metres (8,009 ft) above sea level. The two other main summits are the Fulen (2,410 m [7,910 ft]) and the Stock (2,390 m [7,840 ft]).

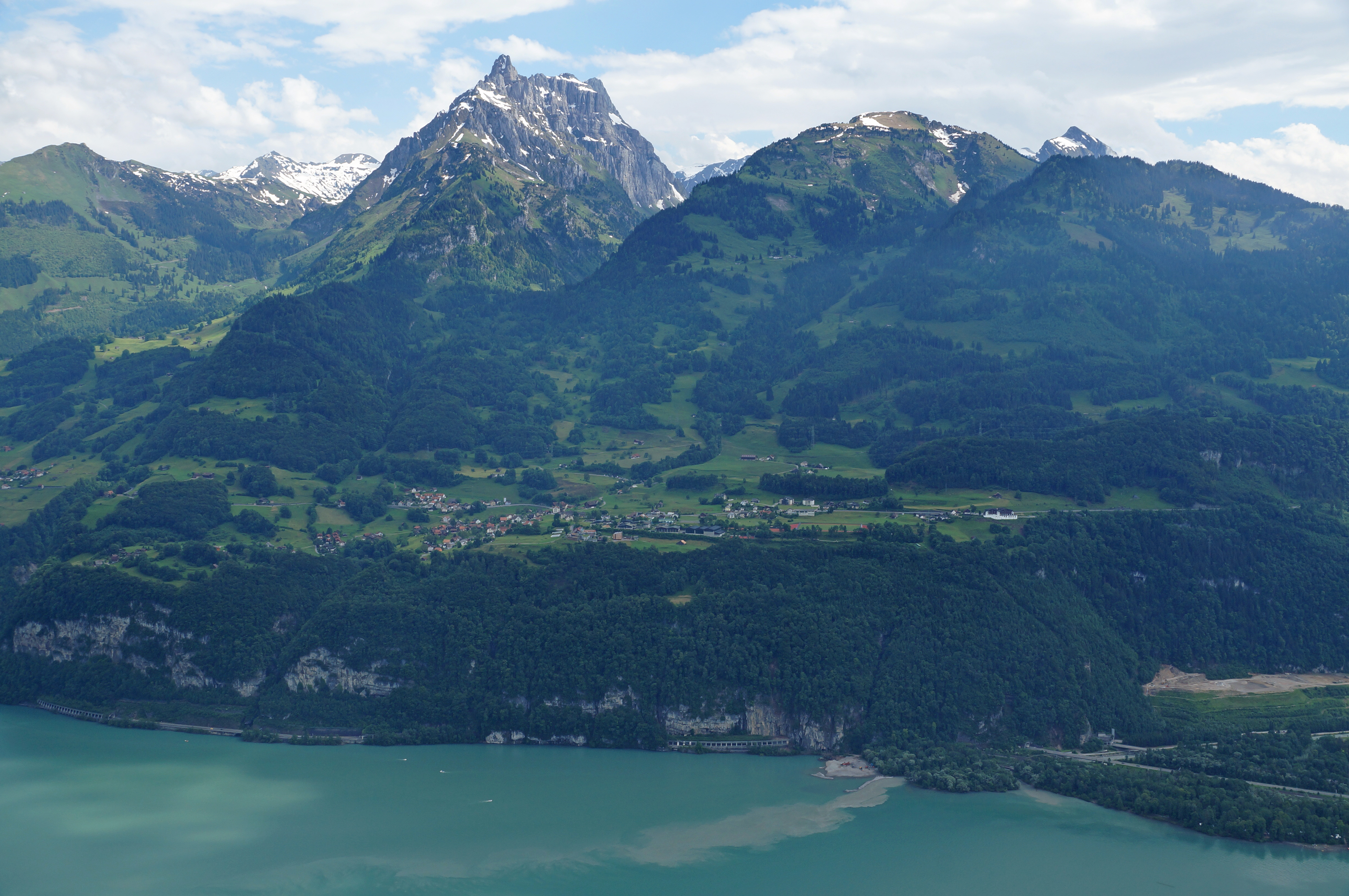
View of the Mürtschenstock from across the Walensee (north side)

== See also ==
- List of mountains of the canton of Glarus
