= Walensee =

Lake in Switzerland

- Lake Walen; Lake Walenstadt
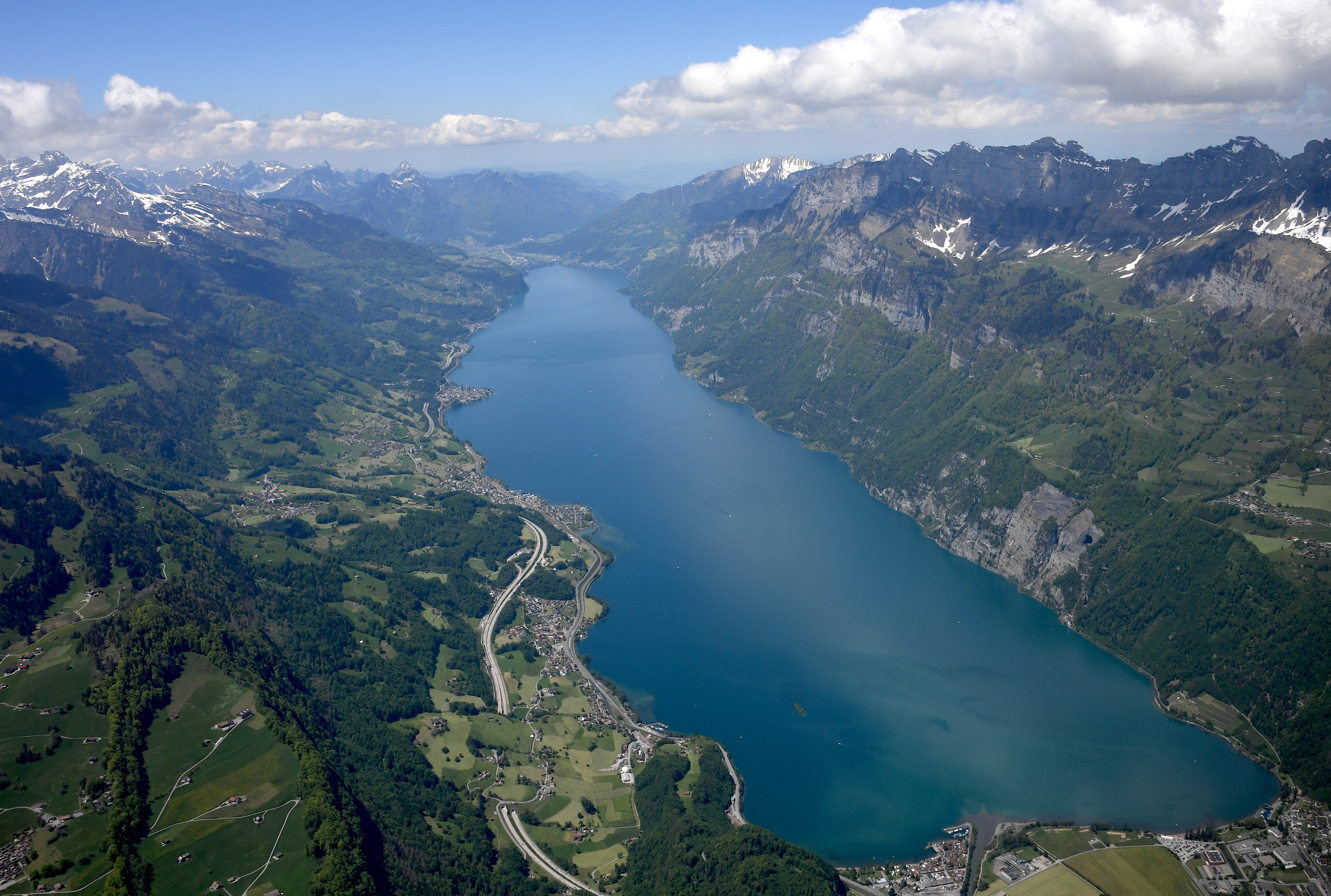
- Aerial view from the east

- Location within Canton of St. Gallen Location within Canton of Glarus Location within Switzerland Location within Alps
- Interactive map of Walensee
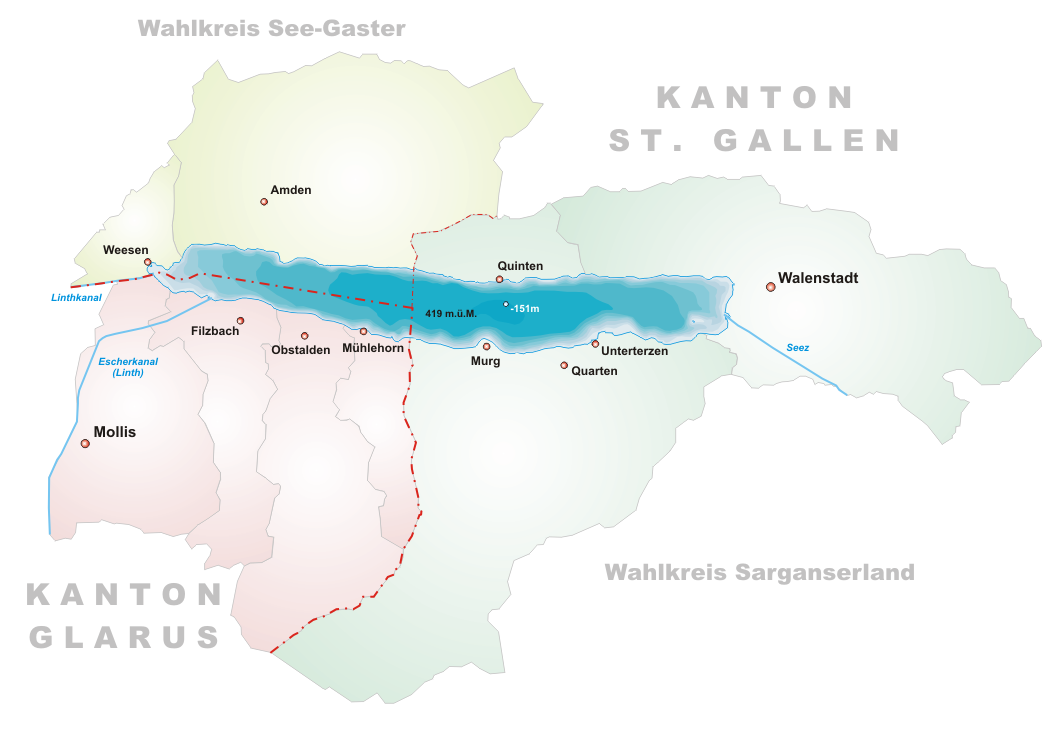
- Map
- Location: St. Gallen, Glarus
- Coordinates: 47°7′N 9°12′E
- Primary inflows: Linth (Escherkanal), Seez, Murgbach
- Primary outflows: Linth canal
- Basin countries: Switzerland
- Surface area: 24.19 km^{2} (9.34 sq mi)
- Average depth: 104.7 m (344 ft)
- Max. depth: 151 m (495 ft)
- Water volume: 2.5 km^{3} (2,000,000 acre⋅ft)
- Residence time: 1.45 years
- Surface elevation: 419 m (1,375 ft)
- Islands: Schnittlauchinsel
- Settlements: Walenstadt, Weesen, Quinten, Quarten, Murg

The Walensee (German pronunciation: [ˈvaːln̩ˌzeː]), also known as Lake Walen and Lake Walenstadt (after Walenstadt), is one of the larger lakes in Switzerland. Located in the east of the country, about two thirds of its area are in the canton of St. Gallen and about one third in the canton of Glarus.

== Name ==
Its name means 'Lake of the Walhaz' (German: See der Welschen), since in the early Middle Ages Walensee formed the linguistic border between the Alemanni, who settled in the west, and the Romansh people, the Walhaz (Welschen), in the east.

== Geography ==
The lake lies in a valley between the Appenzell Alps to the north and the Glarus Alps to the south. It has a long east-west extension but is relatively narrow in north-south direction, with a surface area of 24 km^{2} (9.3 sq mi). It has a maximum depth of 151 m (495 ft).

The three main tributaries of the lake are the Seez, Murgbach and Linth. The latter continues its course from Walensee to Obersee (Lake Zurich) through the Linth canal. Until the regulation of the Linth during the early 19th century, the Linth bypassed Walensee west of it and the lake's outflow was a river called the Maag, which merged with the Linth near Ziegelbrücke. The Seerenbach Falls and Rinquelle are adjacent to the north of the lake. The Schnittlauchinsel, near the eastern end of the lake, is the only island in the Walensee.

The Churfirsten range with its seven peaks raises steeply on the north side from the lake's level at 419 m (1,375 ft) to 2,306 m (7,566 ft) above sea level, joining the Leistchamm (2,101 m / 6,893 ft), Mattstock (1,936 m / 6,352 ft) and Federispitz (1,865 m / 6,119 ft) to the west. The Paxmal, near Walenstadt, overlooks the lake. On the south, the lake is overlooked by the Mürtschenstock Massif, whose highest peak is 2,441 metres (8,009 ft) above sea level, Hochmättli (2,252 m / 7,388 ft), Magerrain (2,524 m / 8,281 ft), and the resort area Flumserberg. The highest point of the lake's drainage basin is the Tödi (3,614 m / 11,857 ft).

The northern coast of Walensee is sometimes nicknamed "the riviera" due to its mild climate. Because of the mild climate, palm trees, kiwifruit and vineyards are grown in Quinten.

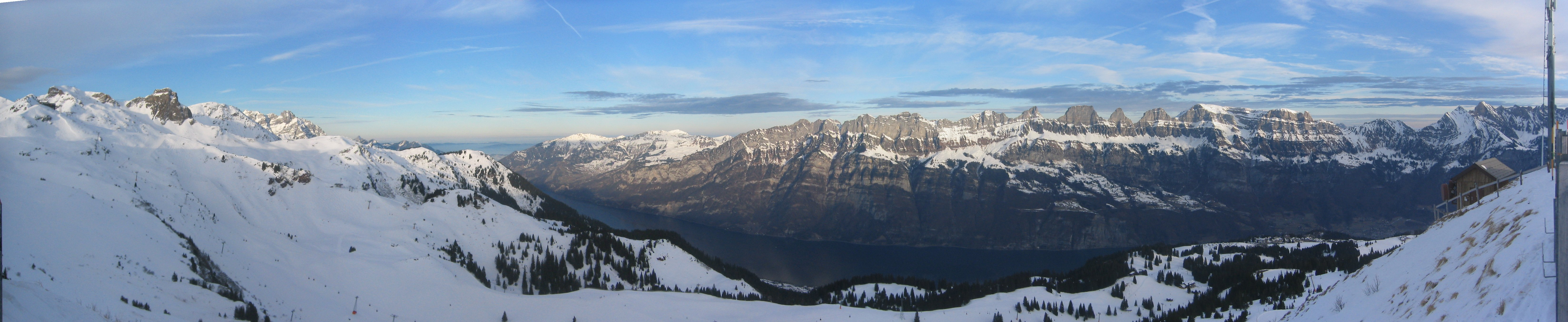
As seen from the Flumserberg

== Settlements and transportation ==
Apart from Walenstadt at the eastern end of the lake, other lakeside towns and villages are Weesen at the western end of the lake and Mühlehorn and Mols, Murg and Unterterzen south of the lake. Quinten, located on the northern shore of the lake, can only be reached on foot from Weesen or Walenstadt via a hiking trail or by boat (e.g. via a ferry from Murg) as there are no roads. Commercial passenger boats are operated by Walensee-Schifffahrt. At Betlis (Weesen), there is a chapel.

To the south, the lake is followed by the A3 motorway and the Ziegelbrücke–Sargans railway line, with stations at Mühlehorn, Murg, Unterterzen and Walenstadt. Unterterzen railway station is connected via a gondola lift with Oberterzen and the resort area Flumserberg. There is also a continuous bike route (Route 9) along the southern shore, featuring a section through tunnels (former railway tunnels) at Kerenzerberg.

== Arts ==
The lake provided the inspiration for a solo piano piece by Hungarian Romantic composer Franz Liszt, Au lac de Wallenstadt. The piece is part of a collection of solo piano works inspired by his travels to Switzerland in the 1830s.

== Gallery ==
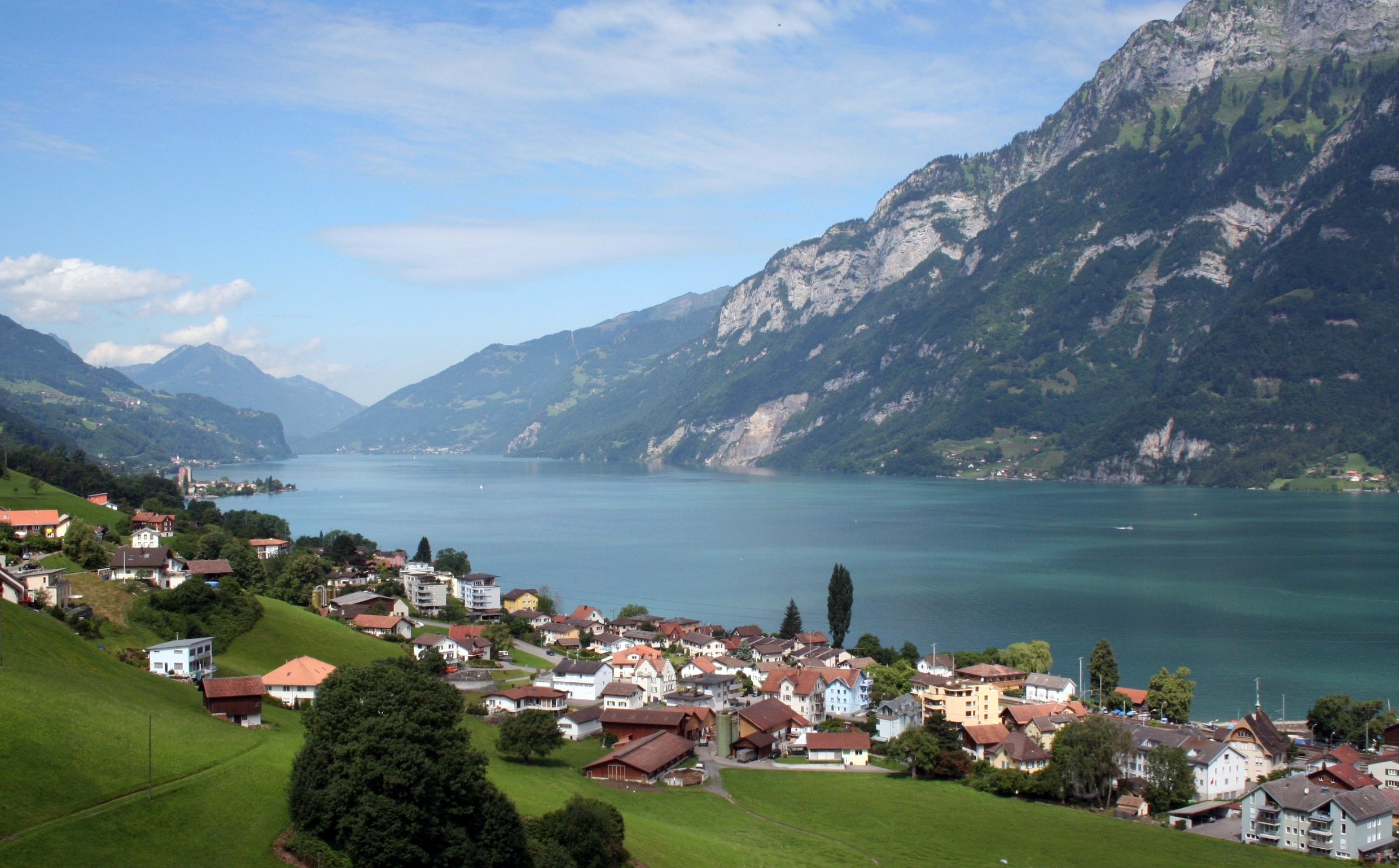
Walensee and Unterterzen, Quarten

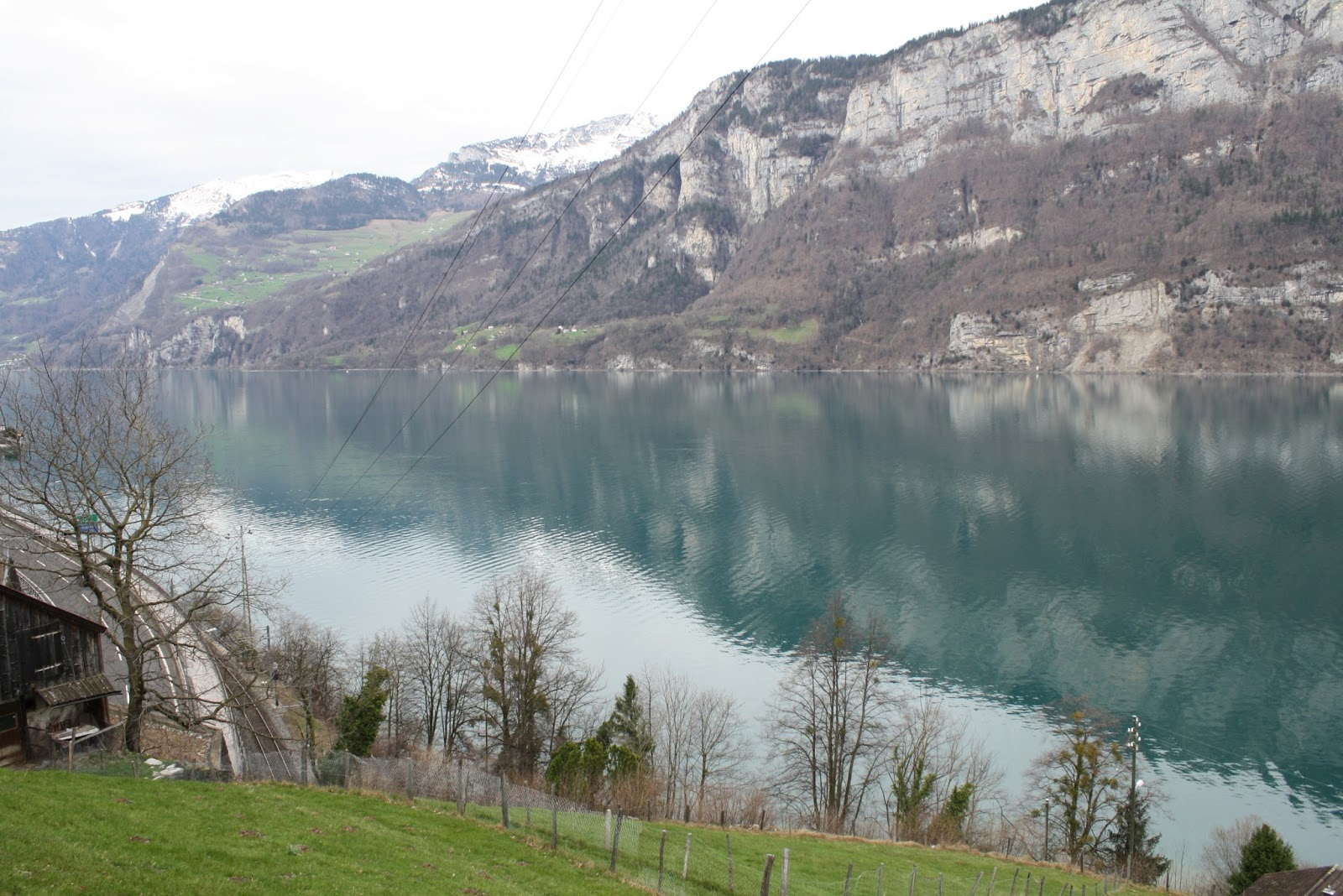
Looking to the west towards Amden

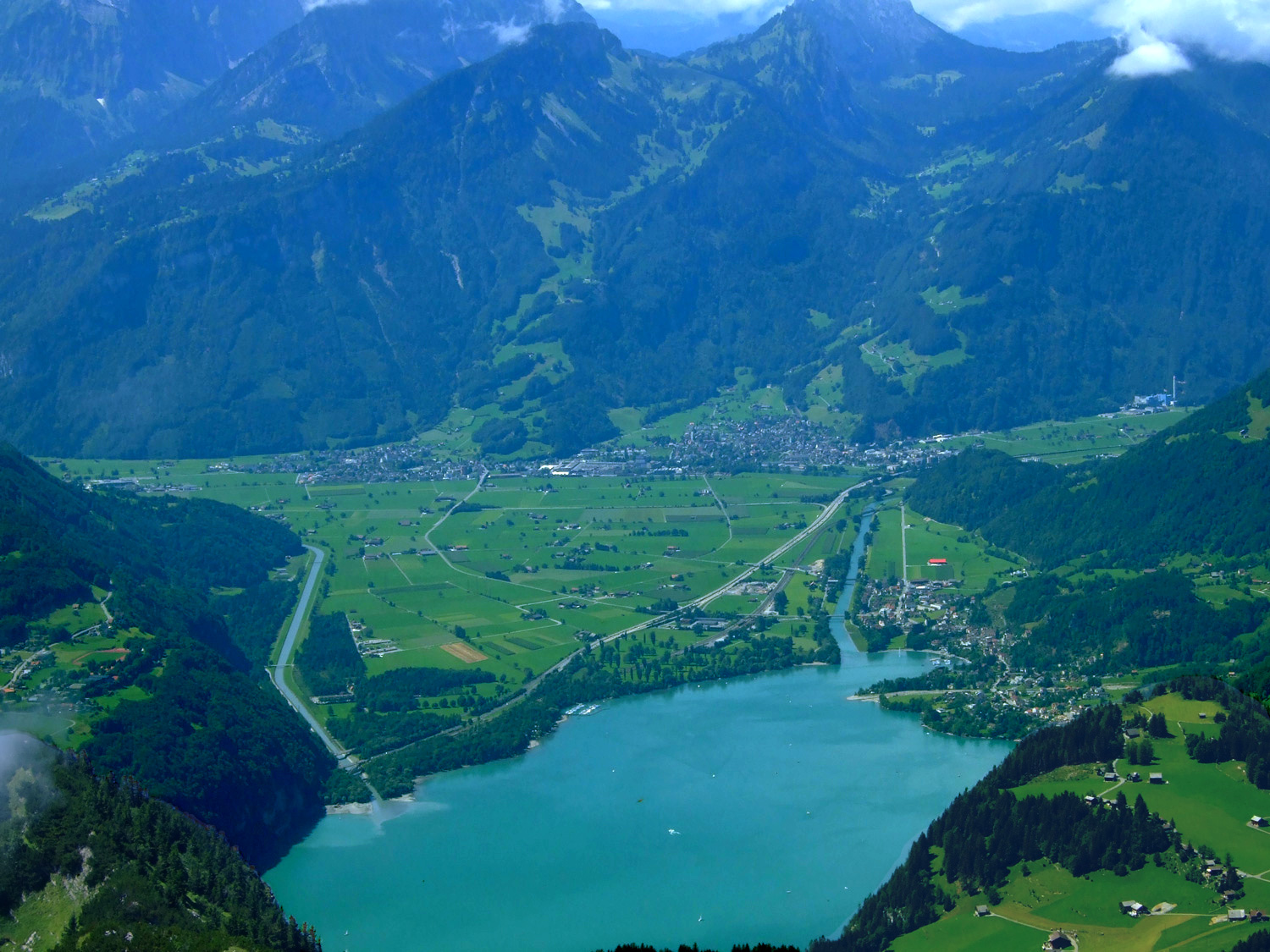
Escher canal (left), diverting the river Linth into Walensee, and the Linth canal (right), the present-day outflow of the lake

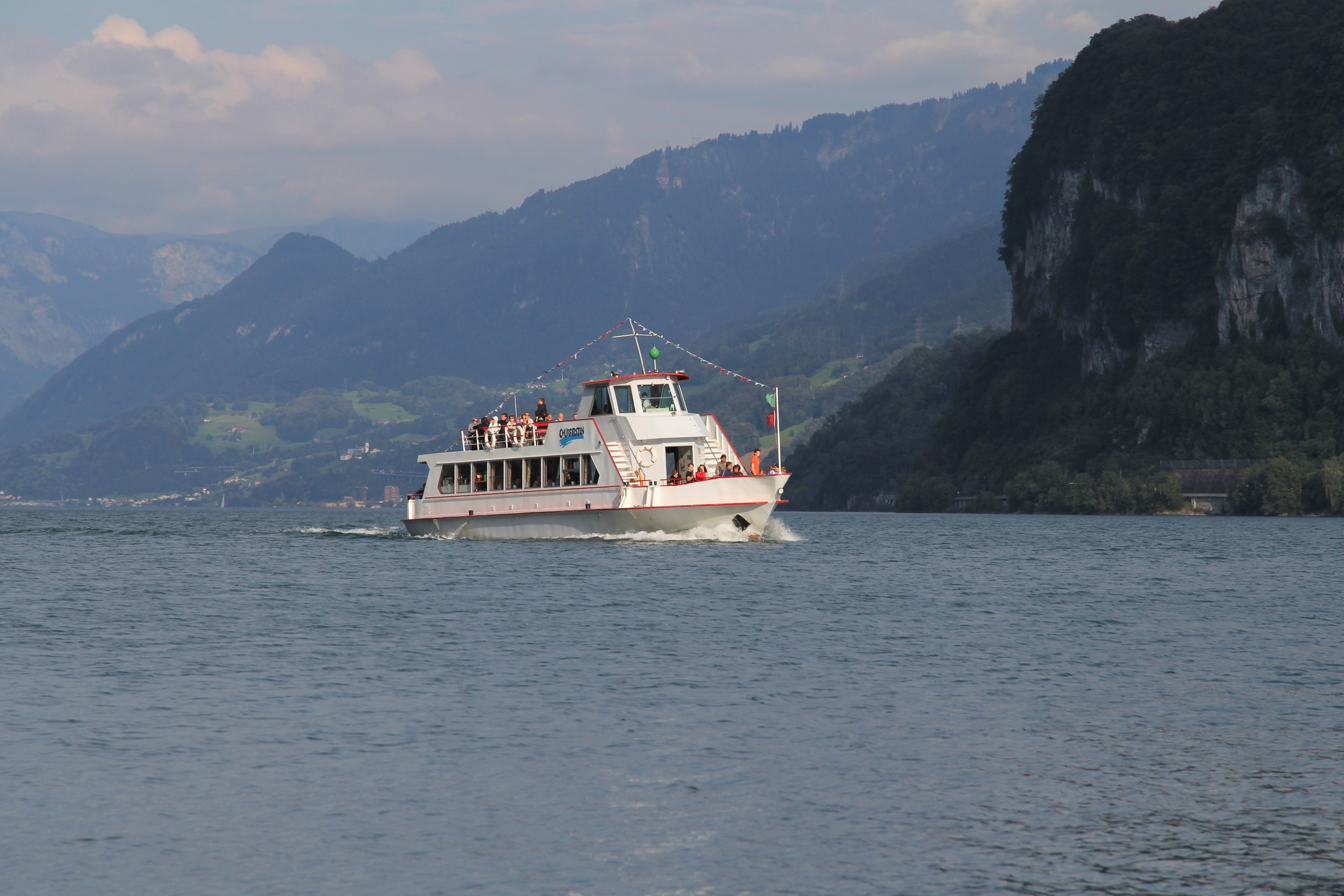
Commercial passenger boat

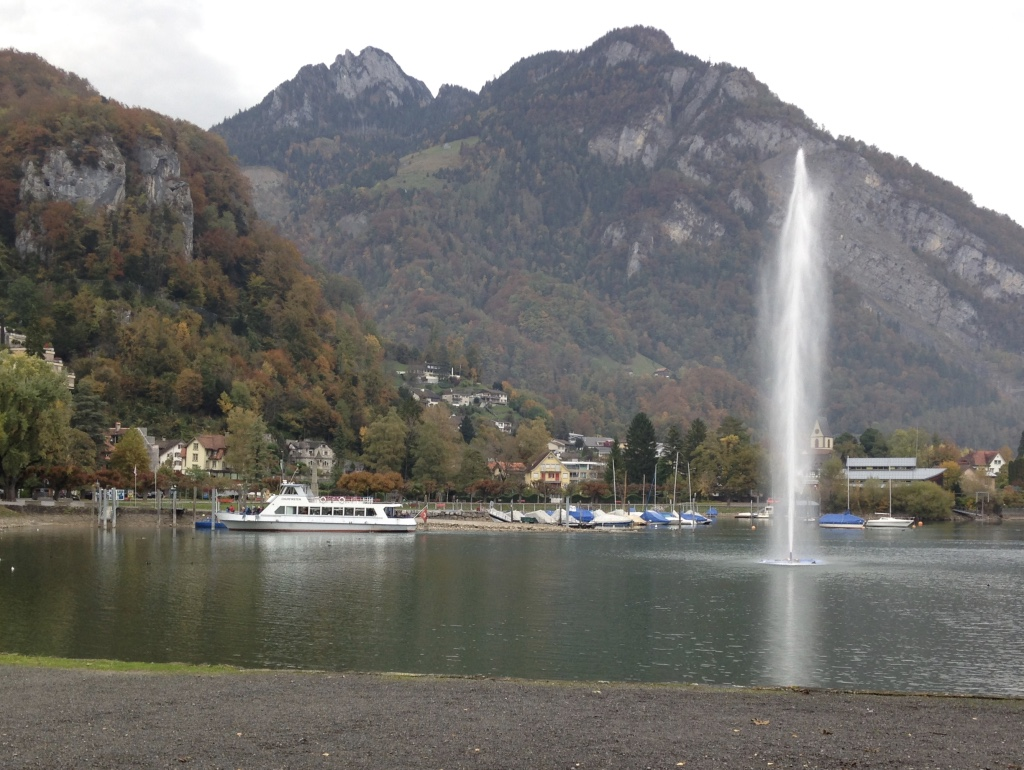
Weesen harbour

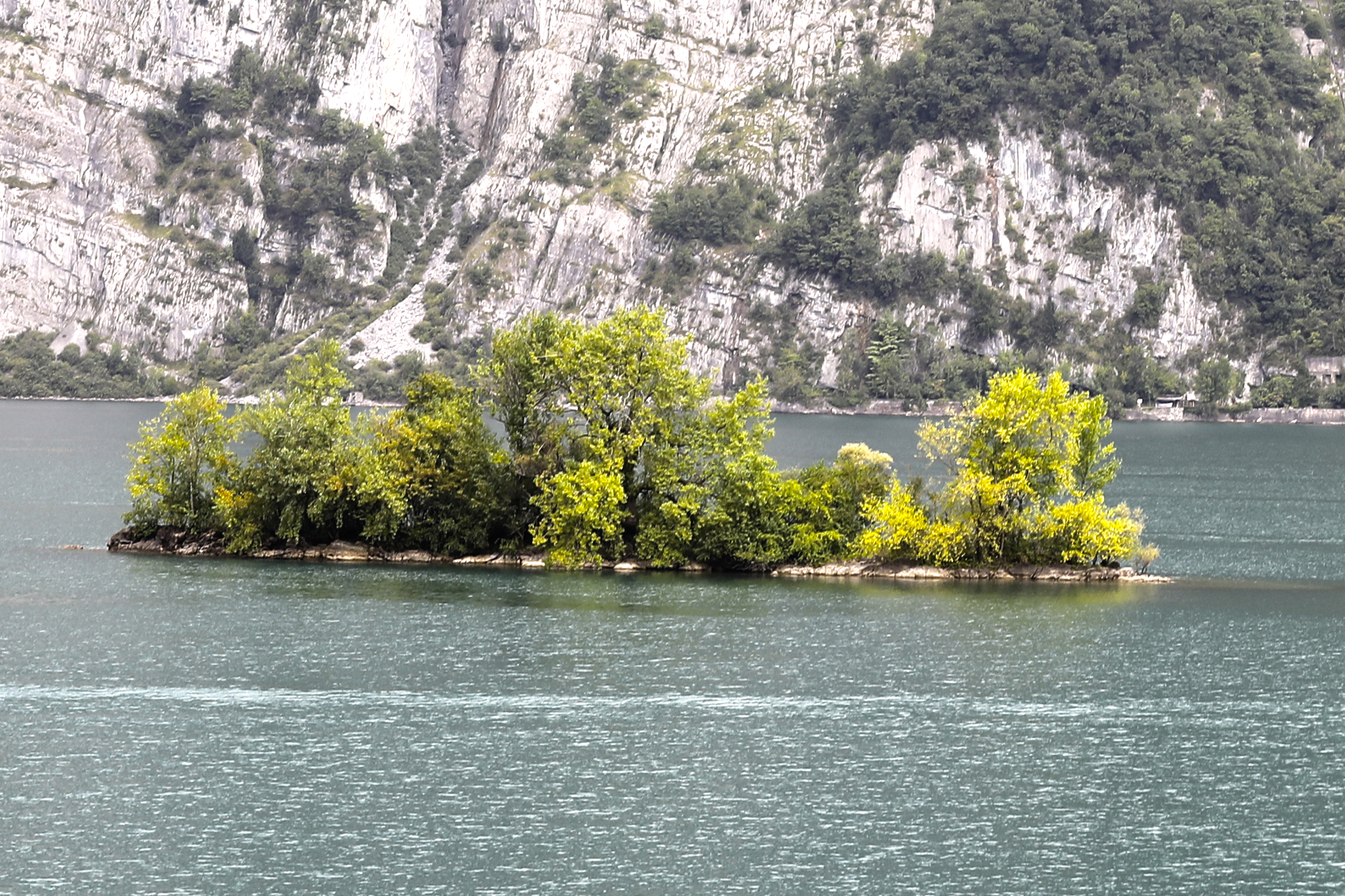
Schnittlauchinsel

== See also ==
- List of lakes in Switzerland
