= Merlischachen =

Merlischachen may refer to:

- Merlischachen railway station, a railway station on the Lucerne–Immensee railway line in Switzerland
- Merlischachen (village), one of three villages in Küssnacht, Switzerland
