= Meggen Zentrum railway station =

Railway station in Switzerland

Meggen Zentrum
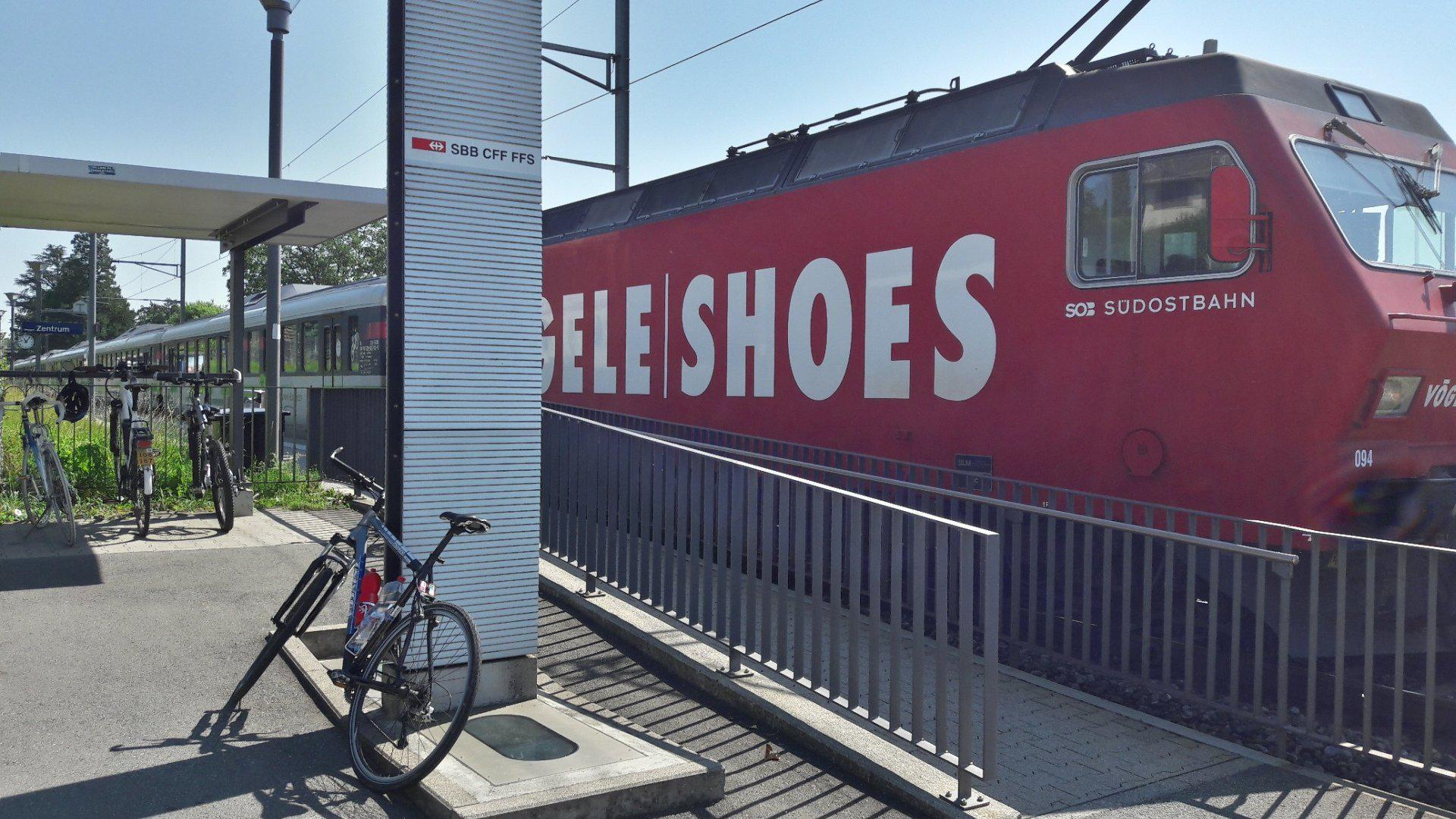
- Voralpen Express at the station in 2018

General information
- Location: Meggen; Switzerland
- Coordinates: 47°02′42″N 8°22′27″E
- Elevation: 469 m (1,539 ft)
- Owner: Swiss Federal Railways
- Line: Lucerne–Immensee line
- Distance: 9.9 km (6.2 mi) from Lucerne
- Train operators: Swiss Federal Railways; Südostbahn
- Connections: Lake Lucerne Navigation Company ferries

Other information
- Fare zone: 10 (Passepartout)

History
- Electrified: The Meggen Zentrum railway station is located in the municipality of Meggen, in the canton of Lucerne, Switzerland. It was opened in 2006 to provide better access to the railway network for residents, as the original Meggen station (opened in 1897) is located further from the town center.

Passengers
- 2018: 390 per weekday

Services
Preceding station	Südostbahn	Following station
Lucerne Verkehrshaus towards Lucerne	Voralpen Express	Küssnacht am Rigi towards St. Gallen
Preceding station	Lucerne S-Bahn	Following station
Luzern Verkehrshaus towards Lucerne	S3	Meggen towards Brunnen
Location

Meggen Zentrum railway station (German: Bahnhof Meggen Zentrum) is a railway station in the municipality of Meggen, in the Swiss canton of Lucerne. It is an intermediate stop on the standard gauge Lucerne–Immensee line of Swiss Federal Railways.

== Services ==
As of the December 2020 timetable change, the following services stop at Meggen Zentrum:

- IR Voralpen-Express: hourly service between Lucerne and St. Gallen.
- Lucerne S-Bahn S3: hourly service between Lucerne and Brunnen.
