= Küssnacht am Rigi railway station =

Railway station in Switzerland

Küssnacht am Rigi
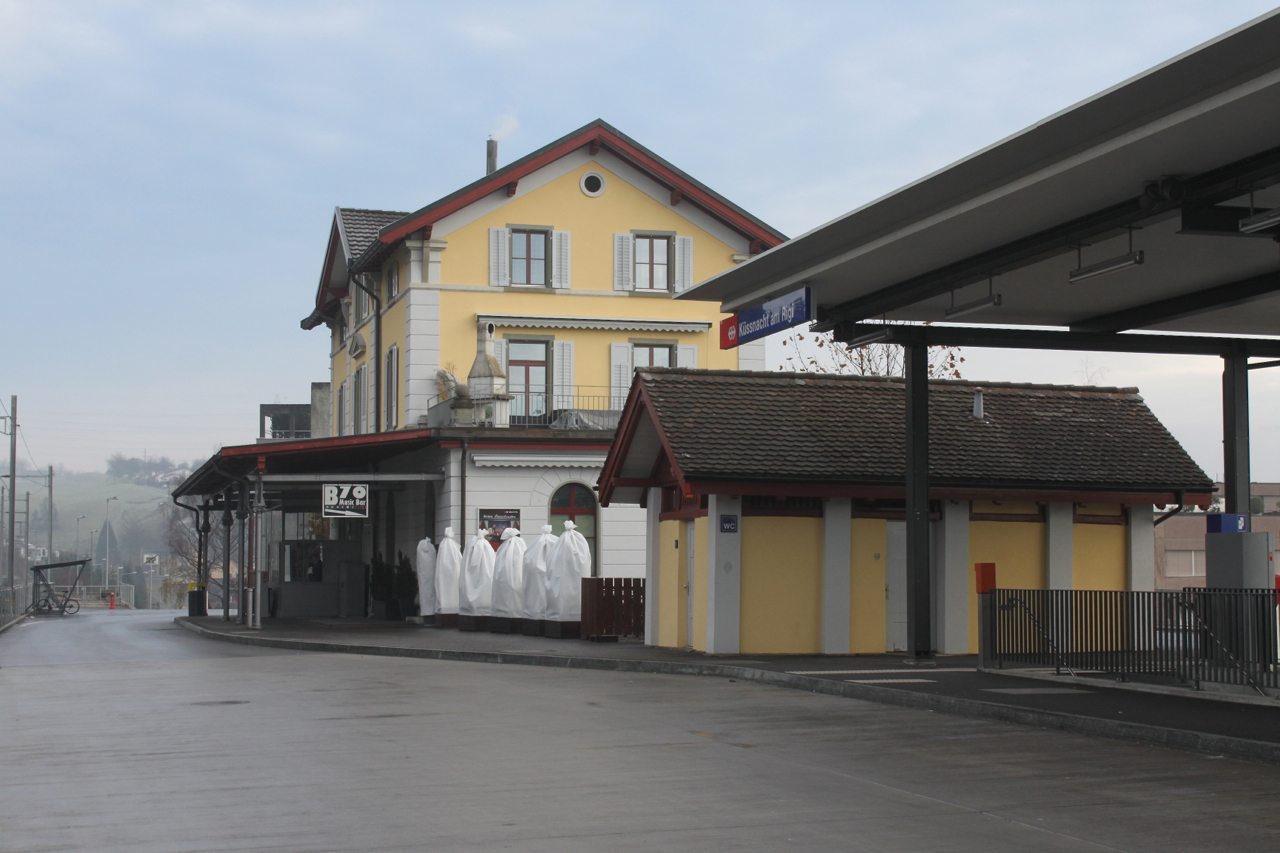
- The station building in 2013

General information
- Location: Küssnacht; Switzerland
- Coordinates: 47°05′01″N 8°26′01″E
- Elevation: 457 m (1,499 ft)
- Owner: Swiss Federal Railways
- Line: Lucerne–Immensee line
- Distance: 16.2 km (10.1 mi) from Lucerne
- Train operators: Swiss Federal Railways; Südostbahn
- Connections: Zugerland Verkehrsbetriebe buses

Other information
- Fare zone: 29 (Passepartout); 676 (Tarifverbund Schwyz)

Passengers
- 2018: 2,400 per weekday

Services
Preceding station	Südostbahn	Following station
Meggen Zentrum towards Lucerne	Voralpen Express	Arth-Goldau towards St. Gallen
Preceding station	Lucerne S-Bahn	Following station
Merlischachen towards Lucerne	S3	Immensee towards Brunnen
Location

Küssnacht am Rigi railway station (German: Bahnhof Küssnacht am Rigi) is a railway station in the municipality of Küssnacht, in the Swiss canton of Schwyz. It is an intermediate stop on the standard gauge Lucerne–Immensee line of Swiss Federal Railways.

It lies within walking distance (ca. 1 km (0.62 mi)) to the landing site of Lake Lucerne Navigation Company.

== Services ==
As of the December 2020 timetable change, the following services stop at Küssnacht am Rigi:

- IR Voralpen-Express: hourly service between Lucerne and St. Gallen.
- Lucerne S-Bahn S3: hourly service between Lucerne and Brunnen.

== See also ==
- Rail transport in Switzerland
