= Meggen railway station =

Railway station in Switzerland

Meggen
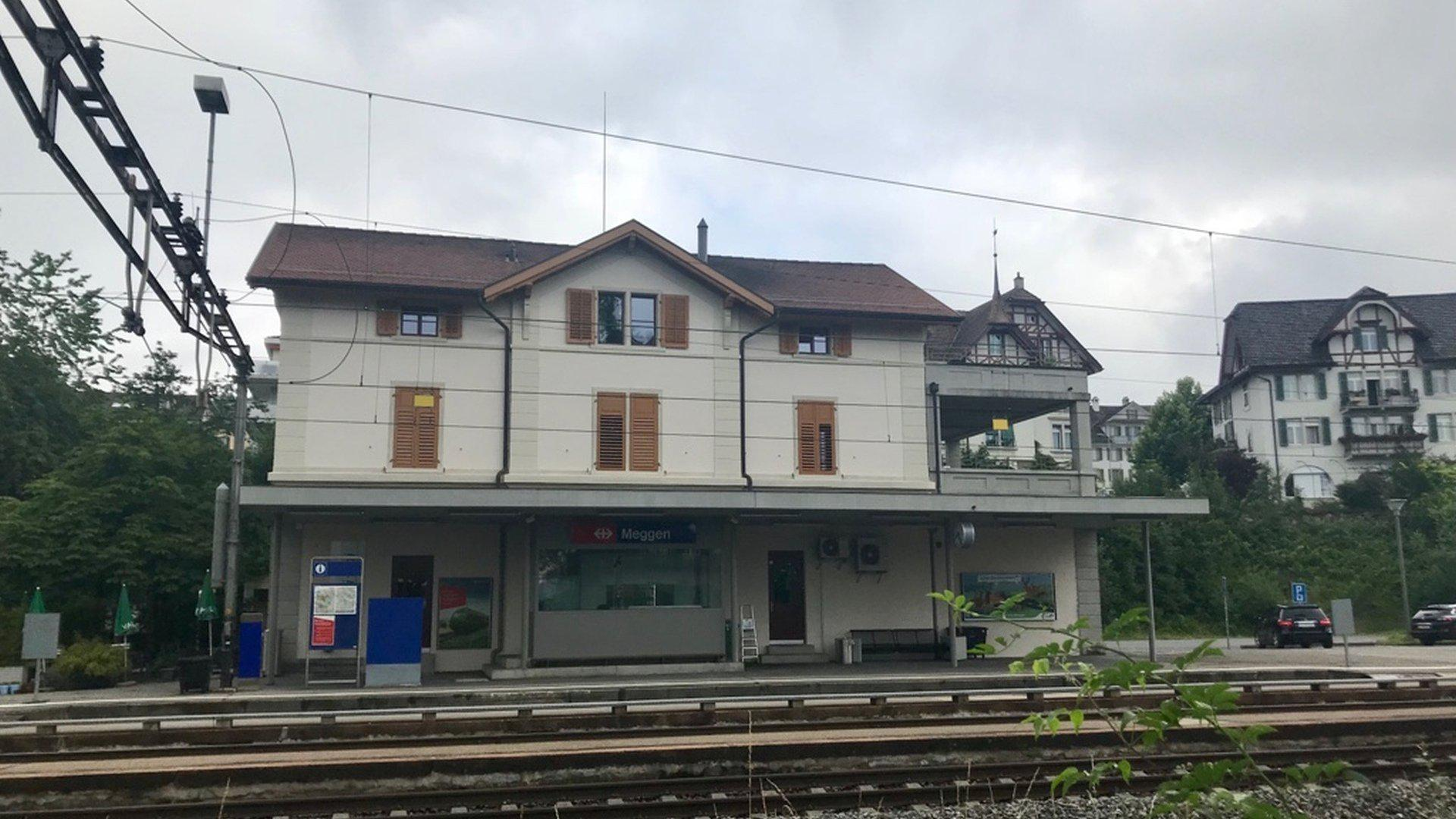
- The station in 2018

General information
- Location: Meggen; Switzerland
- Coordinates: 47°03′01″N 8°22′59″E
- Elevation: 472 m (1,549 ft)
- Owner: Swiss Federal Railways
- Line: Lucerne–Immensee line
- Distance: 10.7 km (6.6 mi) from Lucerne
- Train operators: Swiss Federal Railways

Other information
- Fare zone: 10 (Passepartout)

History
- Electrified: Meggen railway station was opened in 1897 as part of the construction of the Luzern–Immensee railway line. This line served as a feeder to the Gotthard railway, connecting Lucerne directly with Immensee, a key junction at the northern entrance to the Gotthard route. Originally, the station featured two island platforms served by two main through tracks and an additional stub track. There was also a siding track leading to a nearby factory located to the northeast of the station, which was used for industrial freight purposes.

Passengers
- 2018: 110 per weekday

Services
Preceding station	Lucerne S-Bahn	Following station
Meggen Zentrum towards Lucerne	S3	Merlischachen towards Brunnen
Location

Meggen railway station (German: Bahnhof Meggen) is a railway station in the municipality of Meggen, in the Swiss canton of Lucerne. It is an intermediate stop on the standard gauge Lucerne–Immensee line of Swiss Federal Railways.

== Services ==
As of the December 2020 timetable change, the following services stop at Meggen:

- Lucerne S-Bahn S3: hourly service between Lucerne and Brunnen.
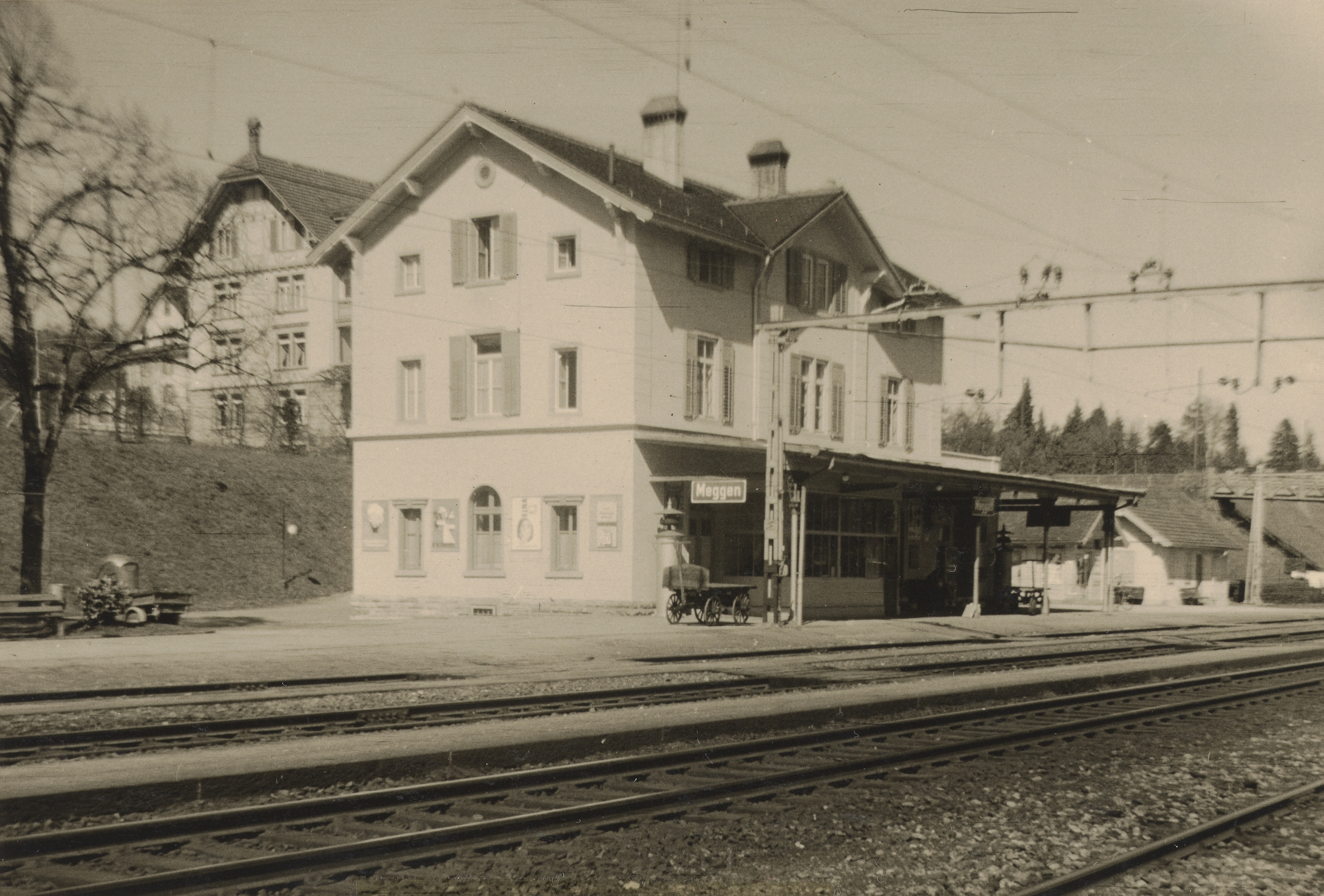
station building, ca. 1950

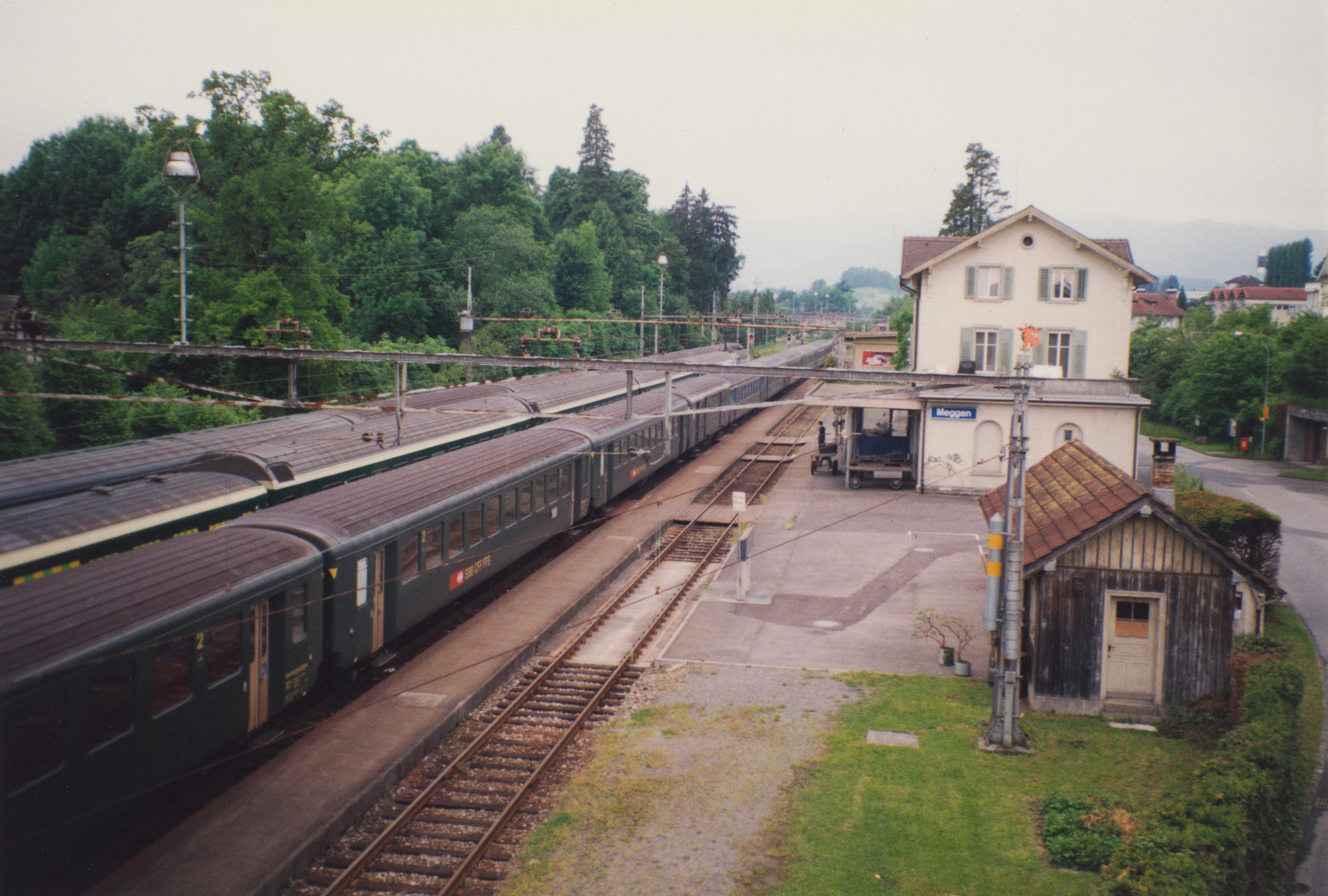
station, from overpass, 1997

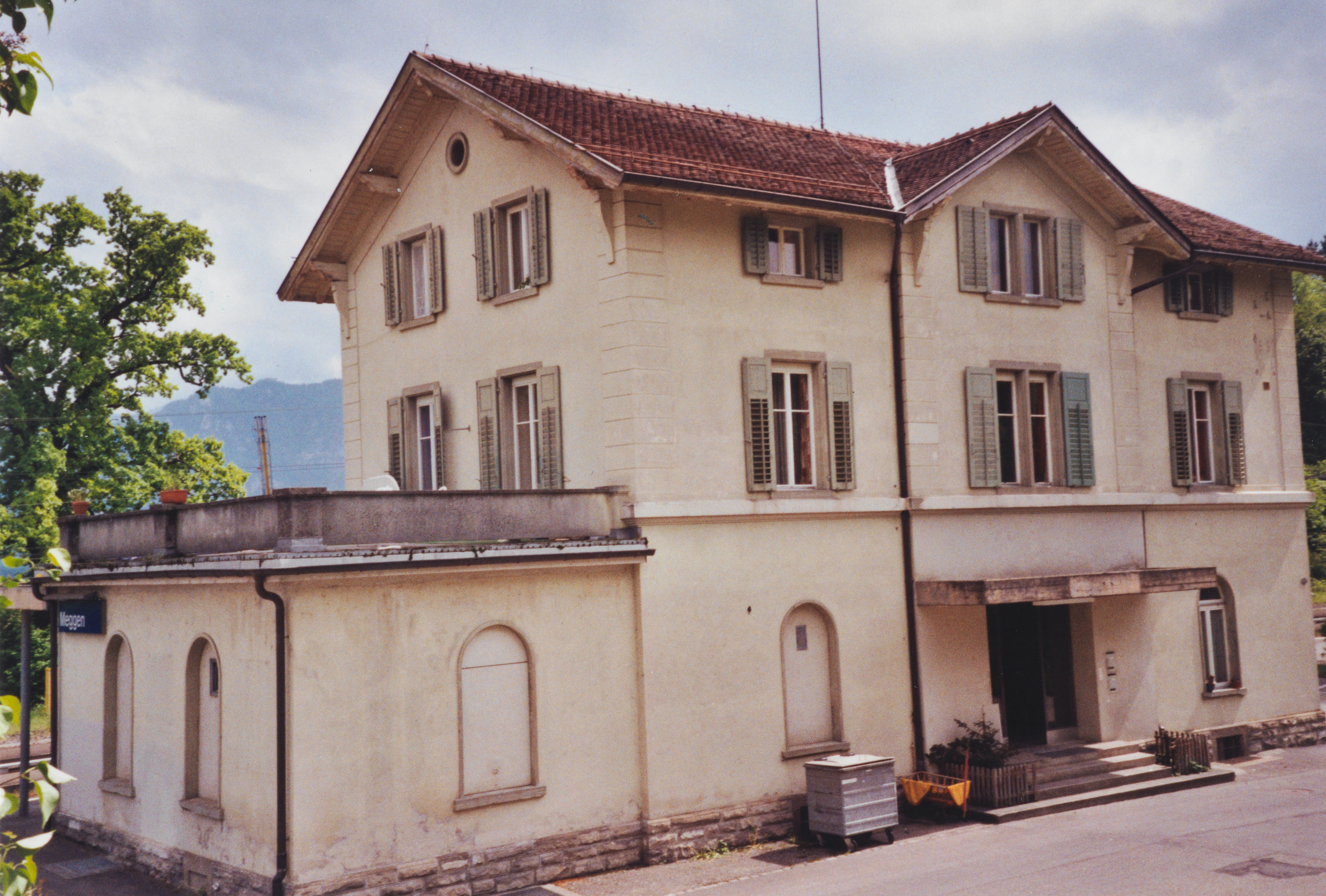
station building, streetside, 2003

== History and Situation ==
The Meggen station was inaugurated in 1897 with the commissioning of the Lucerne - Immensee line, which connected Lucerne to the Immensee - Chiasso line, better known as the Gotthard line.

It is located in the center of the urban area of Meggen. It has two central platforms accessed by two through tracks and one dead-end track, as well as a branch to a factory in the northeast of the station. Since 2006, there has been a new station in the locality, Meggen Zentrum, which has a more central location.

In railway terms, the station is situated on the Lucerne - Immensee line. Its adjacent railway facilities are the Meggen Zentrum station towards Lucerne and the Merlischachen station towards Immensee.
