= Greppen =

- Municipality
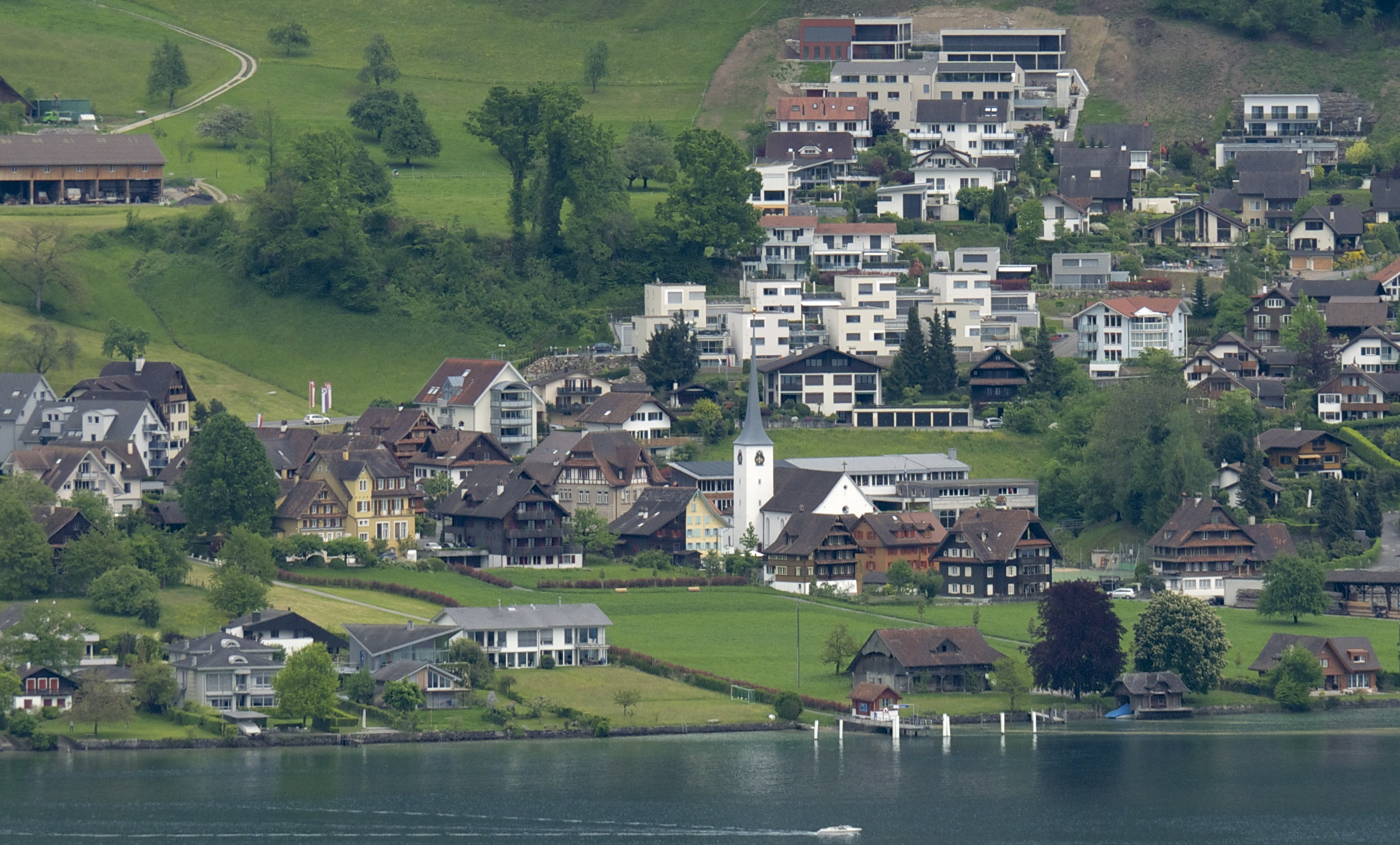

- Coat of arms
- Location of Greppen
- Location within Switzerland Location within Canton of Lucerne
- Coordinates: 47°03′N 08°26′E
- Country: Switzerland
- Canton: Lucerne
- District: Lucerne

Area
  - Total: 5.25 km^{2} (2.03 sq mi)
- Elevation: 447 m (1,467 ft)

Population (December 2020)
  - Total: 1,185
  - Density: 226/km^{2} (585/sq mi)
- Time zone: UTC+01:00 (CET)
  - Summer (DST): UTC+02:00 (CEST)
- Postal code: 6404
- SFOS number: 1056
- ISO 3166 code: CH-LU
- Surrounded by: Küssnacht (SZ), Meggen, Weggis
- Website: www.greppen.ch

Greppen is a municipality in the district of Lucerne in the canton of Lucerne in Switzerland.

It lies at the base of huge Mount Rigi. The exclave is separated by Lake Lucerne from the rest of the district.

== History ==
Greppen shares the history of its neighboring community of Weggis. Mentioned for the first time, albeit indirectly, in 1259 as Crepon, in a document of Heinrich von Heidegg, it belonged to the Habsburgs, and was sold to Lucerne in 1406 as part of the Vogti Neuhabsburg. In 1803 it was assigned to the District of Lucerne.

== Geography ==
Aerial view (1947)

Greppen lies on the eastern shore of the Küssnacht arm of Lake Lucerne, at the base of Mount Rigi. Greppen stretches from Lake Lucerne up the west slope of Mount Rigi to just below Rigi-Staffel (elev. 1,400 m (4,600 ft)). The Breitenacherreid is a nature preserve.

Greppen has an area of 3.3 km^{2} (1.3 sq mi). Of this area, 50.9% is used for agricultural purposes, while 39.7% is forested. The rest of the land, (9.4%) is settled. In the 1997 land survey, 39.7% of the total land area was forested. Of the agricultural land, 43.94% is used for farming or pastures, while 6.97% is used for orchards or vine crops. Of the settled areas, 7.88% is covered with buildings, 0.3% is industrial, and 1.21% is transportation infrastructure.

== Neighboring Municipalities ==
Greppen borders on Weggis and Küssnacht in Canton Schwyz. It also shares a water border with Meggen.

== Population ==
=== Population Growth ===
In 1798 there were only 240 inhabitants. The population grew until 1860 (1798-1860: +23.8%) and then fell to only by 244 by 1900. In the next twenty years, tourism brought with it rapid population growth (1900-1920: +51.8%). The number of inhabitants then remained about the same until 1980. Since then, the population has grown (1980-2004: +143.8%) because of improved transportation, the municipality's mild climate, and its proximity to Lucerne and Küssnacht. Over the last 10 years the population has grown at a rate of 28.2%.

The historical population is given in the following table:

Population Growth
Year	Population
1456	c. 70
1695	c. 200
1798	240
1850	287
1860	297
1880	244
1900	228
1910	281
1920	346
1950	349
1980	349
1990	567
2000	770
2004	879

=== Languages ===
As of 2000, 94.03% of the population speaks German, 1.3% speak English, and 0.91% speak French.

=== Religions-Denominations ===
The population is traditionally Catholic. In the 2000 census, 65.97% were Roman Catholic, 19.87% were Protestant, 1.04% were Orthodox Christians, and 0.52% were Old Catholic. Nonchristian minorities included Atheists (8.44%), Muslims (1.3%) and (2.47%) who did not answer the question.

=== Origin and Nationality ===
In 2000, 90.39% of the population were Swiss citizens, of whom only 85.84% had passports. Immigrant groups included Germans (4.03%, or 4.68%, including those with dual citizenship), and Italians (0.65%, or 1.95%). Smaller immigrant groups were from France, Austria, Slovakia, Serbia and Montenegro and Macedonia. Greppen has a population (as of 31 December 2020) of 1,185. As of 2007, 10.9% of the population was made up of foreign nationals.

=== Age profile ===
The age distribution in Greppen is; 246 people or 26.1% of the population is 0–19 years old. 237 people or 25.2% are 20–39 years old, and 367 people or 39% are 40–64 years old. The senior population distribution is 74 people or 7.9% are 65–79 years old, 14 or 1.5% are 80–89 years old and 3 people or 0.3% of the population are 90+ years old.

=== Households ===
As of 2000 there are 293 households, of which 82 households (or about 28.0%) contain only a single individual. 30 or about 10.2% are large households, with at least five members. As of 2000 there were 184 inhabited buildings in the municipality, of which 144 were built only as housing, and 40 were mixed use buildings. There were 97 single family homes, 27 double family homes, and 20 multi-family homes in the municipality. Most homes were either two (70) or three (52) story structures. There were only 5 single story buildings and 17 four or more story buildings.

== Municipal Council ==
The non-professional Municipal Council is formed of the following:

- Marc Schnyder (Municipal President; Culture, Leisure, Economy)
- Kurt Greter (Mayor; Real estate, Safety, Education, Traffic and Finance)
- Roswitha Jenni (Social welfare)

=== Elections ===
In the canton-level elections of 2003, the civil parties won the following portions of the votes: CVP 33.16%, FDP 27.59%, SVP 19.07%. The leftist and progressive parties (SP and Green Alliance) won large portions of the votes, 9.48% and 8.25%, respectively, considering that Greppen is a rural municipality in the Lucerne District. Among the smallest parties, the Aktiven Senioren (Active Seniors) did the best, with 1.27%.

In the 2007 election the most popular party was the SVP which received 29.4% of the vote. The next three most popular parties were the CVP (26.5%), the FDP (23%) and the SPS (10.1%).

=== "Fusion" Project ===
The three municipalities near Mount Rigi in the District of Lucerne are planning a gradual union, because they already work together on many issues.

== Economy ==
The population of Greppen find their livelihood in many diverse fields. Although traditionally dominated by cattle and alpine dairy farming, and fishing, people also raised Chestnuts (in the mild climate) and mined Tuff. The widely used silk and linen weaving factories of the 19th century have disappeared. Major employers include culinary operations, (moderate) tourism, pharmaceuticals, and construction. The commuter balance paints a clear picture. 40 people commute to Greppen, whereas 280 (among a total of 421 employed) commute from Greppen (26.8% to Canton Schwyz, 20.7% to Canton Zug, 12.9% to Lucerne, and 11.4% to the neighboring municipality of Weggis).

Greppen has an unemployment rate of 1.36%. As of 2005, there were 47 people employed in the primary economic sector and about 17 businesses involved in this sector. 35 people are employed in the secondary sector and there are 13 businesses in this sector. 69 people are employed in the tertiary sector, with 31 businesses in this sector. As of 2000 54.7% of the population of the municipality were employed in some capacity. At the same time, females made up 41.3% of the workforce.

=== Tourism ===
Because of such diverse projects as the alignment of the Zürichsee-Gotthard railroad track along Mount Rigi, and the failure to construct a railroad up Mount Rigi departing from Greppen, tourism is not as important in Greppen as it is in nearby municipalities. Two restaurants of renown in Greppen are the Eidgenossen and St. Wendelin/Fische.

== Transportation ==
Greppen has possessed a ship dock of the Schifffahrtsgesellschaft des Vierwaldstättersees (SGV or Ship company of Lake Lucerne) since 1869. This company also set up a bus line from Küssnacht to Brunnen via Weggis in 1932, which is important to local public transportation. The nearest train station is in Küssnacht, on the track from Lucerne to Goldau. There is also a train station in Brunnen, which is on the Gotthard line.

The nearest autobahn exchange, 5 km (3.1 mi) away in Küssnacht, has improved traffic and lead to a great increase in population.

== Schools ==
There has been a village primary school in Greppen since 1809, which is attended by students in Kindergarten through grade 6. There are 8 students in Kindergarten and 84 students in the elementary grades. Students in grades 7 and above attend school in neighboring Weggis. The principal is Ruth Steiert-Hurschler.

The entire Swiss population is generally well educated. In Greppen about 81.9% of the population (between age 25 and 64) have completed either non-mandatory upper secondary education or additional higher education (either university or a Fachhochschule).

== Attractions ==
In the 14th century the holy order of St. Wendelin was established, and a village chapel of St. Wendelin was built between 1483 and 1485. This church had to yield to the parish church of St. Wendelin in about 1645. There is an annual pilgrimage to Greppen on October 20. The relatively intact village quality of Greppen has put it on the Inventar schützenswerter Ortschaften, or the "Inventory of protected communities."
