= Merlischachen railway station =

Railway station in Switzerland

Merlischachen
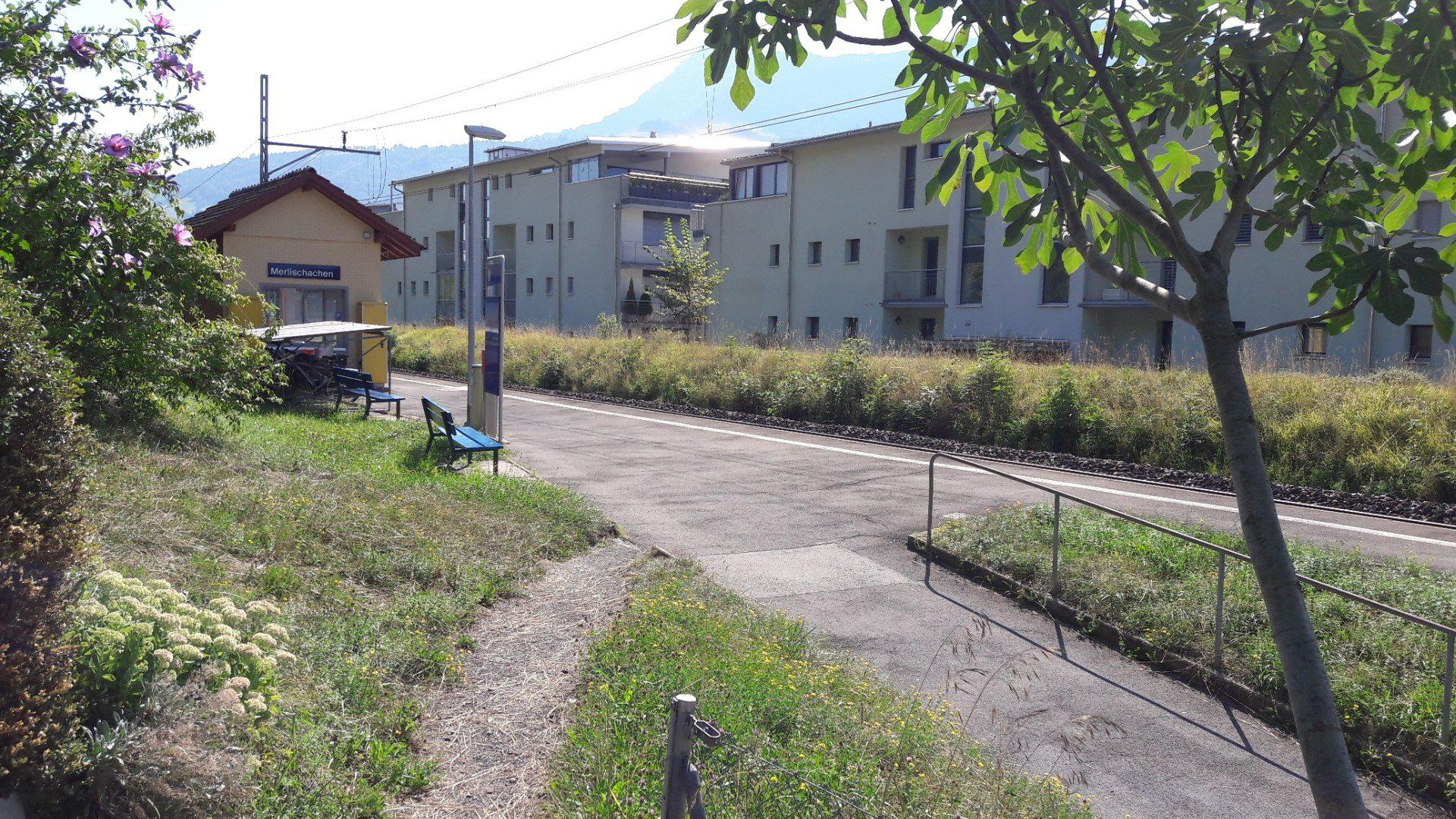
- The station in 2018

General information
- Location: Küssnacht; Switzerland
- Coordinates: 47°04′04″N 8°24′33″E
- Elevation: 465 m (1,526 ft)
- Owner: Swiss Federal Railways
- Line: Lucerne–Immensee line
- Distance: 13.6 km (8.5 mi) from Lucerne
- Train operators: Swiss Federal Railways

Other information
- Fare zone: 29 (Passepartout); 676 (Tarifverbund Schwyz)

Passengers
- 2018: 210 per weekday

Services
Preceding station	Lucerne S-Bahn	Following station
Meggen towards Lucerne	S3	Küssnacht am Rigi towards Brunnen
Location

Merlischachen railway station (German: Bahnhof Merlischachen) is a railway station in the municipality of Küssnacht, in the Swiss canton of Schwyz. It is an intermediate stop on the standard gauge Lucerne–Immensee railway line of Swiss Federal Railways.

== Services ==
As of the December 2020 timetable change, the following services stop at Merlischachen:

- Lucerne S-Bahn S3: hourly service between Lucerne and Brunnen.
