= Immensee railway station =

Railway station in Switzerland

Immensee
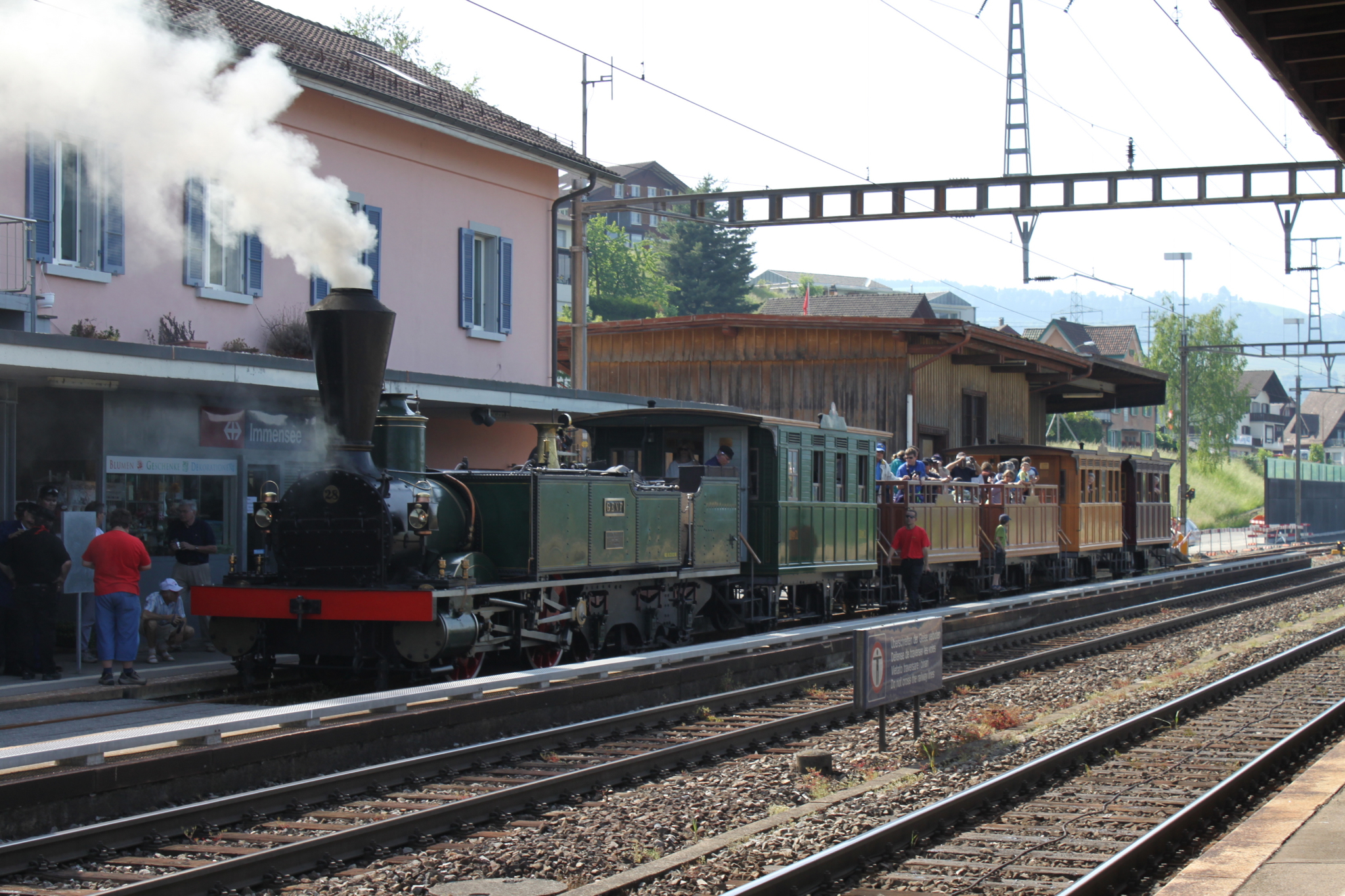
- Heritage steam locomotive at Immensee in 2009

General information
- Location: Küssnacht; Switzerland
- Coordinates: 47°05′30″N 8°27′46″E
- Elevation: 460 m (1,510 ft)
- Owner: Swiss Federal Railways
- Lines: Gotthard line; Lucerne–Immensee line; Rupperswil–Immensee line
- Distance: 19.2 km (11.9 mi) from Lucerne; 107.2 km (66.6 mi) from Basel SBB
- Platforms: 3
- Tracks: 4
- Train operators: Swiss Federal Railways
- Connections: Zugerland Verkehrsbetriebe buses

Other information
- Fare zone: 675 and 676 (Tarifverbund Schwyz)

History
- Former names: Immensee-Küssnacht

Passengers
- 2018: 610 per weekday

Services
| Preceding station | Lucerne S-Bahn | Following station |
|---|---|---|
| Küssnacht am Rigi towards Lucerne | S3 | Arth-Goldau towards Brunnen |
Location

Immensee railway station (German: Bahnhof Immensee) is a railway station in the municipality of Küssnacht, in the Swiss canton of Schwyz. It is located at the junction of three standard gauge lines of Swiss Federal Railways: the Gotthard, Lucerne–Immensee, and Rapperswil–Immensee.

== Layout ==
Immensee has three platforms serving four tracks, numbered 1–4. The platform nearest to the station building (Swiss Standard German: Hausperron) is 70 metres (230 ft) long. Next to that platform is a 119-metre (390 ft) intermediate platform (Swiss Standard German: Zwischenperron), serving one track. Finally, there is a 199-metre (653 ft) island platform serving two tracks.

== Services ==
As of the December 2020 timetable change, the following services stop at Immensee:

- Lucerne S-Bahn S3: hourly service between Luzern and Brunnen.
