= Klausjagen =

Annual Christmas Eve festival and parade in Küssnacht, Switzerland

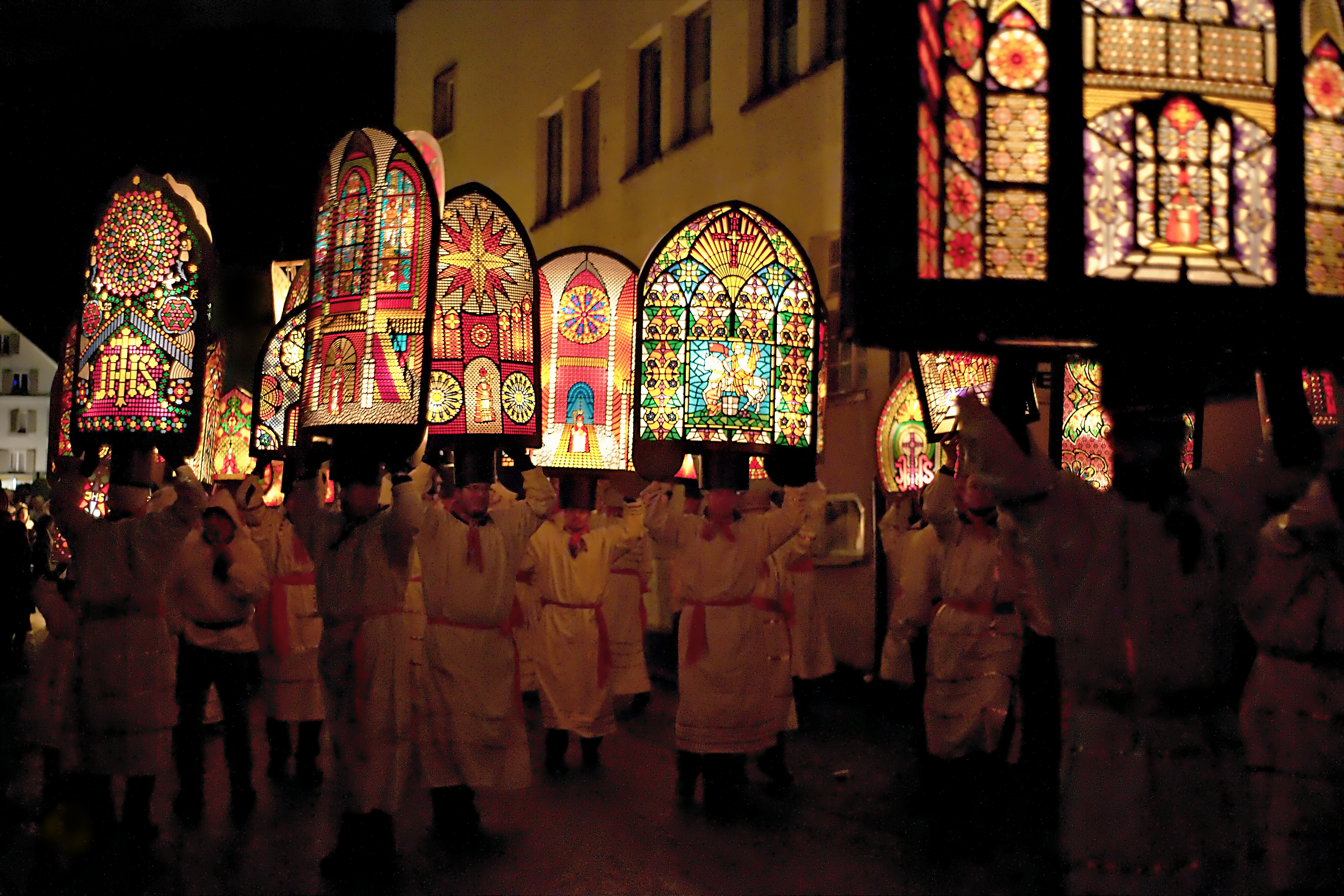
Klausjagen 2011

The Klausjagen ("Nicholas chase") festival takes place in the Swiss town of Küssnacht on the eve of Saint Nicholas Day. The festival, attended each year by about 20,000 people, consists of a parade of around 1,500 participants, and lasts far into the night.

== History ==
The procession is believed to have its roots in pre-Christian pagan traditions involving the chasing of wild spirits (compare Wild Hunt). The early forms of the Klausjagen involved much unruliness and noise, and were frowned upon by Church and authorities, and were officially outlawed in 1732, but could not be effectively suppressed. In the late 19th century, the custom was instead "Christianized" and bishop's mitres first appeared in the procession. In the 1920s, the still rather rough procession was tamed by a committee of villagers who created the modern, clearly organized parade. Since 1928, the St. Nicholas Society of Küssnacht has been responsible for the continuation of the custom.

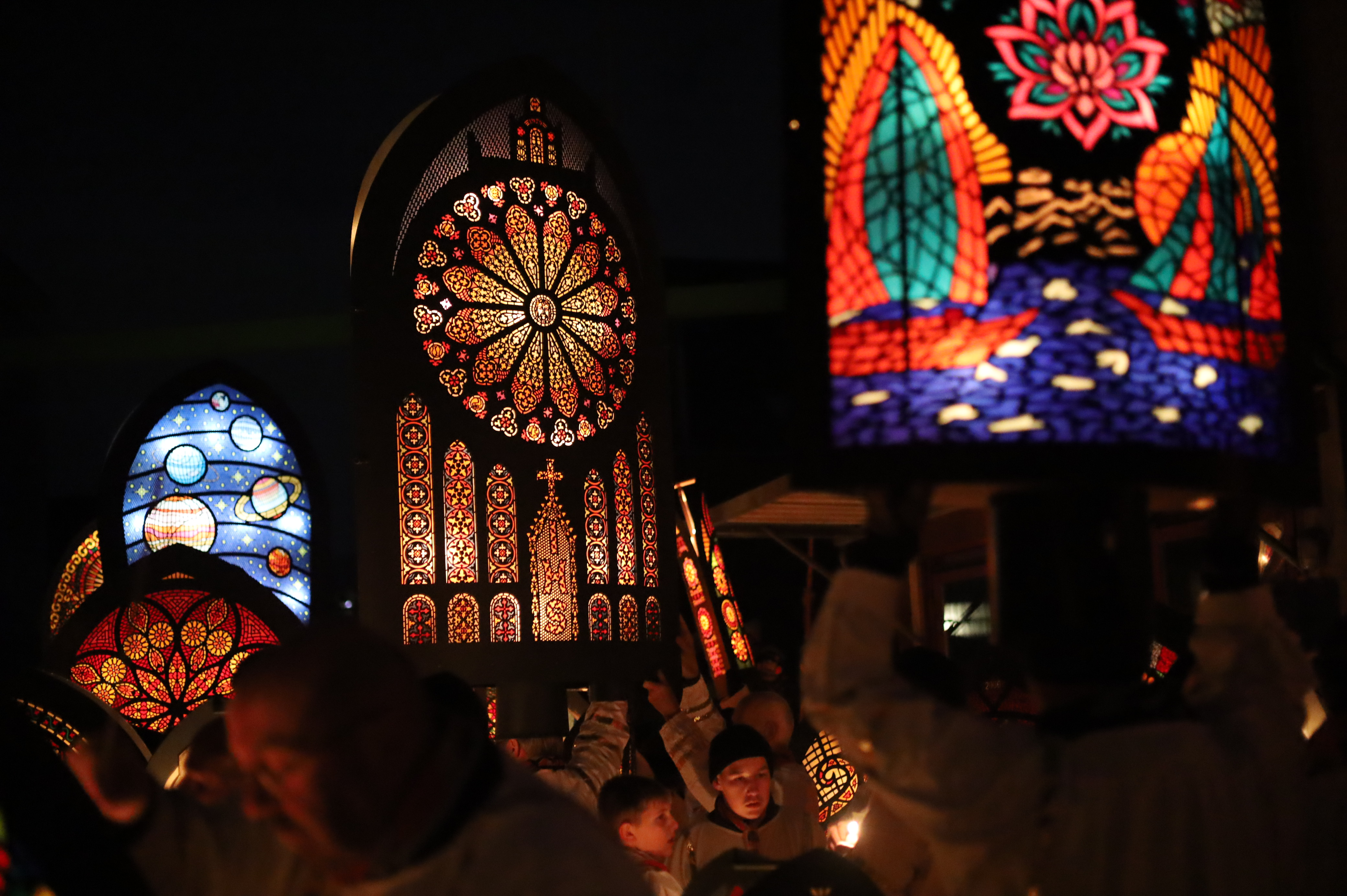
Preparation for the procession by the ifele

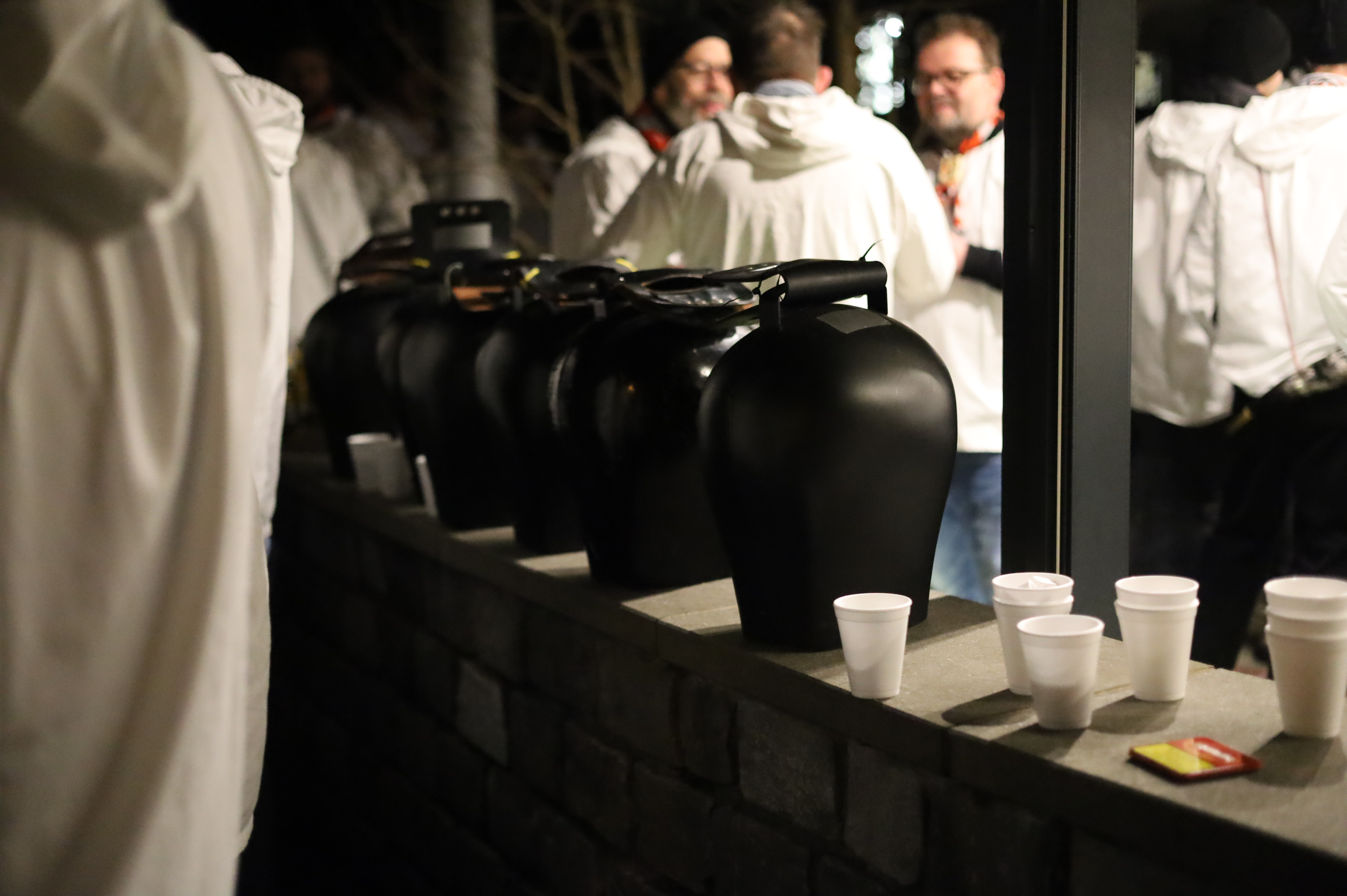
The bell used for the procession

The procession is organised in six stages. First come men cracking long two-handed sheep whips. Next come men wearing Iffelen or Infuln, which are enormous, incredibly ornate paper hats which resemble a cross between a bishop's mitre and a stained glass window, lit from the inside by candles, and as much as seven feet tall. Behind them is Saint Nicholas himself, with four attendants in black robes and hoods known as Schmutzlis, who hand out pastries. After them comes a brass band playing the traditional Klaus song, followed by a large group ringing trycheln, large bells which are descendants of cow bells. Lastly, the entire procession is followed by men blowing cow horns. Participants and watchers then generally head on to celebrations in local taverns.
