= Meggen =

- Municipality
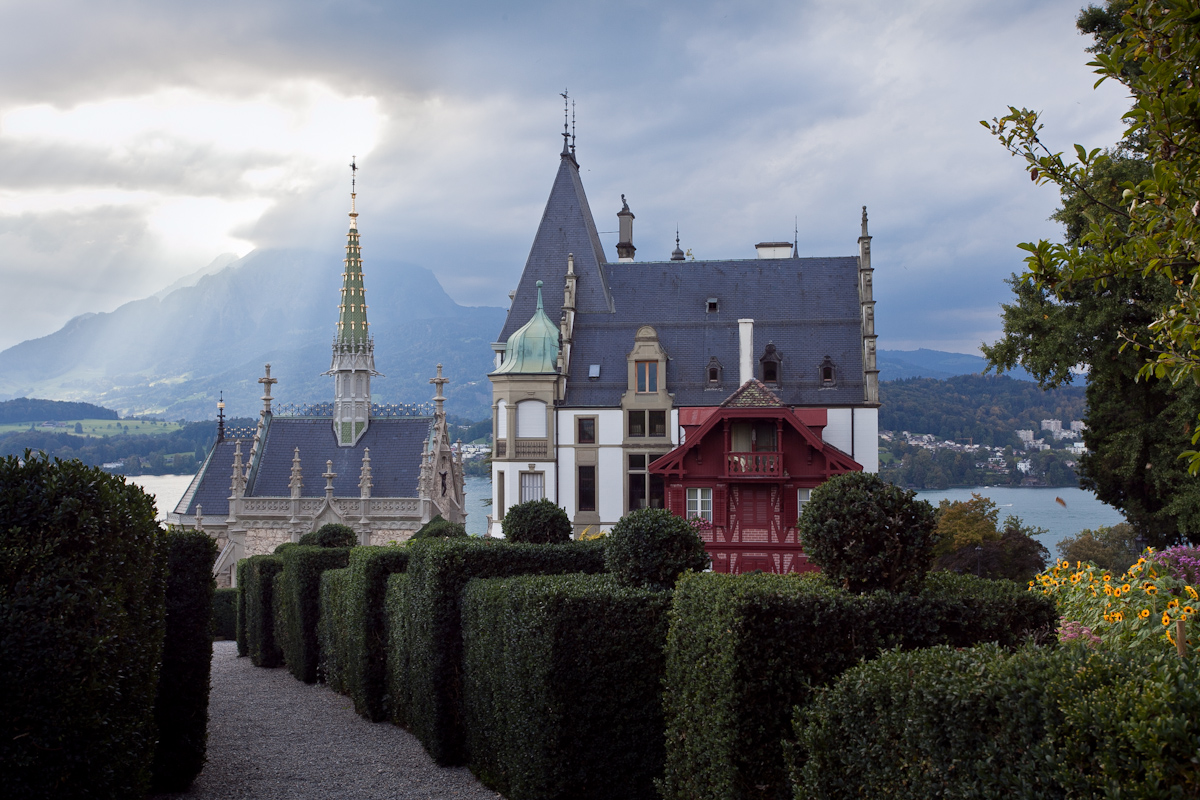

- Coat of arms
- Location of Meggen
- Location within Switzerland Location within Canton of Lucerne
- Coordinates: 47°3′N 8°22′E
- Country: Switzerland
- Canton: Lucerne
- District: Lucerne

Government
  - Mayor: Gemeindepräsident; Carmen Holdener (The Centre) (as of 2024)

Area
  - Total: 13.93 km^{2} (5.38 sq mi)
- Elevation: 479 m (1,572 ft)

Population (December 2020)
  - Total: 7,562
  - Density: 542.9/km^{2} (1,406/sq mi)
- Time zone: UTC+01:00 (CET)
  - Summer (DST): UTC+02:00 (CEST)
- Postal code: 6045
- SFOS number: 1063
- ISO 3166 code: CH-LU
- Surrounded by: Adligenswil, Greppen, Horw, Küssnacht (SZ), Lucerne (Luzern), Stansstad (NW), Weggis
- Website: www.meggen.ch

Meggen is a municipality in the district of Lucerne in the canton of Lucerne in Switzerland.

== History ==
Meggen is first mentioned in 1226 as Meken, though a 14th Century copy of an older document mentions in Acta Murensia around 1160.

== Geography ==
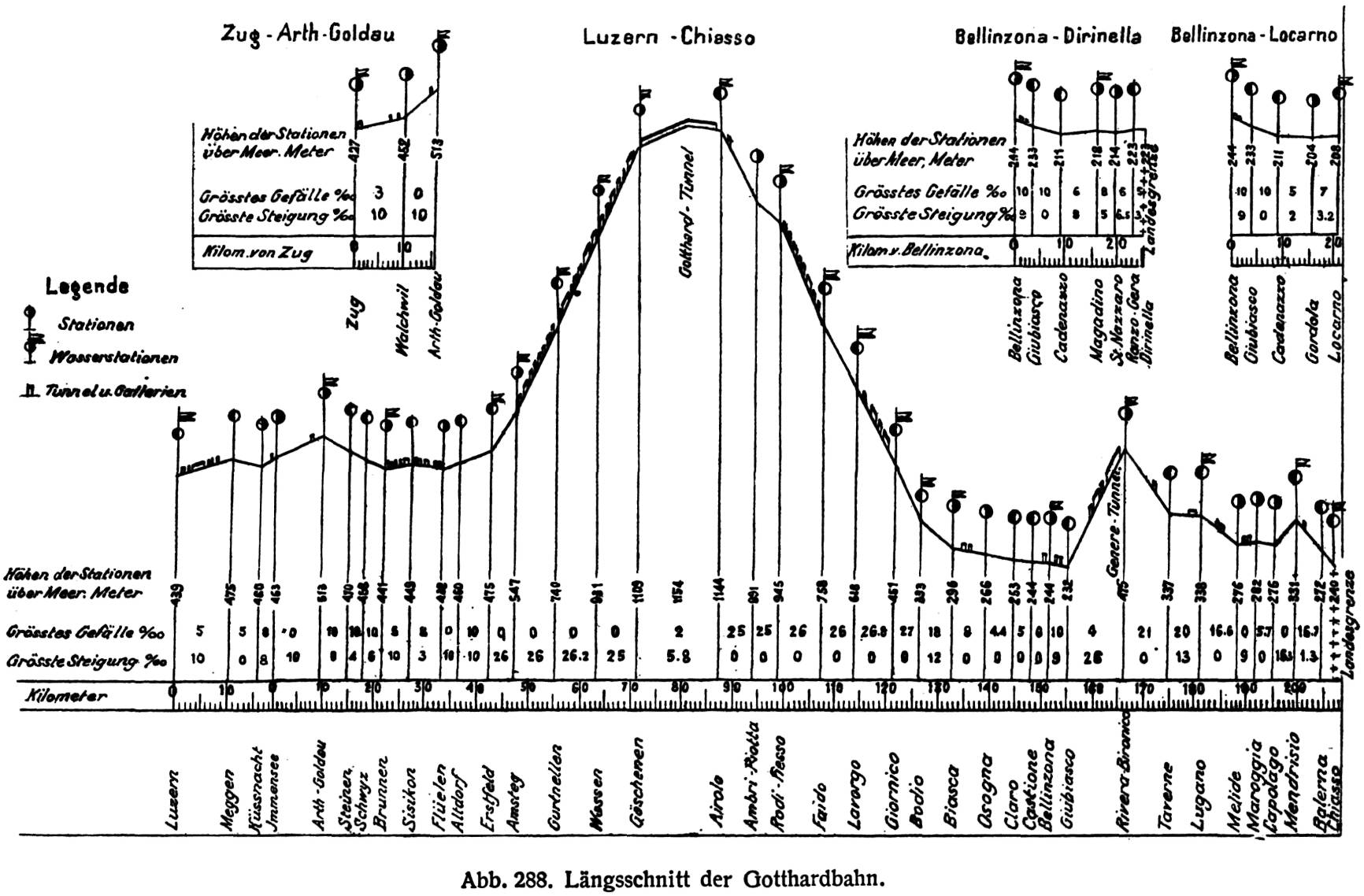
Longitudinal Profile of the Gotthardbahn rail line

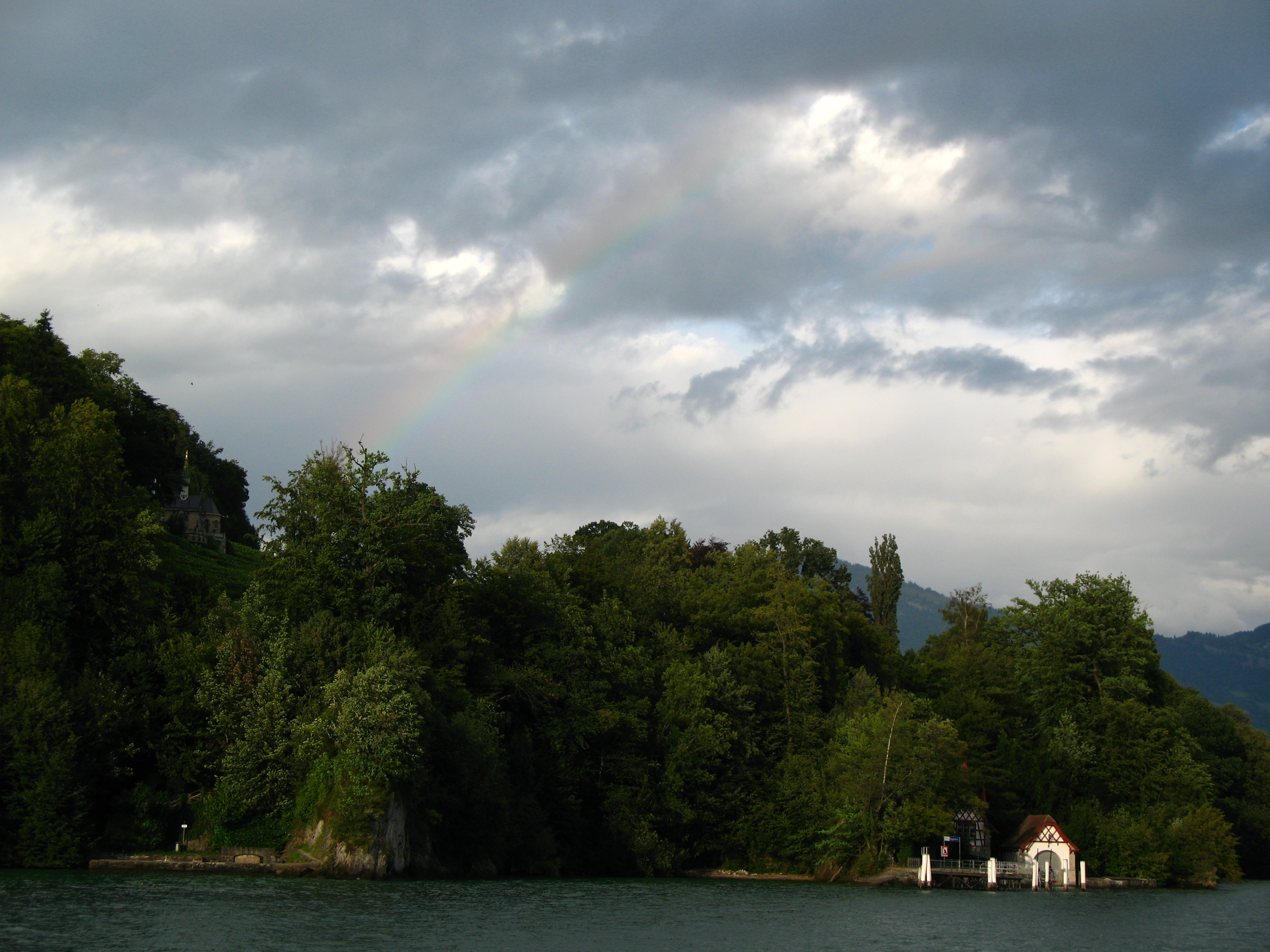
Meggen and the Meggenhorn mountain

Meggen has an area of 7.3 km^{2} (2.8 sq mi). Of this area, 47.6% is used for agricultural purposes, while 23.7% is forested. Of the rest of the land, 28.5% is settled (buildings or roads) and the remainder (0.3%) is non-productive (rivers, glaciers or mountains). In the 1997 land survey, 23.69% of the total land area was forested. Of the agricultural land, 41.6% is used for farming or pastures, while 6.06% is used for orchards or vine crops. Of the settled areas, 20.25% is covered with buildings, 0.41% is industrial, 0.69% is classed as special developments, 1.79% is parks or greenbelts and 5.37% is transportation infrastructure. Of the unproductive areas, and 0.14% is other unproductive land.

The municipality is located on the Küssnacht arm of the Lake of Lucerne. In 1897 it was the end station of the Gotthardbahn.

== Demographics ==
Meggen has a population (as of 31 December 2020) of 7,562. As of 2007, 10.6% of the population was made up of foreign nationals. Over the last 10 years the population has grown at a rate of 10.4%. Most of the population (as of 2000) speaks German (93.3%), with English being second most common ( 1.6%) and Italian being third ( 1.0%).

In the 2007 election the most popular party was the FDP which received 33.1% of the vote. The next three most popular parties were the SVP (24.8%), the CVP (21.8%) and the SPS (10.3%).

The age distribution in Meggen is; 1,300 people or 20.1% of the population is 0–19 years old. 1,304 people or 20.1% are 20–39 years old, and 2,561 people or 39.6% are 40–64 years old. The senior population distribution is 935 people or 14.4% are 65–79 years old, 312 or 4.8% are 80–89 years old and 61 people or 0.9% of the population are 90+ years old.

In Meggen about 86.3% of the population (between age 25-64) have completed either non-mandatory upper secondary education or additional higher education (either university or a Fachhochschule).

As of 2000 there are 2,479 households, of which 752 households (or about 30.3%) contain only a single individual. 136 or about 5.5% are large households, with at least five members. As of 2000 there were 1,149 inhabited buildings in the municipality, of which 974 were built only as housing, and 175 were mixed use buildings. There were 643 single family homes, 118 double family homes, and 213 multi-family homes in the municipality. Most homes were either two (473) or three (337) story structures. There were only 67 single story buildings and 97 four or more story buildings.

Meggen has an unemployment rate of 1.4%. As of 2005, there were 153 people employed in the primary economic sector and about 37 businesses involved in this sector. 199 people are employed in the secondary sector and there are 40 businesses in this sector. 1219 people are employed in the tertiary sector, with 238 businesses in this sector. As of 2000 50.9% of the population of the municipality were employed in some capacity. At the same time, females made up 43.6% of the workforce.

In the 2000 census the religious membership of Meggen was; 3,841 (64.8%) were Roman Catholic, and 1,203 (20.3%) were Protestant, with an additional 51 (0.86%) that were of some other Christian faith. There are 3 individuals (0.05% of the population) who are Jewish. There are 32 individuals (0.54% of the population) who are Muslim. Of the rest; there were 29 (0.49%) individuals who belong to another religion, 598 (10.1%) who do not belong to any organized religion, 166 (2.8%) who did not answer the question.

The historical population is given in the following table:

year	population
about 1465	c. 160
about 1695	c. 460
1798	585
1850	874
1900	1,130
1950	2,165
2000	5,923

== Transportation ==
The municipality has two railway stations: Meggen and Meggen Zentrum. Both are located on the Lucerne–Immensee line.

In addition, the bus lines 24 and 25 pass through Meggen, with a total of 34 stops, 20 of which are located within its municipal area.

== Notable residents ==
- Dimitri Ashkenazy, clarinetist
- Vladimir Ashkenazy, pianist and conductor
- Rolf Brem, sculptor, illustrator and graphic artist
- Claudio Castagnoli, professional wrestler
- James Galway, British flutist
- Ariella Kaeslin, Swiss artistic gymnast
- Marc Rich, commodities trader
- Thomas Rüfenacht, Swiss ice hockey player
- Maria Katherina Scherer, beatified nun
- Demi Vollering, professional road cyclist
