= Rolf Brem =

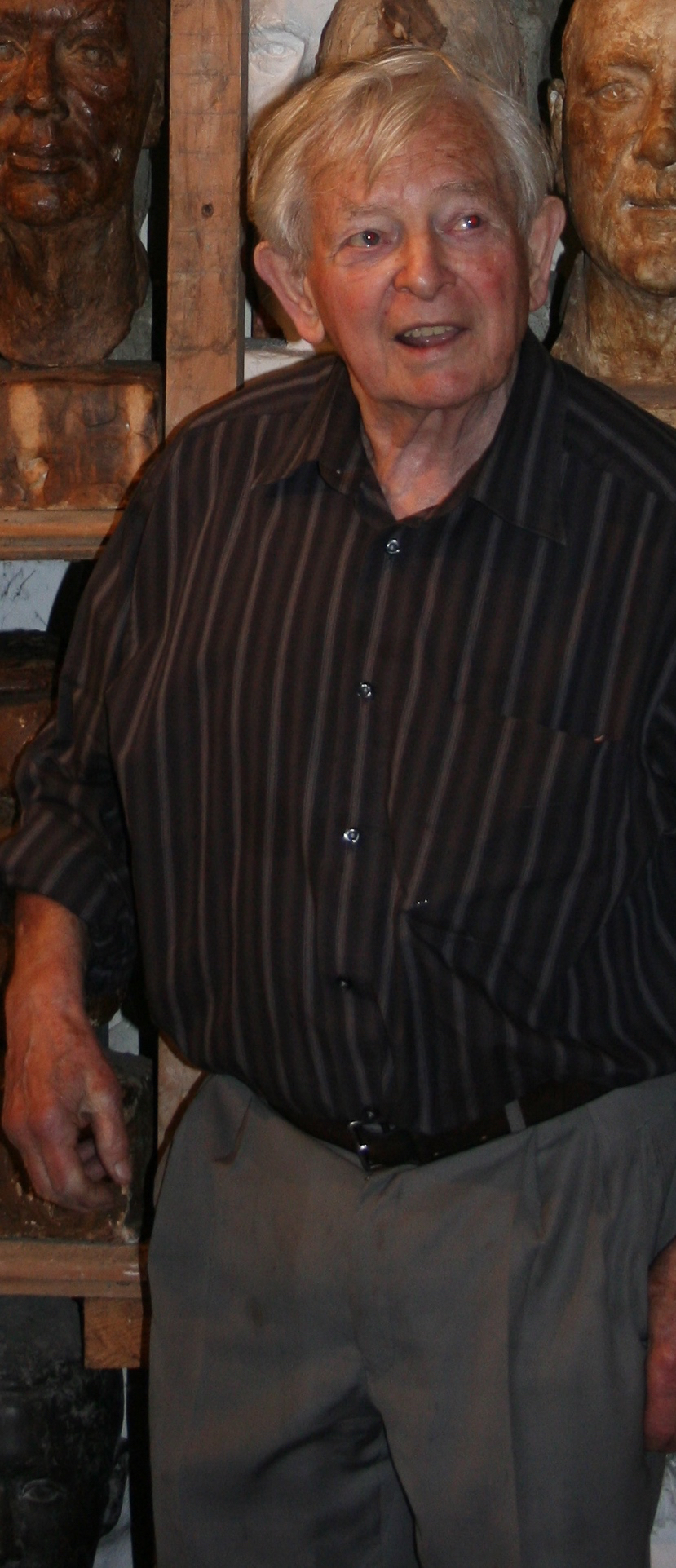
- Rolf Brem with several portraits, some of which were at the Great Exhibition in Seville
- Born: 12 February 1926; Lucerne, Switzerland
- Died: 11 April 2014 (aged 88)
- Education: Art School, Apprenticeship by Karl Geiser
- Known for: Sculpture, Graphics and Illustration
- Movement: Realism
- Awards: Kiefer-Hablützel-Preis, Prize of Art of Lucerne, Prix International de la Médaille in Krakow
- Website: www.rolfbrem.ch

Rolf Brem (12 February 1926 – 11 April 2014) was a Swiss sculptor, illustrator and graphic artist. He worked in Meggen close to Lake Lucerne.

== Biography ==
=== Childhood ===
Rolf Brem grew up in a quarter in Lucerne where most people had conventional professions. There were butchers, bakers, metalworkers or carpenters. His father, Adolf Brem, was a hairdresser. Rolf Brem's godfather and uncle, Johan, was an artist metalworker. When Rolf Brem was only seven years old, he started to model his first sculptures. He made a portrait of Gessler out of clay. When the Second World War started, he made several portraits of General Guisan. Some were painted and some were made out of cement. Rolf Brem was even able to make some money by selling them to his classmates. At that time he also made portraits of his parents and his friends. When Rolf Brem attended secondary school he started to paint with oil colours. However, he continued making sculptures out of clay. He attended secondary school from 1939 until 1945. Brem left secondary school shortly before his final exams. Then he took pictures of his sculptures and went to the artist Hermann Haller. Haller advised Brem to undergo training for a skilled trade in order to have a constant salary. He believed that it would soon show if Rolf Brem was talented or not.

=== Apprenticeships ===
Rolf Brem decided to start an apprenticeship as a ceramist. After a few weeks, Rolf Brem was not interested in his work anymore and so he decided to quit and to attend art school in 1945. During this time he was allowed to assist Hans von Matt, a local sculptor. After three years at art school, Rolf Brem stopped attending because he wanted to work. Rolf Brem had heard about a sculptor called Karl Geiser who was born in 1898. Karl Geiser was one of the most famous Swiss sculptors whose works of art were much in demand. Rolf Brem wrote to Karl Geiser and applied for a job as an apprentice. In 1948, Rolf Brem stopped going to school entirely and worked full-time for Karl Geiser. The following ten years Rolf Brem worked in Karl Geiser's studio. He thoroughly learnt the craftsmanship and in the process he became an artist. Geiser showed and explained the clear forms of his sculptures to him. He taught him how to look at a face properly in order to be able to make a good portrait.

=== Studios ===
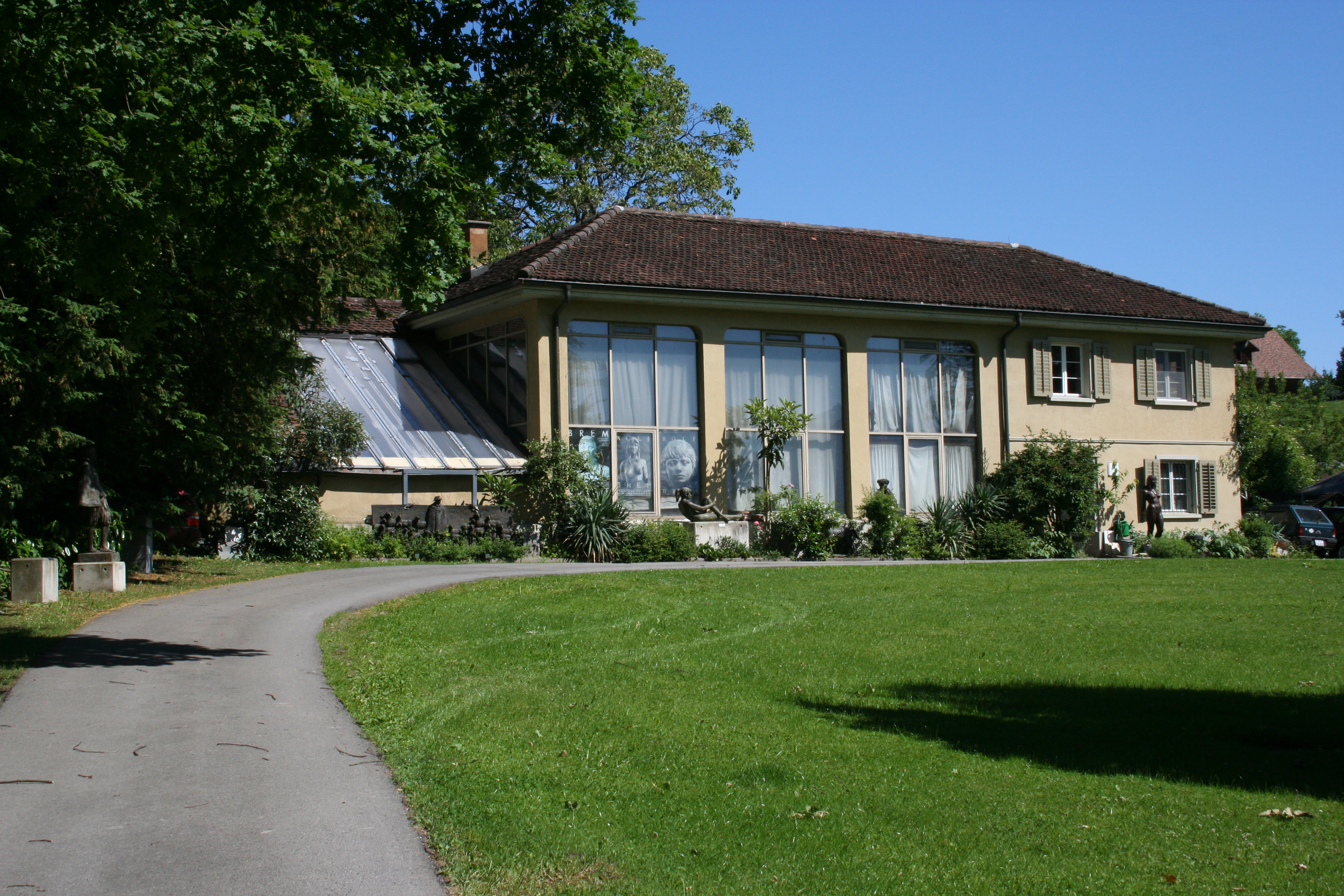
Rolf Brems Studio at St. Charles-Hall, Meggen, Lucerne, Switzerland

Rolf Brem was not always at Karl Geiser's studio in Zurich. From 1946 until 1952 Rolf Brem had his own first studio in Lucerne, in an old ramshackle house in Maihofstreet. The studio was very important for Rolf Brem. It was in his studio where Rolf Brem made his first portraits in his own style. In 1952 Rolf Brem was able to rent a new studio, a former brewery, in Zurichstreet in Lucerne. The new studio was larger than the previous one and had water and electricity. There was a flat roof which Rolf Brem used to make monumental delineation. Rolf Brem was able to make his own production beside Geiser's production. But the influence was still remarkable. Since 1957, Rolf Brem has had his studio in Meggen, near Lucerne. It is situated in the former orangery of the large St. Charles-Hall. The studio, located in the middle of a beautiful park, is rather large and constantly flooded by light. Rolf Brem has used this studio for more than fifty years. In 1972 Rolf Brem decided to have a second studio close to the Perseo Art foundry, in which he cast his sculptures. The studio is in Mendrisio, in the Italian part of Switzerland. His studio is located in an old farm in Morbio Superiore in Mendrisiotto.

=== Hard Times ===
Karl Geiser committed suicide in 1957. It was a hard time for Rolf Brem. He had worked for him until a few days before his death. Rolf Brem said that Geiser's death was even harder to bear than his parents’ death. After Karl Geiser's death, Rolf Brem's style started to change. His figures were less statical. They became more and more individual and agile.

== Art ==
=== Portraits ===
Over the course of Rolf Brem's six-decade career, he created numerous sculpted portraits. Some of them of celebrities like the flutist James Galway, the author Günter Grass, theologian, priest, and author Hans Küng, and the financier Marc Rich. Believing that making an effective portrait requires a certain level of acquaintance between the model and the artist, Rolf Brem was friends with those he chose to sculpt.

=== Works ===
Between 1965 and 1985 Rolf Brem produced several sculptures for churches and graveyards. He made a crucifix for the Church Meggen and created the whole interior decoration for the Saint Boniface church in Geneva and the church in Nebikon. Rolf Brem created the thaler for the 800-year anniversary of Lucerne. In 1975 he won the “Prix International de la Médaille” in Kraków. After his wife's death in 1982 he started to model goats. Rolf Brem was fascinated by their hard-bitten and intractable character. He studied their bone structure and drew sketches. Since then he has modelled goats while they are eating, sleeping or while they are scratching.

=== Great Exhibition in Seville ===
In February 1992 Rolf Brem received an invitation from Harald Szeemann, a curator. Harald Szeemann was preparing the “Suisse Pavilion” in Seville for the Great Exhibition and wanted to display portraits made by Rolf Brem. 136 portraits made by Rolf Brem were exhibited. All the portraits were displayed on a shelf.

=== Creating his Portraits ===
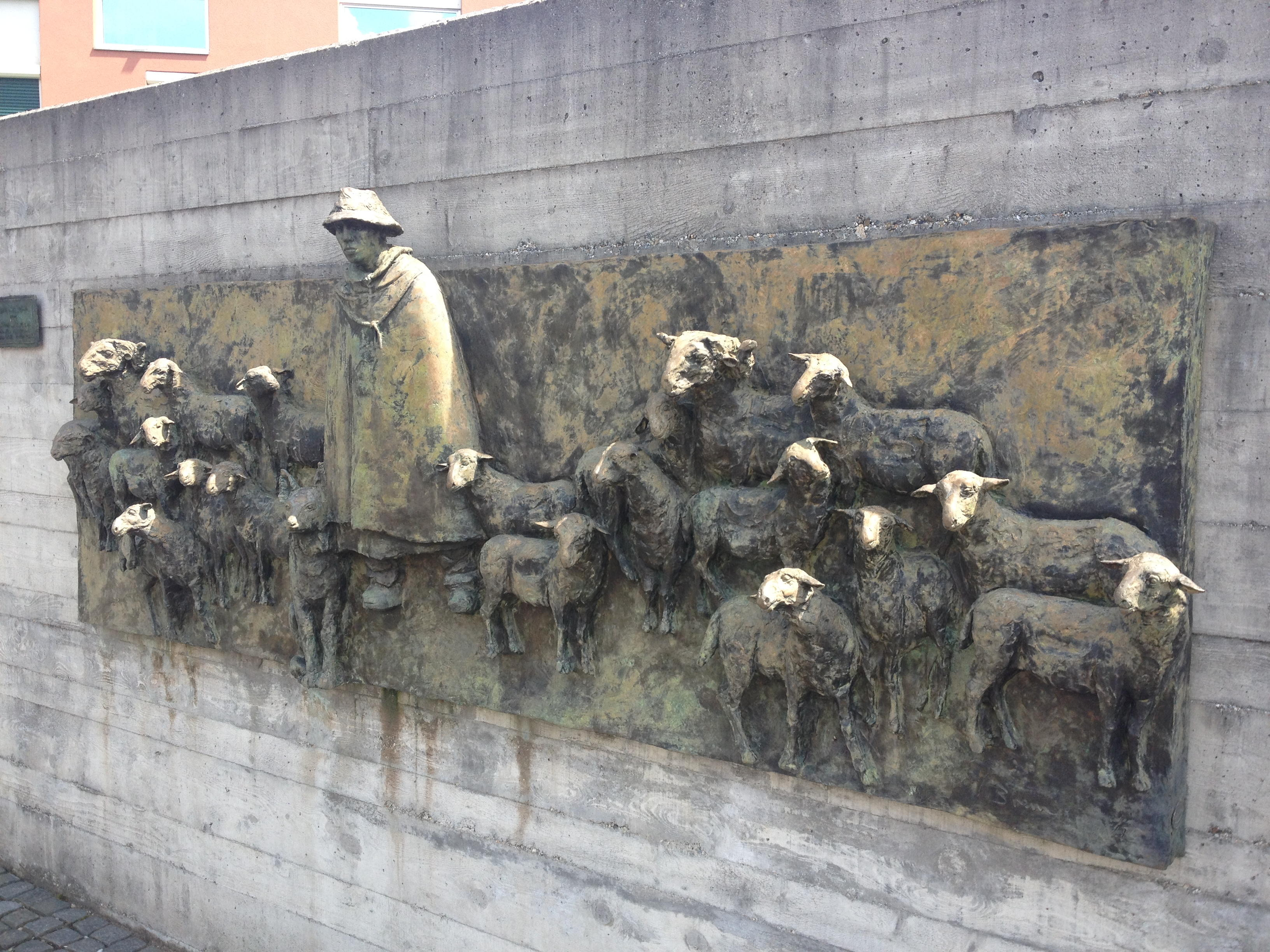
Relief Shepherd and flock, Bronze 360 x 110 cm, front of the entrance to the Centro Evangelico Magliaso, Canton Ticino, Switzerland.

Rolf Brem rarely draws sketches before he starts to model. He finds it easier to work with plastic. Rolf Brem usually takes his inspiration from his everyday life. If he notices something, he tries to make a model from his mind. However, if he wants to create a tall figure he needs a real model. Then he tries to shape the form out of clay, wax, cement or plasticine. It needs to be a flexible material so he can play with the volume. To make a head, Rolf Brem starts by building a frame out of wood to avoid that the clay can fall down. Firstly, he shapes a normal head without knowing before what the person looks like. Rolf Brem organises several meetings to work and spends about one hour at a time on the portrait. His concentration is just good for about an hour, afterwards it decreases rapidly. It usually takes four to six meetings until a portrait is finished. If Rolf Brem is close to the final result, he makes a plaster cast to save his work. Afterwards it is easier to work bravely. Once he finishes forming the portrait and makes a plaster cast, he takes the plaster cast to Mendrisio to cast it into bronze.
