= Luzern Verkehrshaus railway station =

Railway station in Lucerne, Switzerland

Luzern Verkehrshaus
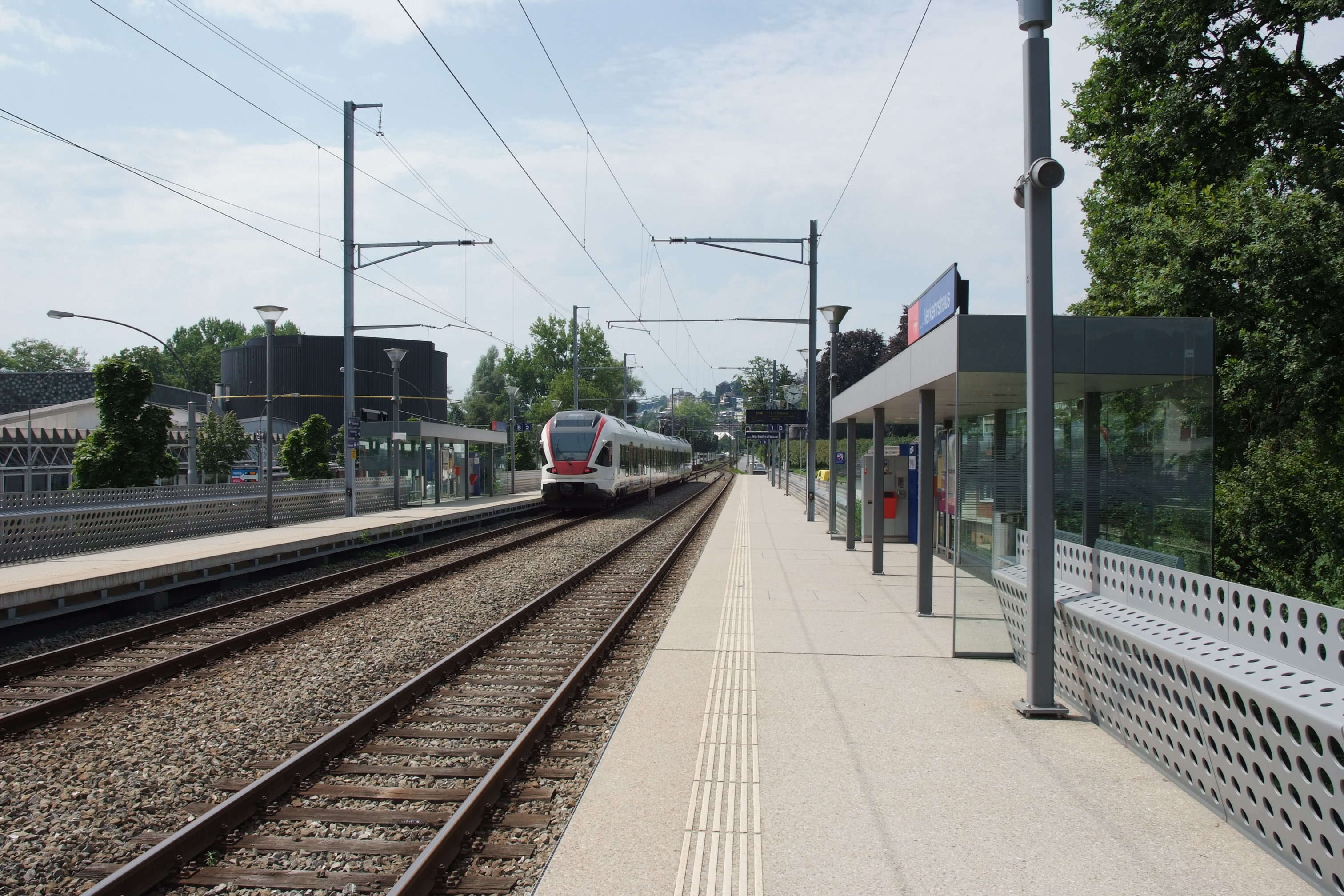
- The platforms at Lucerne Verkehrshaus in 2013

General information
- Location: Lucerne; Switzerland
- Coordinates: 47°03′14″N 8°20′14″E
- Elevation: 439 m (1,440 ft)
- Owner: Swiss Federal Railways
- Line: Lucerne–Immensee line
- Distance: 6.1 km (3.8 mi) from Lucerne
- Train operators: Swiss Federal Railways; Südostbahn
- Connections: Verkehrsbetriebe Luzern bus and trolleybus lines

Other information
- Fare zone: 10 (Passepartout)

History
- Opened: 2007
- Former names: Würzenbach (service station at same location)

Passengers
- 2018: 610 per weekday

Services
Preceding station	Südostbahn	Following station
Lucerne Terminus	Voralpen Express	Meggen Zentrum towards St. Gallen
Preceding station	Lucerne S-Bahn	Following station
Lucerne Terminus	S3	Meggen Zentrum towards Brunnen
Location

Luzern Verkehrshaus railway station (German: Bahnhof Luzern Verkehrshaus) is a railway station in the city of Lucerne, in the Swiss canton of Lucerne. It is an intermediate stop on the standard gauge Lucerne–Immensee line of Swiss Federal Railways. The station is directly adjacent to the Swiss Museum of Transport. Connections to the Lake Lucerne Navigation Company's ferries on Lake Lucerne are available at the Verkehrshaus-Lido landing stage on the other side of the museum from the station.

The station was opened in 2007. Previously a service station "Würzenbach" was located there.

== Services ==
As of the December 2020 timetable change, the following services stop at Luzern Verkehrshaus:

- IR Voralpen-Express: hourly service between Lucerne and St. Gallen.
- Lucerne S-Bahn S3: hourly service between Lucerne and Brunnen.

== See also ==
- Rail transport in Switzerland
