= Küssnacht =

Municipality in Schwyz canton, Switzerland

- Municipality
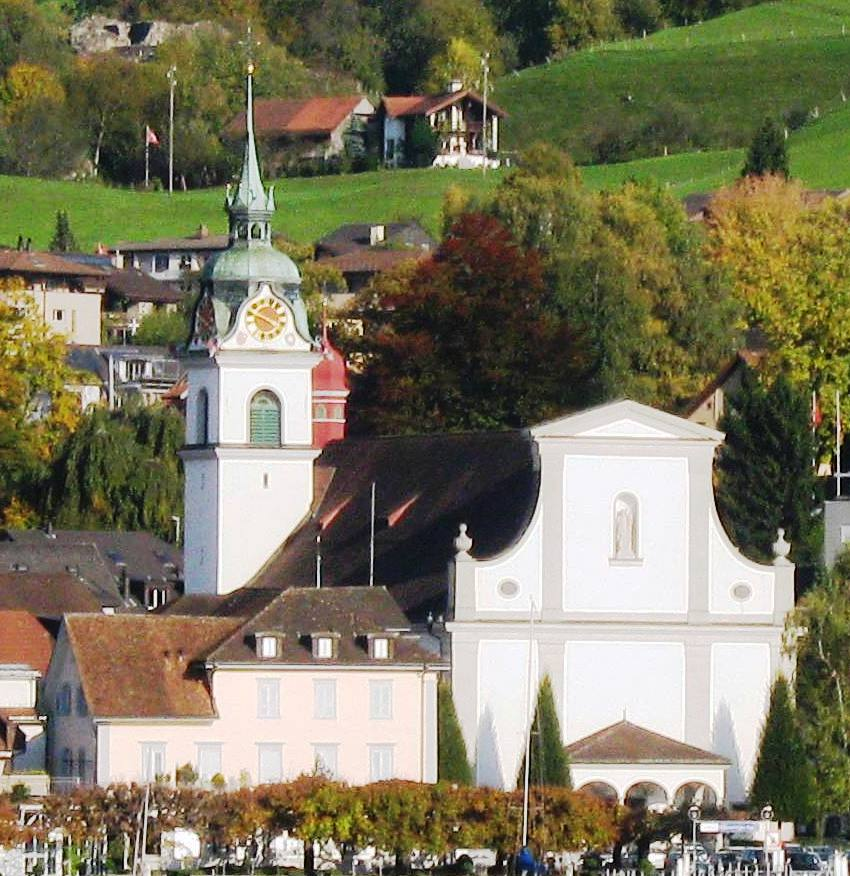

- Flag Coat of arms
- Location of Küssnacht
- Location within Switzerland Location within Canton of Schwyz
- Coordinates: 47°04′59″N 8°26′18″E
- Country: Switzerland
- Canton: Schwyz
- District: Küssnacht

Government
  - Mayor: Bezirksammann; Michael Fuchs

Area
  - Total: 36.20 km^{2} (13.98 sq mi)
- Elevation (Hauptplatz, Küssnacht): 441 m (1,447 ft)

Population (December 2020)
  - Total: 13,531
  - Density: 373.8/km^{2} (968.1/sq mi)
- Time zone: UTC+01:00 (CET)
  - Summer (DST): UTC+02:00 (CEST)
- Postal code: 6403
- SFOS number: 1331
- ISO 3166 code: CH-SZ
- Localities: Küssnacht SZ, Immensee, Merlischachen
- Surrounded by: Greppen, Meggen, Adligenswil, Udligenswil, Meierskappel, Risch, Walchwil and Arth
- Twin towns: Küssaberg (Germany), Zduny (Poland)
- Website: www.kuessnacht.ch

Küssnacht am Rigi (official name since 2004: Küssnacht) is a village, municipality and district in the canton of Schwyz in central Switzerland. The municipality consists of the three villages Küssnacht, Immensee, and Merlischachen, the hamlet Haltikon, the industrial area Fänn, and the alp Seeboden. It is situated at the north shore of Lake Lucerne and at the south shore of Lake Zug below mount Rigi (1,797 m or 5,896 ft).

== History ==
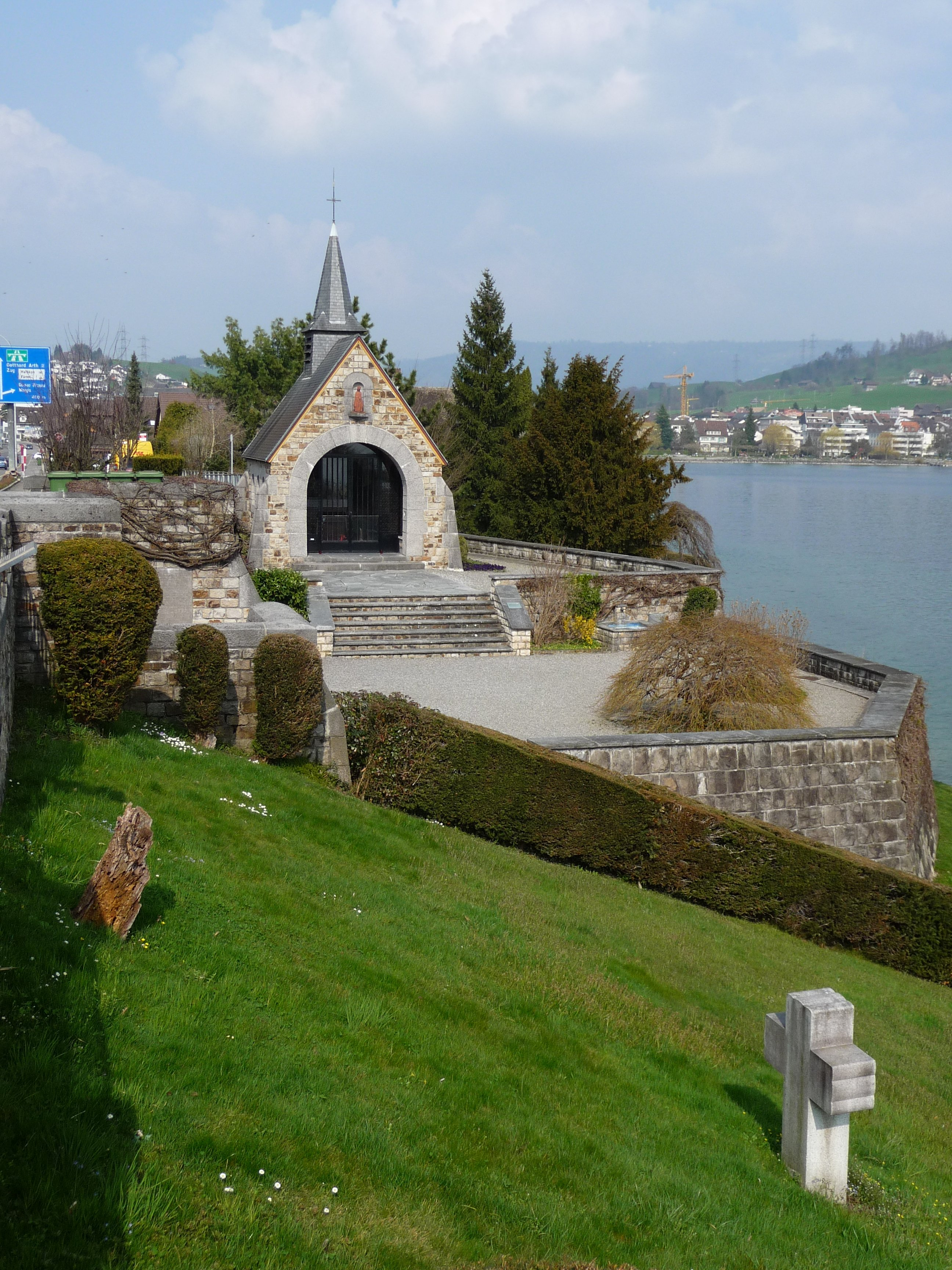
Astrid Chapel (Küssnacht), built on the site of Queen Astrid of Belgium's fatal road accident. The tree stump is what remained after 1992 of the original tree and was finally removed in 2010, being replaced by a fresh pear tree.

Küssnacht is first mentioned around 840 as in Chussenacho though this is from an 11th-century copy of the original document. In 1179 it was mentioned as Chussenacho.

In 1424 Küssnacht became a district of the canton of Schwyz.

Its etymology comes from the German words "küss" and "nacht", meaning "kiss" and "night" respectively.

According to the legend of Wilhelm Tell, the hero shot the Austrian bailiff Gessler at the Hohle Gasse near the Gesslerburg with his crossbow:

"Here through this deep defile he needs must pass; there leads no other road to Küssnacht."

— Friedrich Schiller, William Tell

On August 29, 1935, Queen Astrid of the Belgians was killed here in a road accident. A memorial chapel ("Königin-Astrid-Kapelle") was built at the accident scene. On March 4, 1989, the chapel was demolished by youths, to be restored later that year.

The well known Klausjagen ("Nicholas chase") festival takes place in Küssnacht every year on the eve of Saint Nicholas Day (December 5). The festival, attended by about 20,000 people, consists of a parade of around 1,000 participants, and lasts far into the night.

== Geography ==
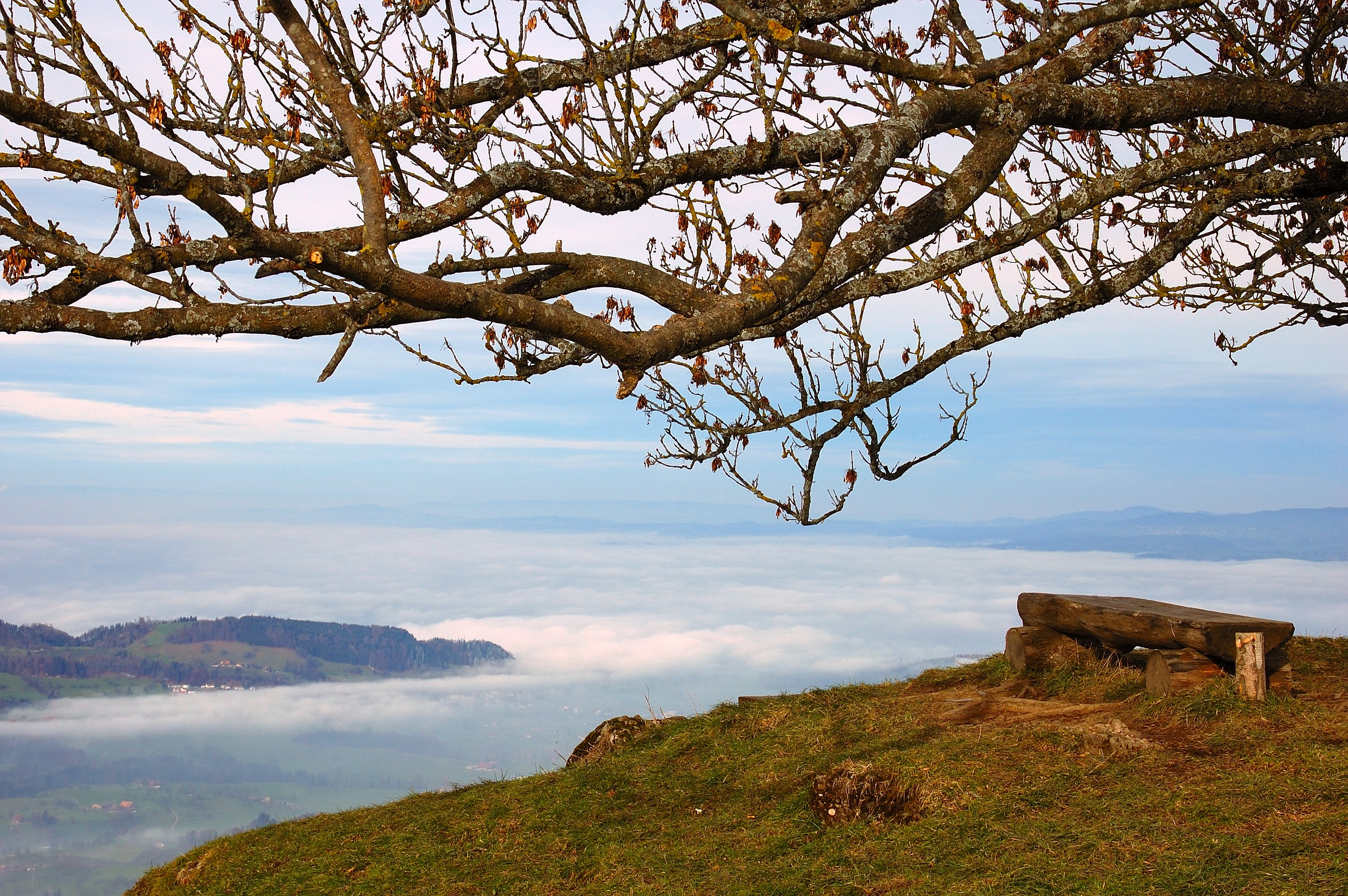
View from Seebodenalp over Lake Zug

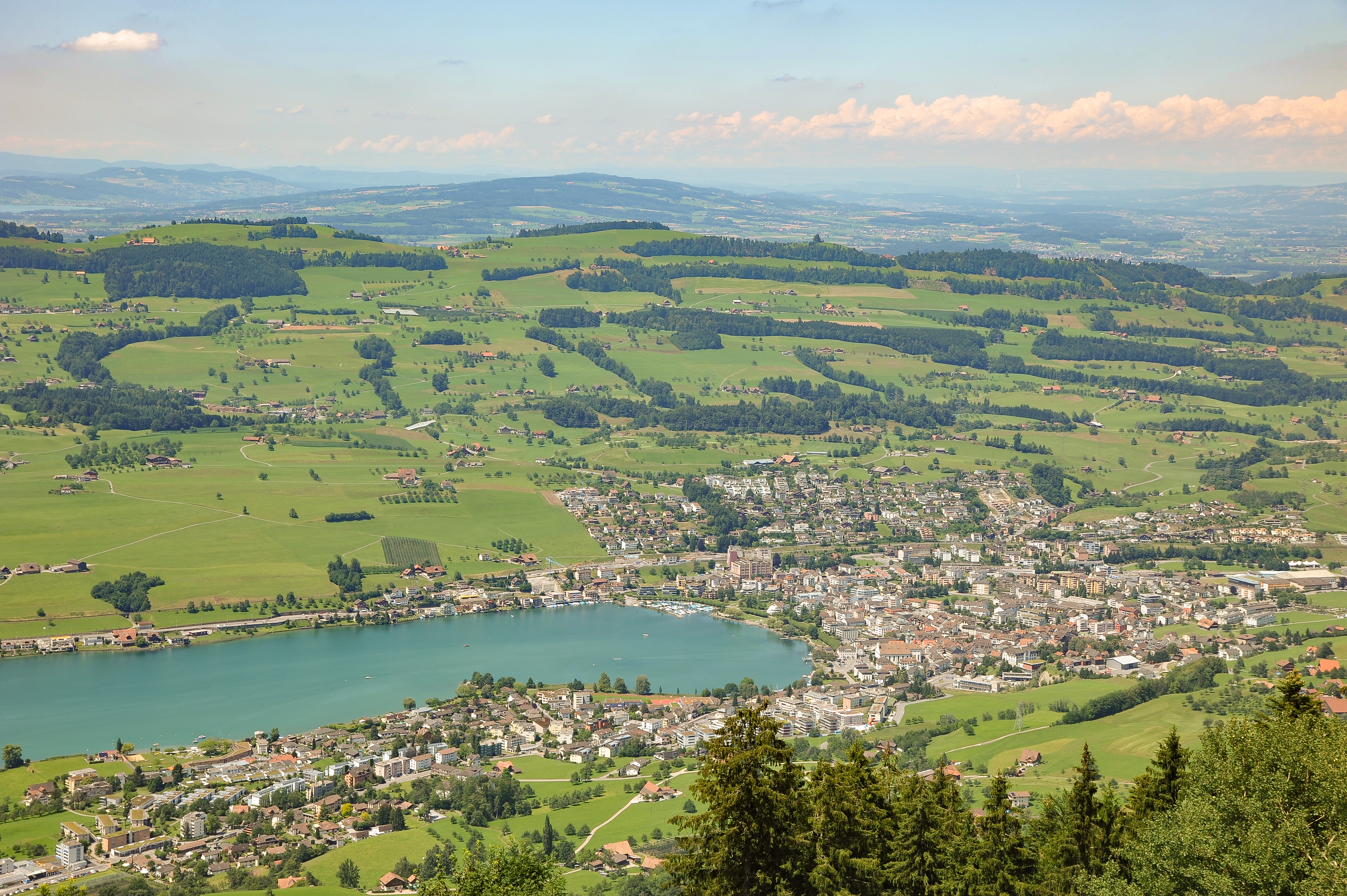
Küssnacht viewed from Rigi Kulm

Aerial view from 800 m by Walter Mittelholzer (1920)

Küssnacht has an area, (as of the 2004/09 survey) of 29.37 km^{2} (11.34 sq mi). Of this area, about 55.8% is used for agricultural purposes, while 26.4% is forested. Of the rest of the land, 16.5% is settled (buildings or roads) and 1.3% is unproductive land. In the 2004/09 survey a total of 270 ha (670 acres) or about 9.2% of the total area was covered with buildings, an increase of 82 ha (200 acres) over the 1982 amount. Over the same time period, the amount of recreational space in the municipality increased by 44 ha (110 acres) and is now about 2.07% of the total area.

Of the agricultural land, 138 ha (340 acres) is used for orchards and vineyards, 1,344 ha (3,320 acres) is fields and grasslands and 200 ha (490 acres) consists of alpine grazing areas. Since 1982 the amount of agricultural land has decreased by 128 ha (320 acres). Over the same time period the amount of forested land has increased by 7 ha (17 acres). Rivers and lakes cover 16 ha (40 acres) in the municipality.

The municipality is at the foot the Rigi mountain between the Lake of Lucerne and Lake Zug. It consists of the villages of Küssnacht, Immensee and Merlischachen as well as the hamlets of Haltikon and Seebodenalp.

It is the capital and only municipality of the district of Küssnacht.

== Demographics ==
Küssnacht has a population (as of December 2020) of 13,531. As of 2015, 21.1% of the population are resident foreign nationals. In 2015 a small minority (642 or 5.2% of the population) was born in Germany. Over the last 5 years (2010–2015) the population has changed at a rate of 1.63%. The birth rate in the municipality, in 2015, was 10.4, while the death rate was 7.9 per thousand residents.

Most of the population (as of 2000) speaks German (87.5%), with Albanian and Serbo-Croatian being each spoken by about 2.7% of the population.

As of 2015, children and teenagers (0–19 years old) make up 19.6% of the population, while adults (20–64 years old) are 62.4% of the population and seniors (over 64 years old) make up 18.0%. In 2015 there were 5,252 single residents, 5,620 people who were married or in a civil partnership, 570 widows or widowers and 981 divorced residents.

In 2015 there were 5,360 private households in Küssnacht with an average household size of 2.27 persons. In 2015 about 40.6% of all buildings in the municipality were single family homes, which is less than the percentage in the canton (50.4%) and much less than the percentage nationally (57.4%). Of the 1,980 inhabited buildings in the municipality, in 2000, about 45.5% were single family homes and 32.0% were multiple family buildings. Additionally, about 16.6% of the buildings were built before 1919, while 15.9% were built between 1991 and 2000. In 2014 the rate of construction of new housing units per 1000 residents was 6.21. The vacancy rate for the municipality, in 2016, was 0.82%.

The historical population is given in the following chart:

== Heritage sites of national significance ==
The Gesslerburg Castle and the Hohle Gasse with the Tell Chapel are listed as Swiss heritage sites of national significance. The village of Küssnacht am Rigi and the hamlet of Merlischachen are part of the Inventory of Swiss Heritage Sites.

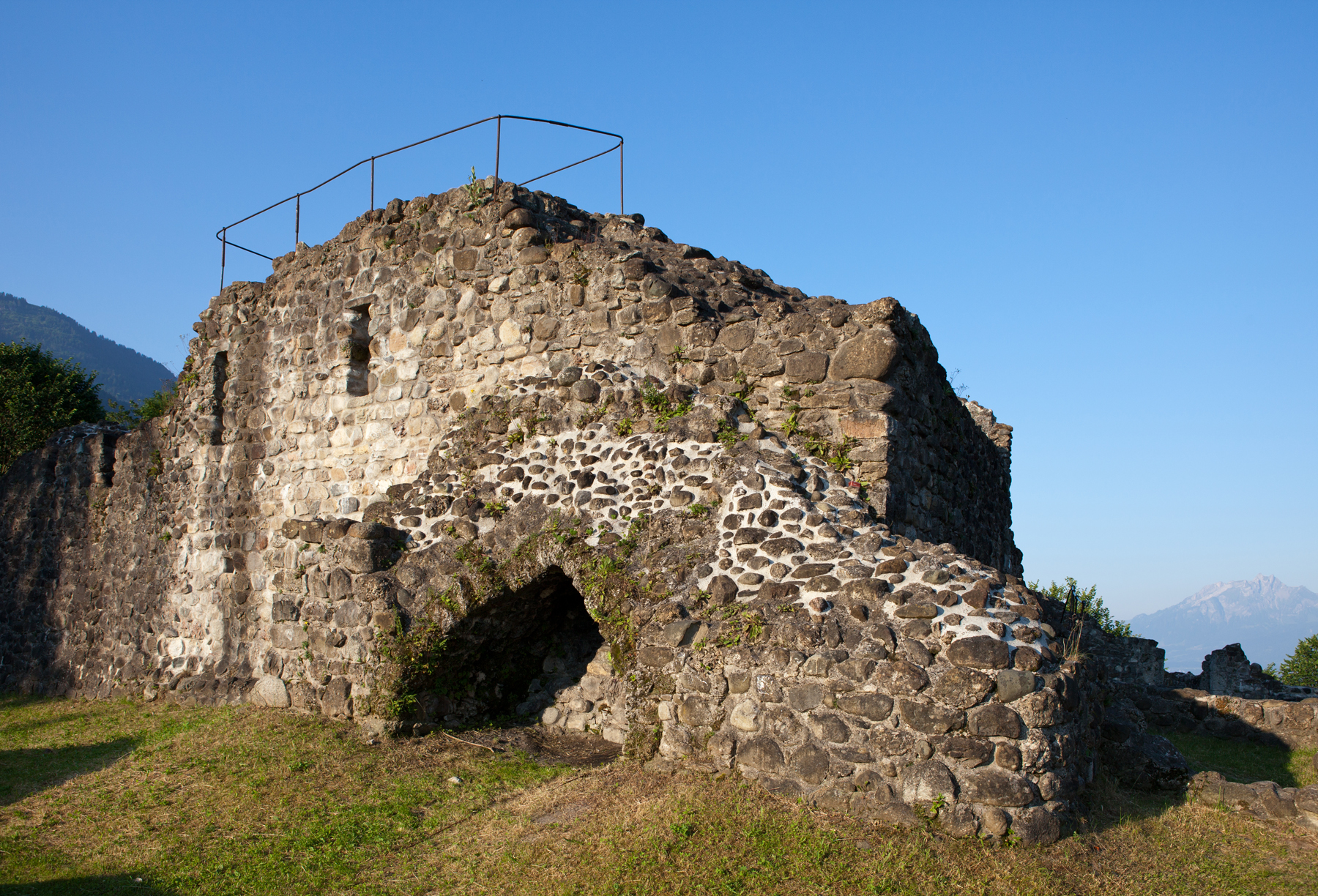
Ruins of Gesslerburg Castle

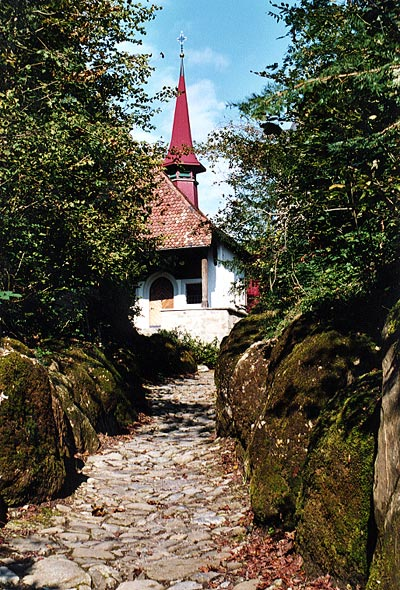
Tell Chapel in the Hohle Gasse

== Politics ==
In the 2015 federal election the most popular party was the FDP with 32.9% of the vote. The next three most popular parties were the SVP (29.9%), the CVP (20.6%) and the SP (11.0%). In the federal election, a total of 4,700 votes were cast, and the voter turnout was 57.3%. The 2015 election saw a large change in the voting when compared to 2011 with the percentage received for the FDP increasing from 24.2% to 32.9%.

In the 2007 election the most popular party was the SVP which received 36.3% of the vote. The next three most popular parties were the CVP (25.6%), the FDP (21.6%) and the SPS (12.1%).

== Education ==
In Küssnacht about 72.9% of the population (between age 25–64) have completed either non-mandatory upper secondary education or additional higher education (either university or a Fachhochschule).

== Transportation ==
The municipality has three railway stations: Küssnacht am Rigi, Immensee, and Merlischachen. All three are located on the Lucerne–Immensee line. The ferry terminal at Küssnacht am Rigi (See) is a short distance from the Küssnacht am Rigi railway station and has service to multiple destinations on Lake Lucerne.

== Economy ==
Küssnacht is classed as a regional business center.

As of 2014, there were a total of 6,849 people employed in the municipality. Of these, a total of 306 people worked in 114 businesses in the primary economic sector. The secondary sector employed 2,659 workers in 191 separate businesses. There were 31 small businesses with a total of 779 employees and 13 mid sized businesses with a total of 1,449 employees. Finally, the tertiary sector provided 3,884 jobs in 821 businesses. There were 64 small businesses with a total of 1,626 employees and two mid sized businesses with a total of 256 employees.

In 2015 a total of 6.2% of the population received social assistance. In 2011 the unemployment rate in the municipality was 1.6%.

In 2015 local hotels had a total of 61,077 overnight stays, of which 55.6% were international visitors.

In 2015 the average cantonal, municipal and church tax rate in the municipality for a couple with two children making SFr 80,000 was 3% while the rate for a single person making SFr 150,000 was 9%. The canton has a slightly lower than average tax rate for those making SFr 80,000 and one of the lowest for those making SFr 150,000. In 2013 the average income in the municipality per tax payer was SFr 116,269 and the per person average was SFr 54,036, which is greater than the cantonal averages of SFr 114,716 and SFr 51,545 respectively It is also greater than the national per tax payer average of SFr 82,682 and the per person average of SFr 35,825.

== Religion ==
From the 2000 census, 7,891 or 73.7% are Roman Catholic, while 1,152 or 10.8% belonged to the Swiss Reformed Church. Of the rest of the population, there are less than 5 individuals who belong to the Christian Catholic faith, there are 146 individuals (or about 1.36% of the population) who belong to the Eastern Orthodox Church, and there are 17 individuals (or about 0.16% of the population) who belong to another Christian church. There are less than 5 individuals who are Jewish, and 501 (or about 4.68% of the population) who are Islamic. There are 76 individuals (or about 0.71% of the population) who belong to another church (not listed on the census), 563 (or about 5.26% of the population) belong to no church, are agnostic or atheist, and 354 individuals (or about 3.31% of the population) did not answer the question.

== Crime ==
In 2014 the crime rate, of the over 200 crimes listed in the Swiss Criminal Code (running from murder, robbery and assault to accepting bribes and election fraud), in Küssnacht was 33.6 per thousand residents. This rate is only 52.0% of the average rate in the entire country. During the same period, the rate of drug crimes was 6.5 per thousand residents, which is 65.7% of the national rate. The rate of violations of immigration, visa and work permit laws was 2.8 per thousand residents, which is only 57.1% of the rate for the entire country.

== Notable people ==
- Hekuran Kryeziu (born 1993), professional footballer
- César Ritz, hotelier
