= Lucerne–Immensee railway line =

Railway line in Switzerland

Lucerne–Immensee
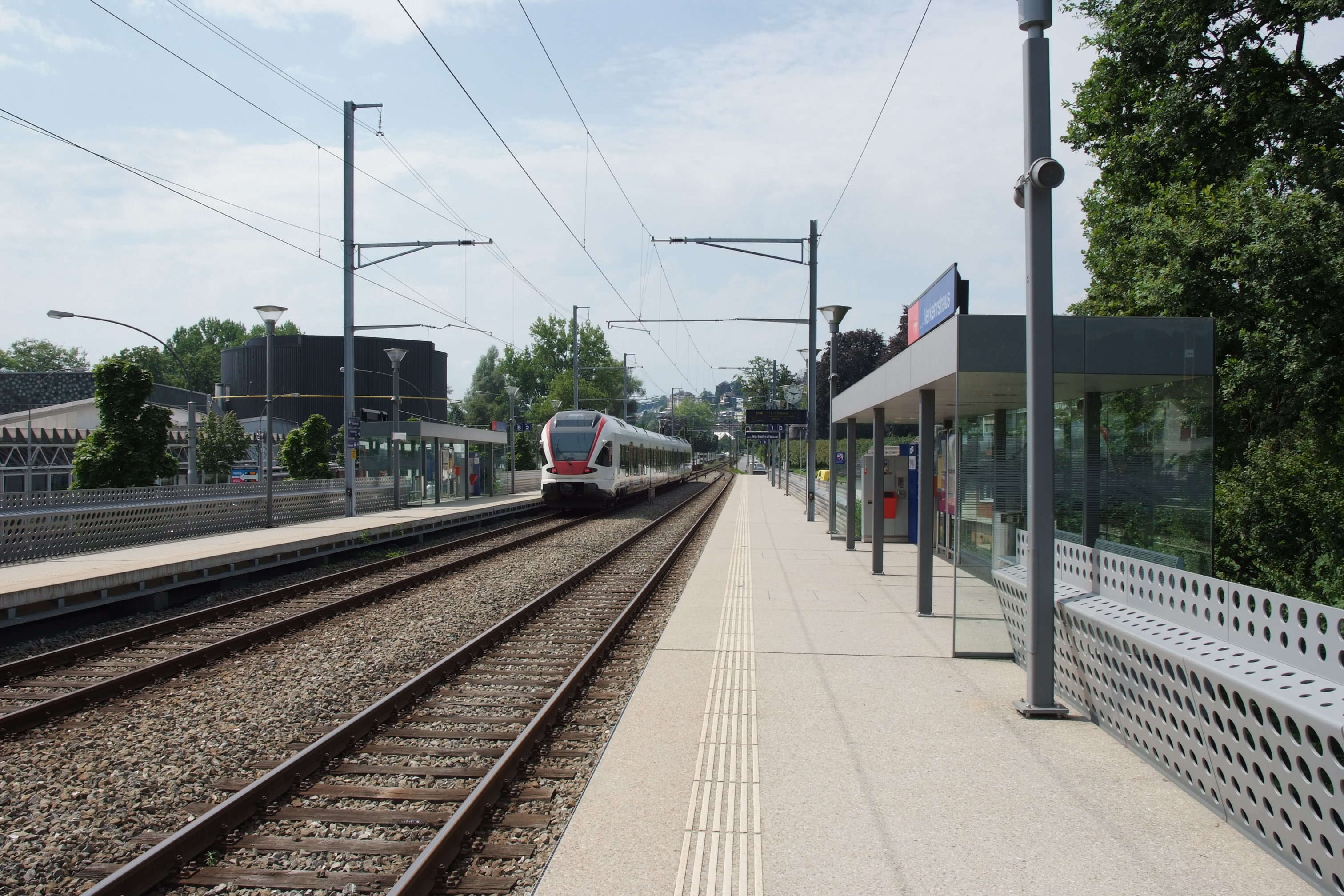
- Luzern Verkehrshaus (Transport Museum) station

Overview
- Line number: 600
- Locale: Switzerland
- Termini: Lucerne; Immensee

Technical
- Line length: 19.20 km (11.93 mi)
- Track gauge: 1,435 mm (4 ft 8 1/2 in)
- Electrification: 15 kV/16.7 Hz AC overhead catenary
- Maximum incline: 1.1%

The Lucerne–Immensee railway line is a railway line in Switzerland that connects Lucerne with Immensee, the starting point of the Gotthard railway. It was built by the Gotthardbahn-Gesellschaft (GB) and opened on 1 June 1897 as the approach from Lucerne to the Gotthard railway. With the nationalisation of the Gotthardbahn on 1 May 1909, the line became the property of the Swiss Federal Railways (Schweizerische Bundesbahnen, SBB).

== Route ==
The line has seven stations and halts in the municipalities of Lucerne and Meggen as well as in the district of Küssnacht. The line is single-track and crossing moves are only possible at the stations of Küssnacht am Rigi, Meggen and Lucerne Verkehrshaus (operated as the Würzenbach crossing loop until 2007), which are used as a result of the half-hourly services operated on the line.

The line between Lucerne and Immensee was threatened with closure in 1994, with passenger traffic to be transferred to buses.

In 1997, the line was closed allow various renovations, including a new station in Küssnacht. Since then, the Gotthard long-distance trains to Lucerne have run via Rotkreuz and the line via Küssnacht has been reserved for regional traffic and long-distance trains to Romanshorn.

The halt of Meggen Zentrum was opened on 2006 as part of the Lucerne S-Bahn; Lucerne Verkehrshaus station (Swiss Transport Museum) was created in the area of the Würzenbach passing loop (Dienststation) and opened in 2007.

Since March 2011, Küssnacht station has been rebuilt. An island platform including an underpass was built, removing the former level crossing used by pedestrians to cross the tracks to reach one platform. This is part of a project to upgrade the station to be a regional transport hub.

== Rail services ==
The line is served by hourly services on line S3 of the Lucerne S-Bahn on the Lucerne–Küssnacht–Brunnen route and hourly Voralpen-Express services. The latter stops at Lucerne Verkehrshaus, Meggen Zentrum and Küssnacht, while the S-Bahn serves all stations. The two routes result in services at approximately half-hourly intervals. On the edges of the day and in the morning peak hour, the Voralpen Express trains run from Romanshorn only to Rapperswil or Herisau. Between Brunnen or Arth-Goldau and Lucerne, the S3 services run at half-hourly intervals and serve all stops.
