= North-Eastern Swiss Alps =

This article focuses on the part of the Alps and Pré-Alps that is located in North-Eastern Switzerland and compromises the Schwyzer Alps and the Appenzell Alps. This region is bordered by: Lake Lucerne in the south-west; the Klausen Pass, upper Linth valley and Lake Walen in the south; the Rhine valley in the east; Lake Constance in the north.

== Peaks ==
Some of the chief peaks of the Swiss (Pre-)Alps, north of the Klausen Pass, are:

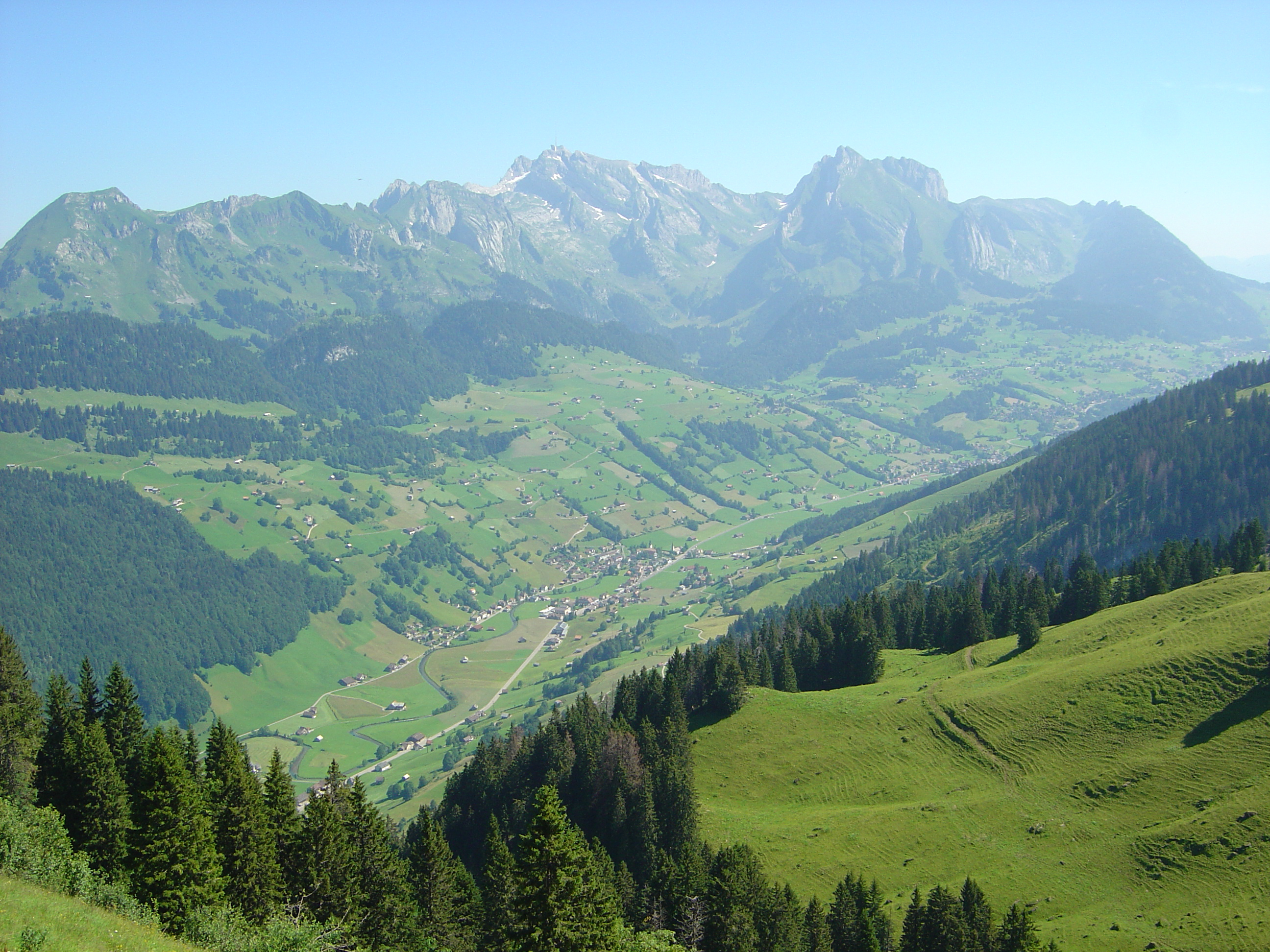
Säntis above Alt St. Johann in the Toggenburg

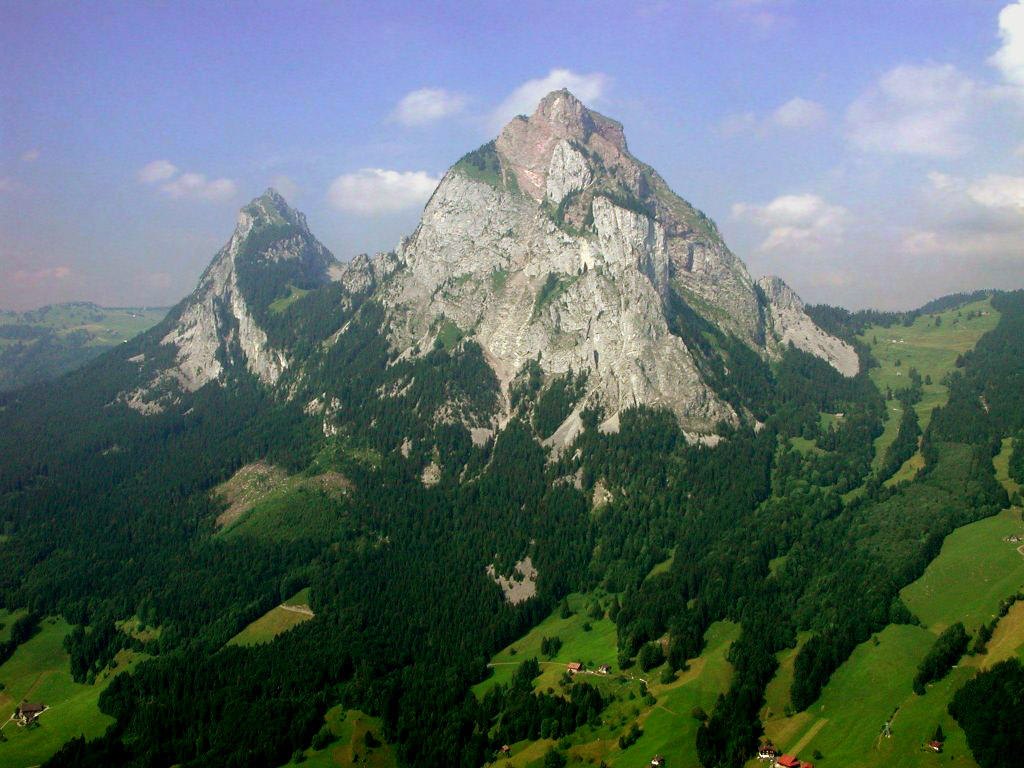
Grosser and Kleiner Mythen

| Name | Elevation (m) | Elevation (ft) |
|---|---|---|
| Glärnisch (highest) | 2,915 | 9,564 |
| Bös Fulen (Böser Faulen) | 2,802 | 9,193 |
| Schächentaler Windgällen | 2,764 | 9,068 |
| Ortstock | 2,717 | 8,914 |
| Höch Turm | 2,666 | 8,747 |
| unnamed peak of the Jegerstöck | 2,584 | 8,478 |
| Pfannenstock | 2,573 | 8,442 |
| Signalstock (part of the Jegerstöck) | 2,573 | 8,442 |
| Glatten | 2,505 | 8,219 |
| Säntis | 2,502 | 8,209 |
| Chaiserstock | 2,515 | 8,251 |
| Rossstock | 2,461 | 8,074 |
| Altmann | 2,435 | 7,989 |
| Gamsberg | 2,384 | 7,822 |
| Gross-Fulfirst | 2,384 | 7,822 |
| Alper Horn | 2,380 | 7,810 |
| Chli-Fulfirst | 2,373 | 7,785 |
| Alvier | 2,342 | 7,684 |
| Isisizer Rosswis | 2,334 | 7,657 |
| Silberen | 2,319 | 7,608 |
| Hinderrugg (highest of the Churfirsten range) | 2,306 | 7,566 |
| Mutteristock | 2,294 | 7,526 |
| Rautispitz | 2,283 | 7,490 |
| Druesberg | 2,282 | 7,487 |
| Schijen | 2,259 | 7,411 |
| Brünnelistock | 2,133 | 6,998 |
| Speer | 1,951 | 6,401 |
| Chlingenstock | 1,935 | 6,348 |
| Fronalpstock (Schwyz) | 1,921 | 6,302 |
| Grosser Mythen | 1,898 | 6,227 |
| Rigi Kulm | 1,798 | 5,899 |
| Hoher Kasten | 1,791 | 5,876 |
| Wildspitz of the Rossberg | 1,580 | 5,180 |
| Hochstuckli | 1,566 | 5,138 |
| Zugerberg | 1,039 | 3,409 |
| Hochwacht of the Albis chain | 878 | 2,881 |
| Uetliberg (part of the Albis chain) | 873 | 2,864 |

== Passes ==
The chief passes of the Swiss Alps, north of the Klausen Pass, are:

Note: road status as of 1911.

| Mountain pass | location | type (as of 1911) | elevation (m) | elevation (ft) |
|---|---|---|---|---|
| Ruosalperkulm | Schächen Valley to the Muota Valley | footpath | 2,172 | 7,126 |
| Karren Alp Pass | Muota Valley to Linthal | footpath | 2,096 | 6,877 |
| Kinzigkulm Pass | Schächen Valley to the Muota Valley | footpath | 2,076 | 6,811 |
| Saasberg Pass | Einsiedeln to Glarus | footpath | 1,898 | 6,227 |
| Kamor Pass | Appenzell to Rüthi | bridle path | 1,680 | 5,510 |
| Saxerlücke | Appenzell to Sax | footpath | 1,651 | 5,417 |
| Schwein Alp Pass | Wägital (Wäggithal) to | bridle path | 1,572 | 5,157 |
| Pragel Pass | Muotathal to Glarus | carriage road in progress | 1,554 | 5,098 |
| Hacken Pass | Schwyz to Einsiedeln | footpath | 1,417 | 4,649 |
| Holzegg Pass | Schwyz to Einsiedeln | bridle path | 1,407 | 4,616 |
| Ibergeregg Pass | Schwyz to Iberg and Einsiedeln | carriage road | 1,406 | 4,613 |
| Krazeren Pass | Nesslau to Urnäsch | bridle path | 1,217 | 3,993 |

== See also ==
- Central Eastern Alps
- Glarus Alps
- Coolidge, William Augustus Brevoort (1911). "Alps" . In Chisholm, Hugh (ed.). Encyclopædia Britannica. Vol. 1 (11th ed.). Cambridge University Press. p. 745.
