= Kinzig Pass =

Mountain pass in Switzerland

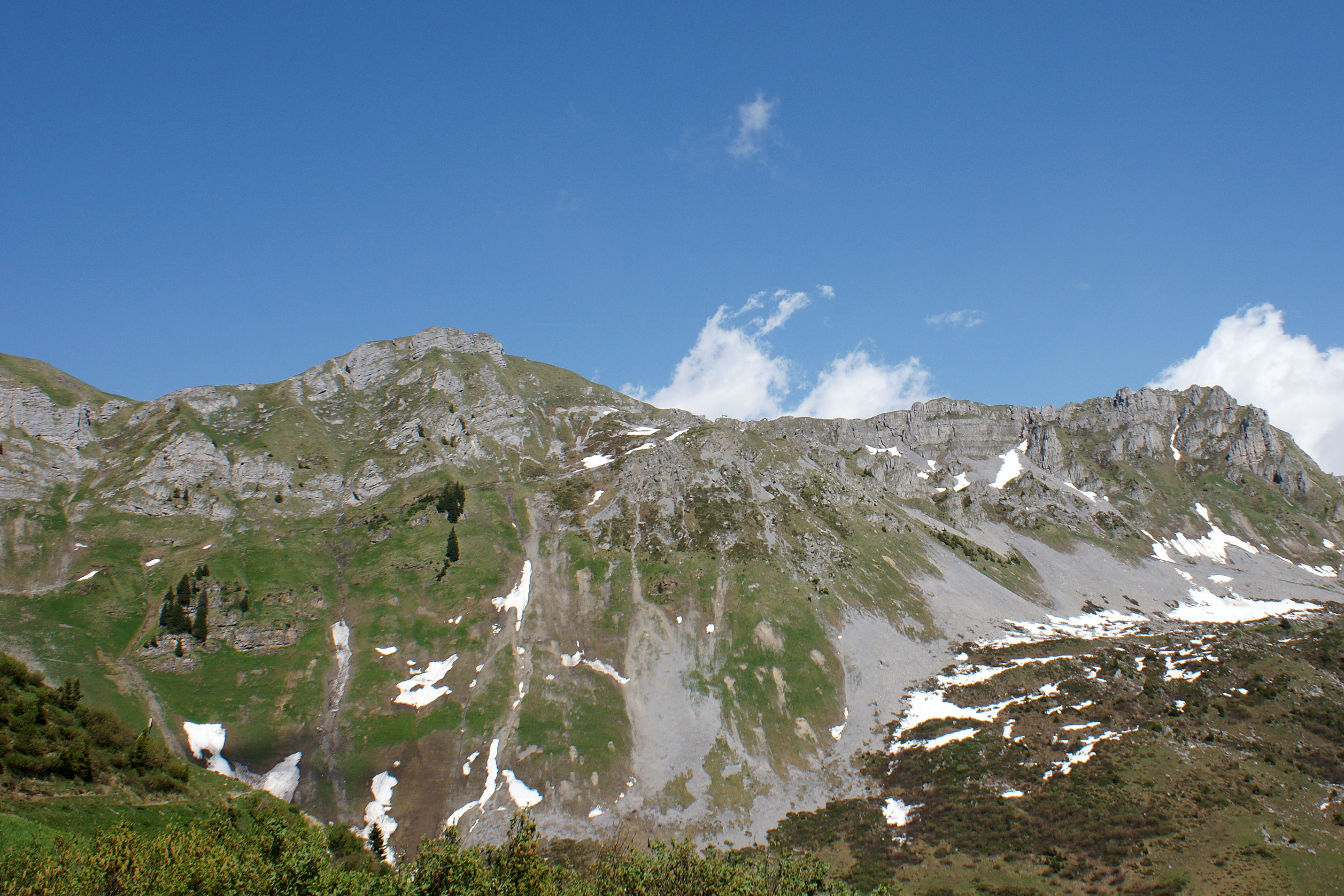
- Kinzig Pass, seen from the Weissenboden

- Location within Switzerland
- Elevation: 2,073 metres (6,801 ft)
- Traversed by: Trail

Third Approach
- Location: Uri and Schwyz, Switzerland
- Range: Schwyz Alps
- Coordinates: 46°54′26″N 8°43′32″E
- Topo map: swisstopo

The Kinzig Pass or Chinzig Pass or Chinzig Chulm (German: Kinzigpass) is a high mountain pass in the Schwyz Alps of Central Switzerland. The trail across the pass reaches a maximum elevation of 2,073 metres (6,801 ft). During the War of the Second Coalition, the Allied army of Alexander Suvorov marched across the pass.

== Geography ==
The Kinzig Pass is traversed by a trail connecting the Schächental in the Canton of Uri and the Muota Valley in the Canton of Schwyz. Starting from the south side of the range, the trail starts near Bürglen and Spiringen and crosses the pass to the village of Muotathal on the north side. The top of the pass is southeast of the Rossstock, elevation 2,460 metres (8,071 ft), and south of the Chaiserstock, elevation 2,514 metres (8,248 ft).

== History ==
During the Napoleonic Wars, the Allied army commanded by Russian Field Marshal Suvorov crossed the pass from south to north on 27–28 September 1799. The westernmost column of soldiers started their climb a short distance east of Bürglen while the easternmost column, including Suvorov, started from Spiringen. The Allied army included about 20,000 Russians and 2,000 Austrians.

== See also ==
- List of mountain passes in Switzerland
