= Wasserbergfirst =

Mountain in Switzerland

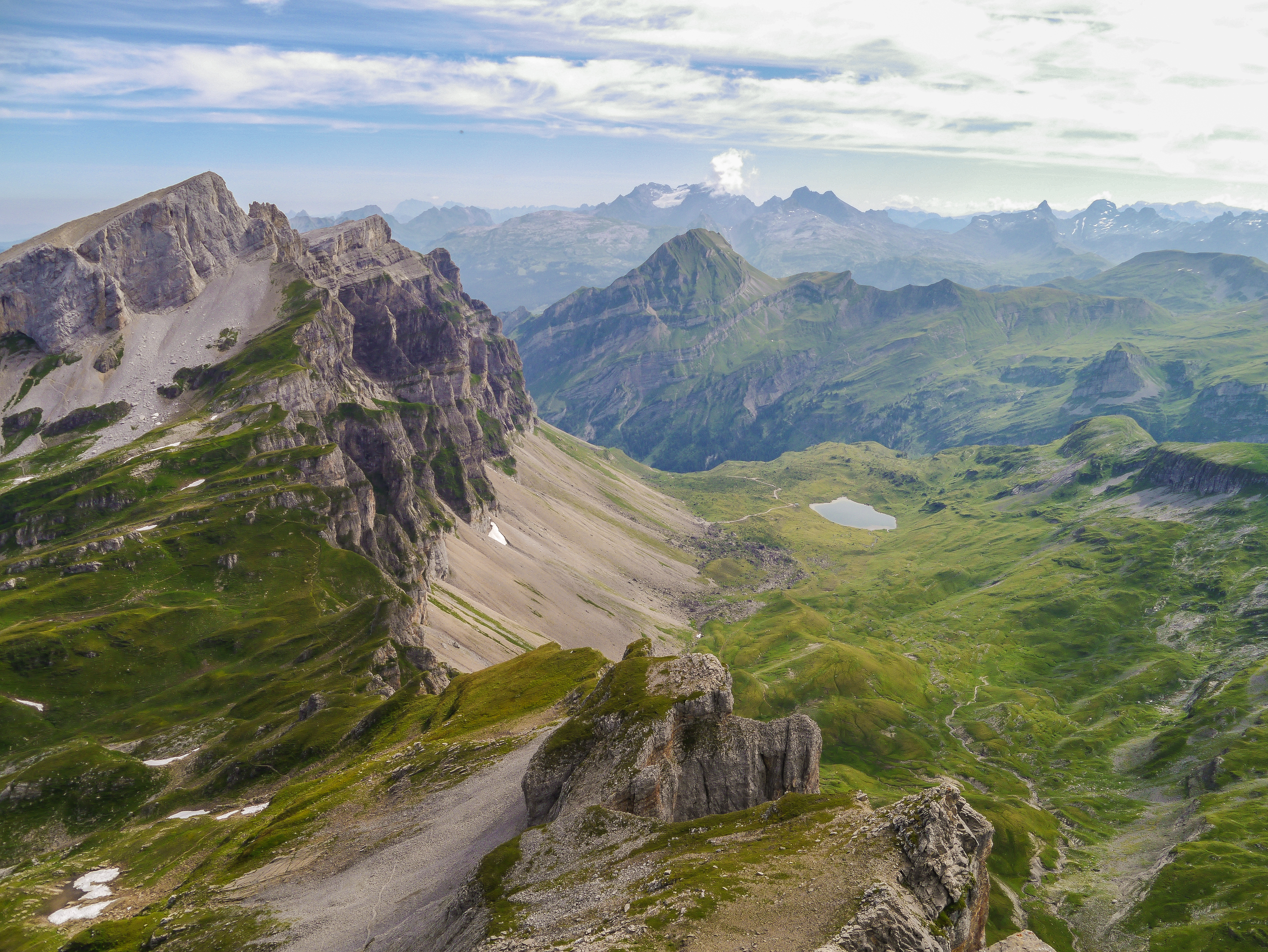
- The Wasserbergfirst (centre) from the Fulen

Highest point
- Elevation: 2,341 m (7,680 ft)
- Prominence: 325 m (1,066 ft)
- Parent peak: Schächentaler Windgällen
- Coordinates: 46°56′22″N 8°47′21″E

Geography
- Location within Switzerland Location within Canton of Schwyz
- Country: Switzerland
- Canton: Schwyz
- Parent range: Schwyz Alps

The Wasserbergfirst (2,341 m or 7,680 ft) is a mountain of the Schwyz Alps, located south of Muotathal in the canton of Schwyz, Switzerland. It lies on the range between the Hürital and the Bisistal, north of the Schächentaler Windgällen.

== See also ==
- List of mountains of the canton of Schwyz
