= Fluebrig =

Mountain in Switzerland

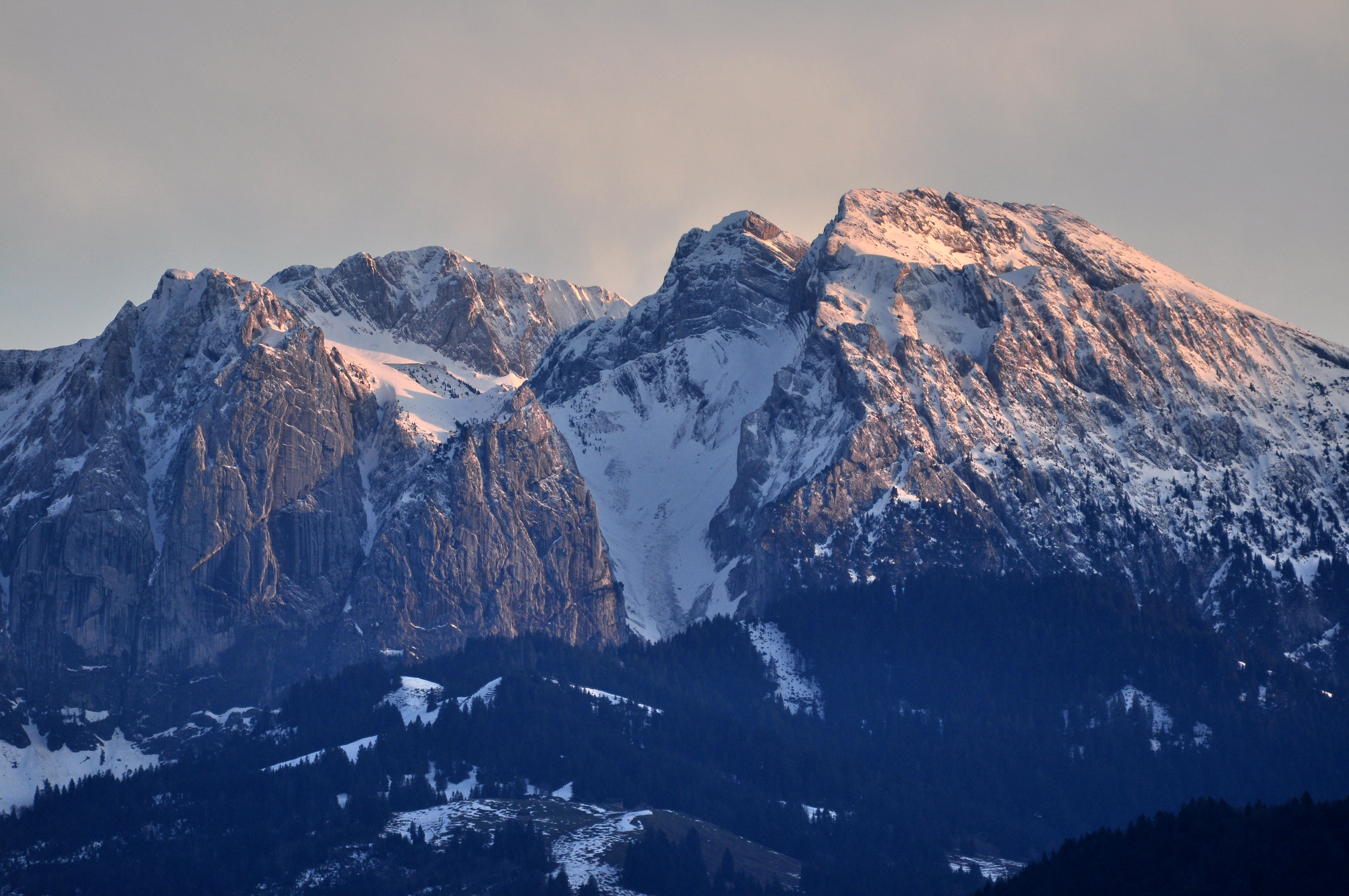
- The northern side of the Fluebrig massif, as seen from Rapperswil-Jona

Highest point
- Peak: Diethelm
- Elevation: 2,098 m (6,883 ft)
- Prominence: 268 m (879 ft)
- Parent peak: Druesberg
- Coordinates: 47°3′41″N 8°53′0″E

Geography
- Location within Switzerland Location within Canton of Schwyz
- Country: Switzerland
- Canton: Schwyz
- Parent range: Schwyzer Alps
- Topo map: Swiss Federal Office of Topography swisstopo

The Fluebrig is a mountain massif of the Schwyzer Alps, located east of Unteriberg in the canton of Schwyz, Switzerland. It is composed of several summits of which the highest is named Diethelm (2,098 m [6,883 ft]) and the second highest Turner (2,069 m [6,788 ft]).

The Fluebrig overlooks the Lake of Sihl (towards north-west) and the Lake of Wägital (towards north-east). The Fläschenspitz is located on the ridge south of Fluebrig.

== See also ==
- List of mountains of the canton of Schwyz
