= Chöpfenberg =

Mountain in Switzerland

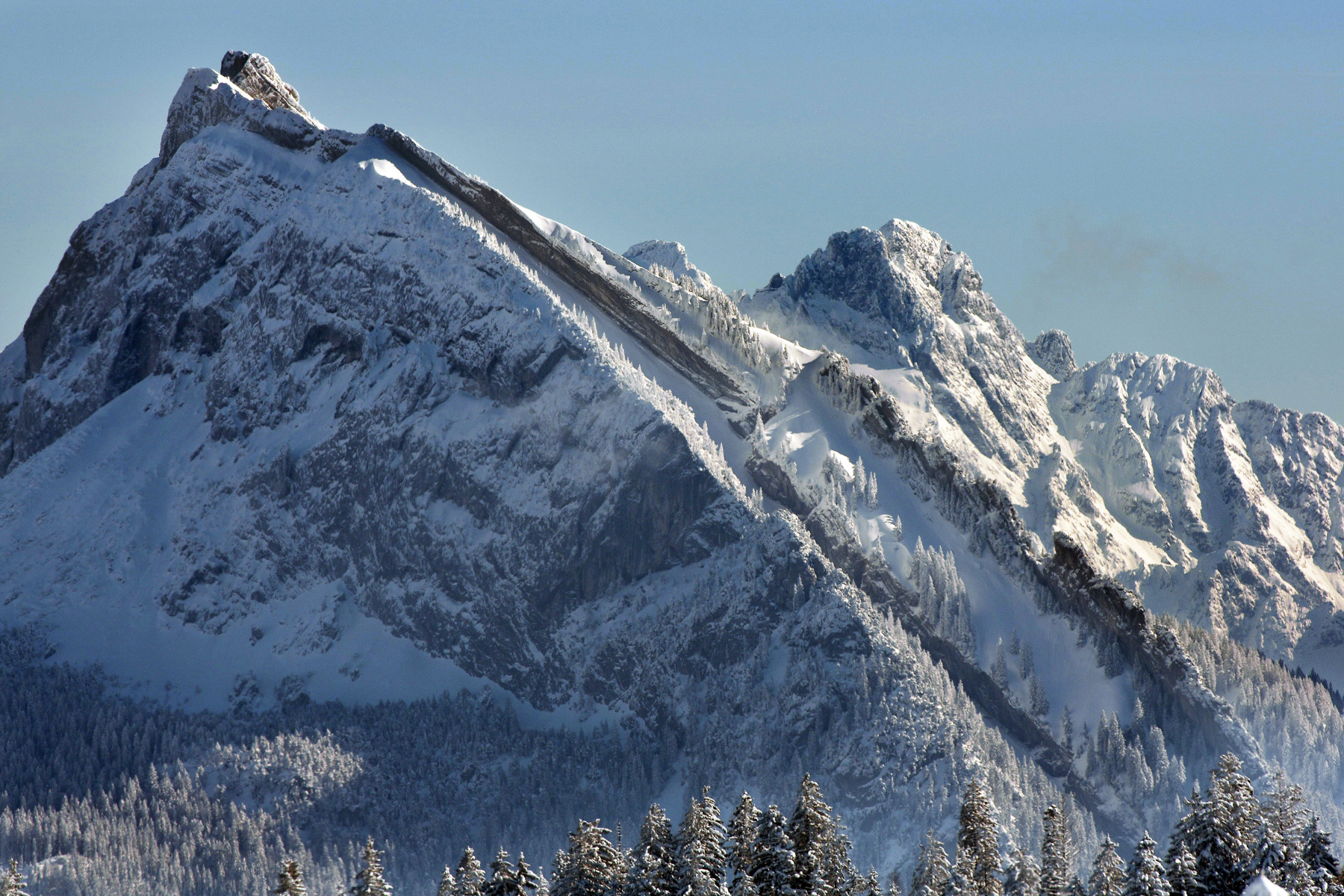
- View from the west side

Highest point
- Elevation: 1,896 m (6,220 ft)
- Prominence: 465 m (1,526 ft)
- Coordinates: 47°7′7″N 8°58′7″E

Geography
- Location within Switzerland Location within Canton of Glarus Location within Canton of Schwyz
- Country: Switzerland
- Cantons: Glarus / Schwyz
- Parent range: Schwyzer Alps

The Chöpfenberg (1,896 m [6,220 ft]) is a mountain of the Schwyzer Alps, located on the border between the Swiss cantons of Schwyz and Glarus, Switzerland. It lies on the range north of the Mutteristock, between the valleys of the Wägitalersee and the Linth.

== See also ==
- List of mountains of the canton of Glarus
- List of mountains of the canton of Schwyz
