= Fläschenspitz =

Mountain in Switzerland

- Location within Switzerland Location within Canton of Schwyz

Highest point
- Elevation: 2,073 m (6,801 ft)
- Prominence: 177 m (581 ft)
- Parent peak: Druesberg
- Coordinates: 47°01′42″N 8°52′18″E

Geography
- Country: Switzerland
- Canton: Schwyz
- Parent range: Schwyz Alps

The Fläschenspitz is a mountain of the Schwyz Alps, located south of Studen in the canton of Schwyz, Switzerland. It lies between the valleys of the river Sihl and the Lake Klöntal.

== See also ==
- List of mountains of the canton of Schwyz
