= Schijen (Schwyzer Alps) =

Mountain in Switzerland

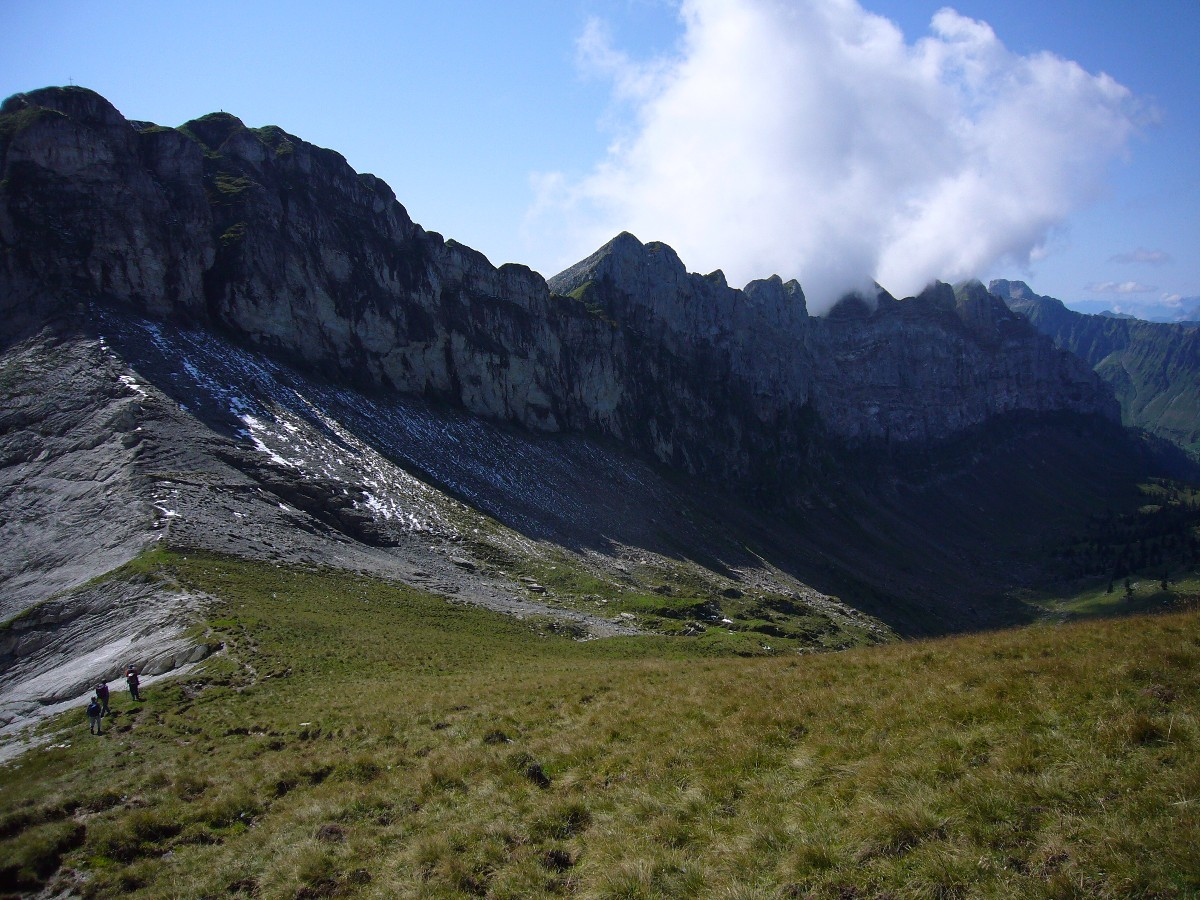
- The chain with the Wiggis (far-left) and Schijen (far-right), view from north

Highest point
- Elevation: 2,259 m (7,411 ft)
- Prominence: 120 m (390 ft)
- Parent peak: Rautispitz
- Coordinates: 47°03′33.5″N 8°59′30.6″E

Geography
- Location within Switzerland Location within Canton of Glarus
- Country: Switzerland
- Canton: Glarus
- Parent range: Schwyzer Alps

The Schijen is a mountain in the canton of Glarus in Switzerland, overlooking the two lakes Obersee and Klöntalersee on its northern and southern side, respectively. It lies west of the town of Glarus within the Schwyzer Alps.

== See also ==
- List of mountains of the canton of Glarus
