= Planggenstock =

Mountain in Switzerland

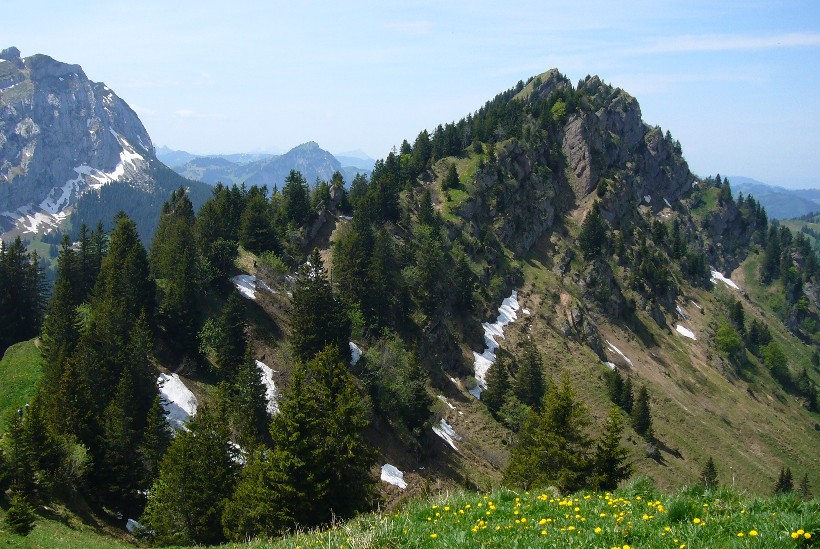
- View from the Hirzli (east side)

Highest point
- Elevation: 1,675 m (5,495 ft)
- Prominence: 251 m (823 ft)
- Parent peak: Chöpfenberg
- Coordinates: 47°07′59″N 8°59′37″E

Geography
- Location within Switzerland Location within Canton of Glarus
- Country: Switzerland
- Canton: Glarus
- Parent range: Schwyzer Alps

The Planggenstock (1,675 m [5,495 ft]) is a mountain of the Schwyzer Alps, located south of Bilten in the canton of Glarus. It lies between the valley of the Linth and the valley of Niederurnen.

== See also ==
- List of mountains of the canton of Glarus
