= Biet (mountain) =

Mountain in Switzerland

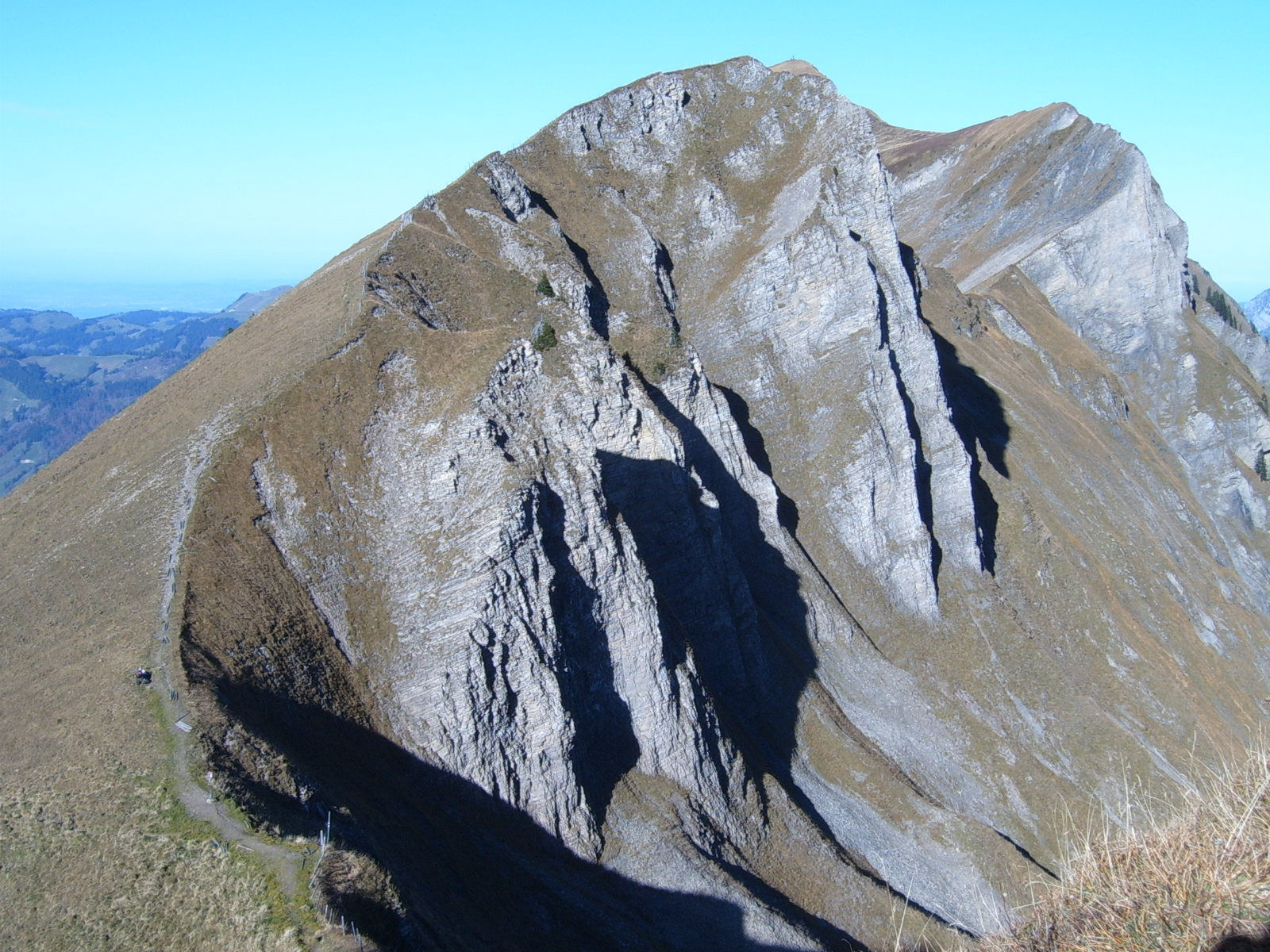
- View from the south

Highest point
- Elevation: 1,965 m (6,447 ft)
- Prominence: 185 m (607 ft)
- Parent peak: Druesberg
- Coordinates: 47°02′15″N 08°50′28″E

Geography
- Location within Switzerland Location within Canton of Schwyz
- Country: Switzerland
- Canton: Schwyz
- Parent range: Schwyzer Alps

Climbing
- Easiest route: Trail

The Biet (1,965 m [6,447 ft]) is a mountain of the Schwyzer Alps, located east of Oberiberg in the canton of Schwyz, Switzerland. It lies on the range north of the Druesberg.

== See also ==
- List of mountains of the canton of Schwyz
