= Schiberg =

Mountain in Switzerland

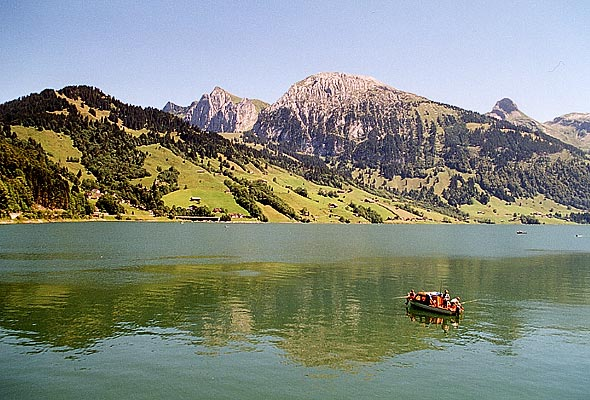
- The Schiberg (centre right) from the Wägitalersee

Highest point
- Elevation: 2,044 m (6,706 ft)
- Prominence: 144 m (472 ft)
- Parent peak: Brünnelistock
- Coordinates: 47°05′33″N 8°57′13″E

Geography
- Location within Switzerland Location within Canton of Glarus Location within Canton of Schwyz
- Country: Switzerland
- Cantons: Glarus / Schwyz
- Parent range: Schwyz Alps

The Schiberg (2,044 m [6,706 ft]) is a mountain of the Schwyz Alps, located on the border between the Swiss cantons of Schwyz and Glarus. It overlooks the Wägitalersee on its western side.

== See also ==
- List of mountains of the canton of Glarus
- List of mountains of the canton of Schwyz
