= Morgartenberg =

Mountain in Switzerland

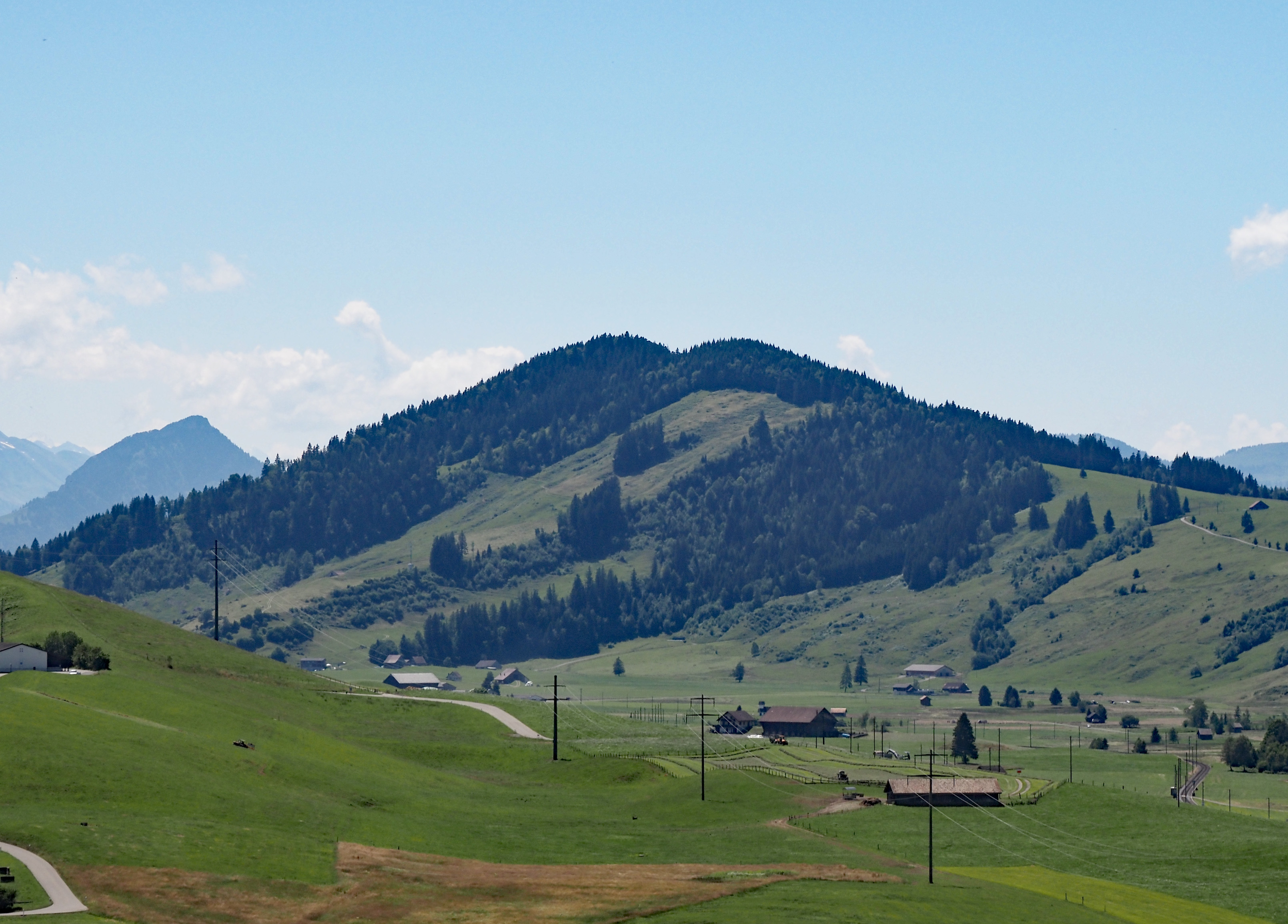

Highest point
- Elevation: 1,244 m (4,081 ft)
- Prominence: 312 m (1,024 ft)
- Coordinates: 47°05′59″N 8°39′19″E

Geography
- Location within Switzerland Location within Canton of Schwyz
- Country: Switzerland
- Canton: Schwyz
- Parent range: Schwyzer Alps

The Morgartenberg (1,244 m [4,081 ft]) is a mountain of the Schwyzer Alps, located west of Rothenthurm in the canton of Schwyz and overlooking Lake Ägeri on its west side. The border with the canton of Zug runs west of the mountain.

The monument to the battle of Morgarten is located in Morgarten at the foot of the mountain, near the lakeshore.

== See also ==
- List of mountains of the canton of Schwyz
