= Fronalpstock (Schwyz) =

Mountain in Switzerland

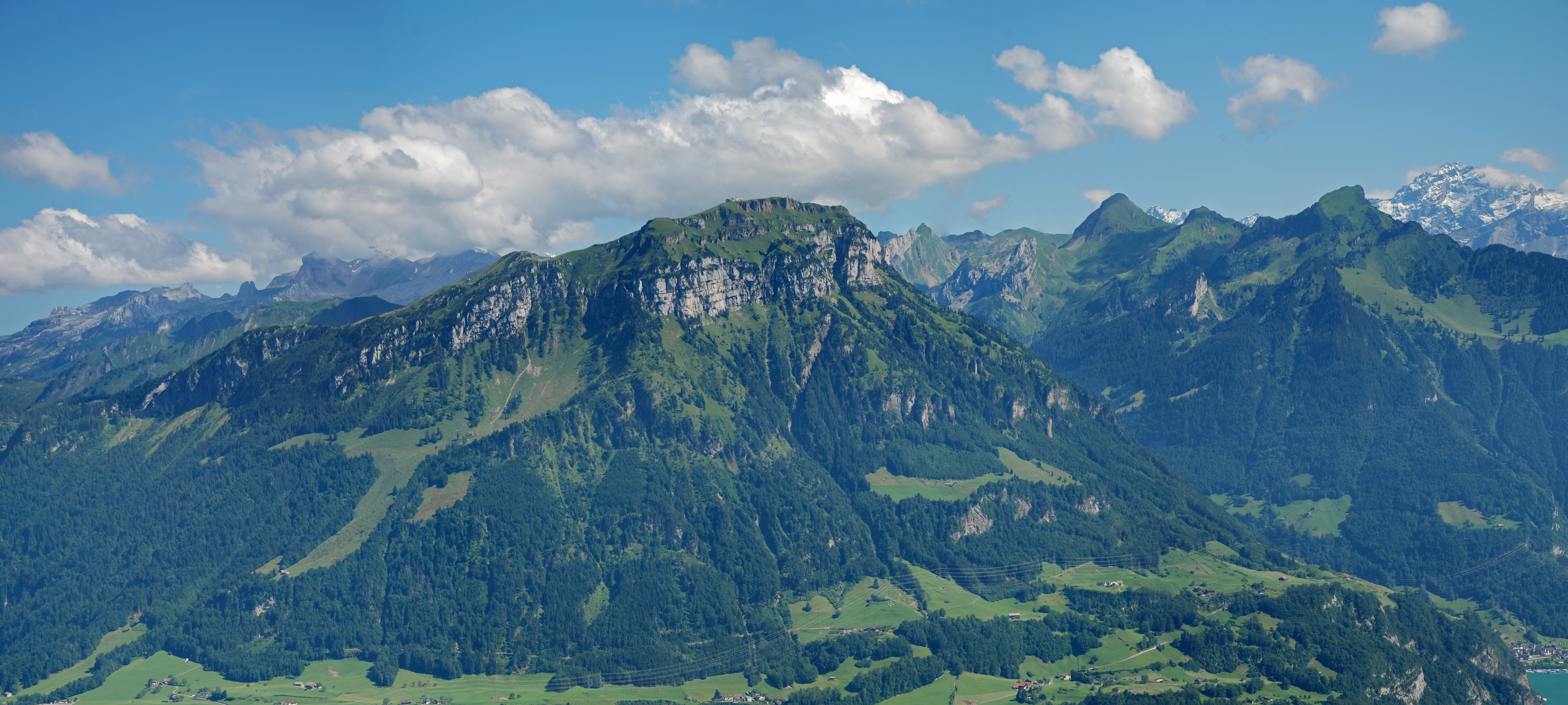
- View from Urmiberg (north side)

Highest point
- Elevation: 1,921 m (6,302 ft)
- Prominence: 189 m (620 ft)
- Parent peak: Chlingenstock
- Coordinates: 46°58′05.1″N 8°38′14.2″E

Geography
- Location within Switzerland Location within Canton of Schwyz
- Country: Switzerland
- Canton: Schwyz
- Parent range: Schwyzer Alps
- Topo map: Swiss Federal Office of Topography swisstopo

Climbing
- Easiest route: Cable car

The Fronalpstock is a mountain in Switzerland, in the Schwyzer Alps and the canton of Schwyz near the south-east corner of the Four Valley Lakes. It has an elevation of 1,921 metres (6,302 ft) above sea level. The summit is accessible by a chair lift from the village of Stoos.

== Gallery ==
Aerial views of Fronalpstock

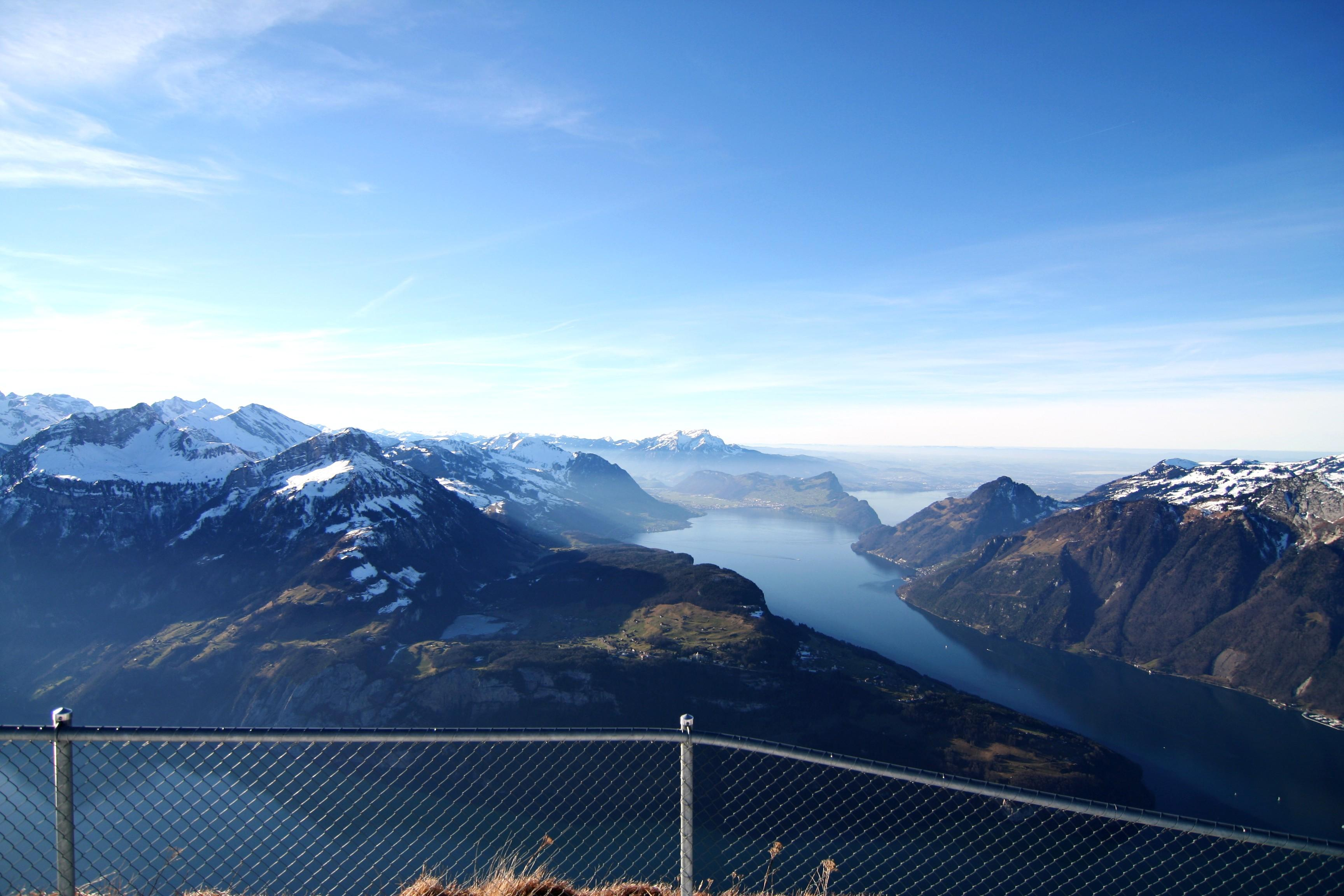
View from the summit

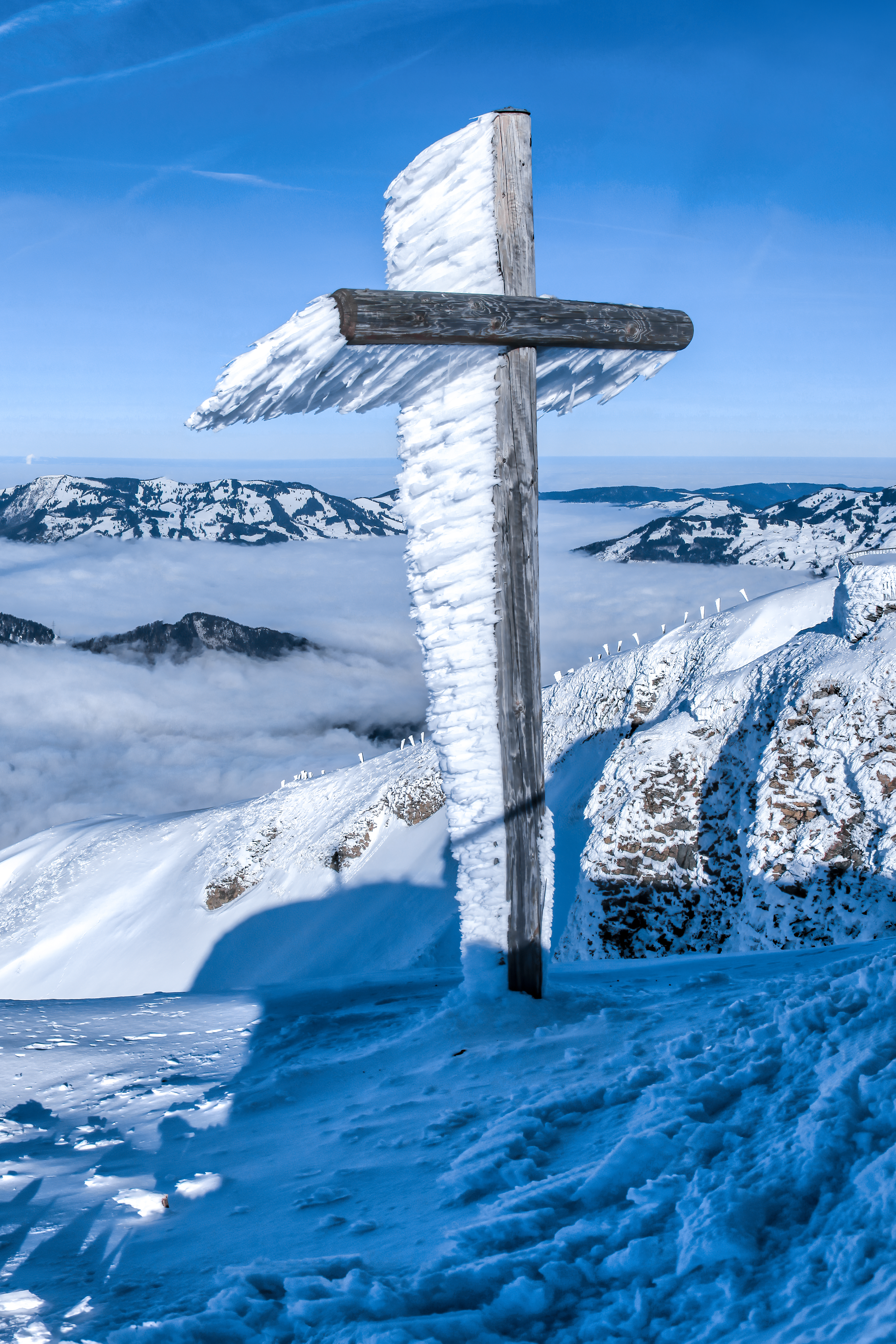
Rime ice formed on the summit cross

== See also ==
- List of mountains of Switzerland accessible by public transport
- List of mountains of the canton of Schwyz
