= List of mountains of the canton of Schwyz =

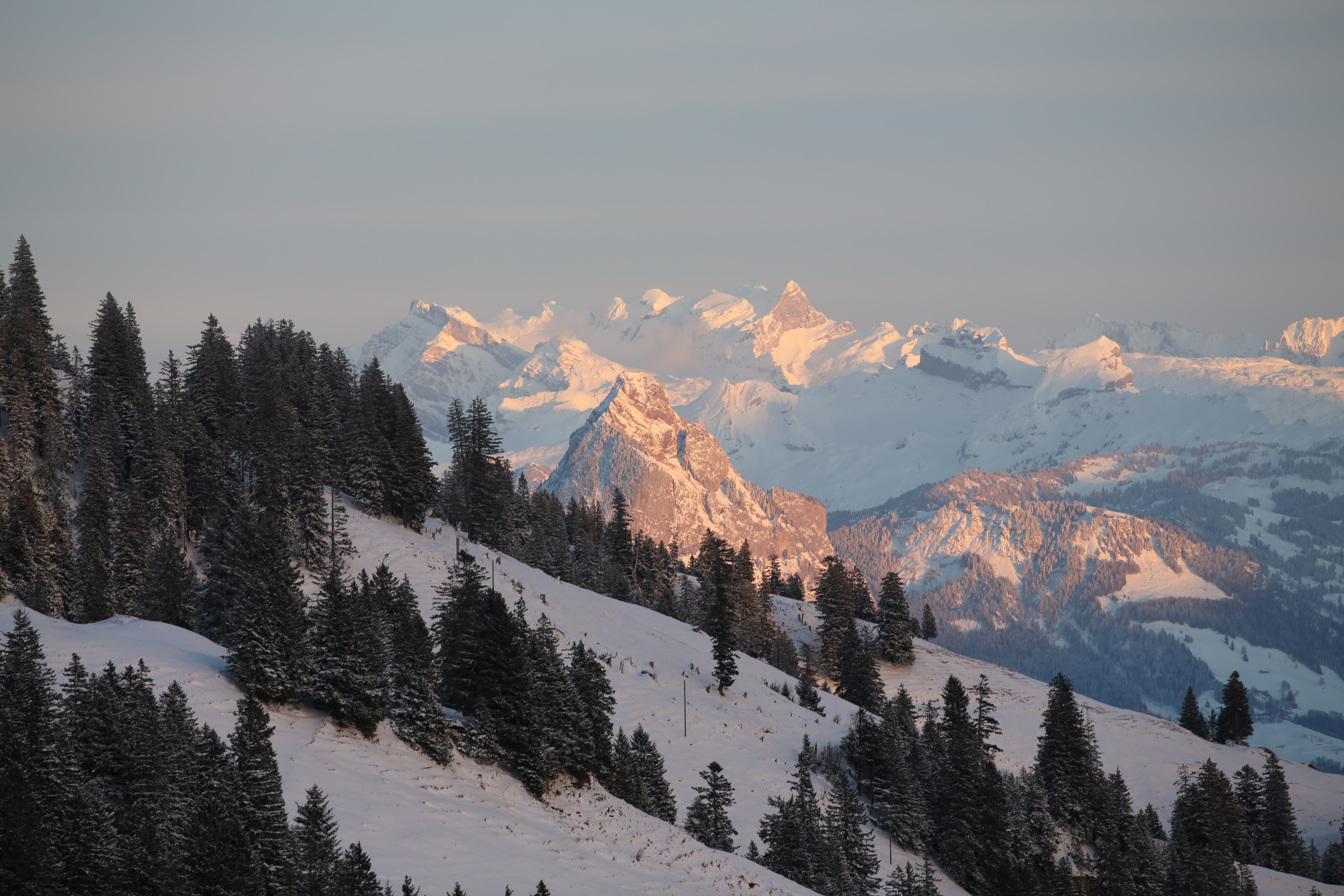
The Grosser Mythen (center) and Bös Fulen (background), as seen from the Rigi.

This is a list of mountains of the Swiss canton of Schwyz. Schwyz is a mountainous canton and lies almost entirely within the Alps. It is also one of the 15 cantons having summits above 2,000 metres (6,600 ft). Topographically, the two most important summits of the canton are those of the Bös Fulen (most elevated) and the Rigi (most prominent and isolated). Most of the mountains of the canton are part of the Schwyzer Alps mountain range, although not all the mountains of that range lie within the canton. Some mountains are located within the Glarus Alps.

All mountain heights and prominences on the list are from the largest-scale maps available.

== Topographic prominence of 150 metres or more ==
This list only includes significant summits with a topographic prominence of at least 150 metres (492 ft). There are 38 such summits in the canton of Schwyz and they are found in almost all its districts.

Mountain	Height (m)	Drop (m)	Coordinates	Range	District(s)	First ascent	Notes
Bös Fulen	2802	367	46°58′02″N 08°56′45″E	Schwyzer Alps	Schwyz		Summit located on the border with the canton of Glarus
Ortstock	2716	538	46°55′31″N 08°56′53″E	Schwyzer Alps	Schwyz		Summit located on the border with the canton of Glarus
Höch Turm	2666	264	46°55′56″N 08°56′09″E	Schwyzer Alps	Schwyz		
Pfannenstock	2573	373	46°57′42″N 08°54′41″E	Schwyzer Alps	Schwyz		
Chaiserstock	2515	470	46°55′42″N 08°43′43″E	Schwyzer Alps	Schwyz		Summit located on the border with the canton of Uri
Fulen	2491	311	46°55′07″N 08°42′53″E	Schwyzer Alps	Schwyz		Summit located on the border with the canton of Uri
Rossstock	2461	173	46°55′02″N 08°42′28″E	Schwyzer Alps	Schwyz		Summit located on the border with the canton of Uri
Chratzerengrat	2349	208	46°58′17″N 08°54′05″E	Glarus Alps	Schwyz		
Wasserbergfirst	2341	325	46°56′22″N 08°47′21″E	Schwyzer Alps	Schwyz		
Silberen	2319	199	46°59′32″N 08°53′58″E	Schwyzer Alps	Schwyz		
Mutteristock (Redertenstock)	2295	745	47°02′54″N 08°56′35″E	Schwyzer Alps	March		Summit located on the border with the canton of Glarus
Druesberg	2282	722	46°00′15″N 08°50′00″E	Schwyzer Alps	Schwyz		
Brünnelistock	2133	250	47°05′03″N 08°58′21″E	Schwyzer Alps	March		Summit located on the border with the canton of Glarus
Zindlenspitz	2097	195	47°04′35″N 08°57′36″E	Schwyzer Alps	March		Summit located on the border with the canton of Glarus
Fluebrig	2092	268	47°03′41″N 08°53′00″E	Schwyzer Alps	March/Schwyz		
Fläschenspitz	2073	177	47°01′42″N 08°52′18″E	Schwyzer Alps	March/Schwyz		
Biet	1965	185	47°02′15″N 08°50′28″E	Schwyzer Alps	Schwyz		
Chlingenstock	1935	448	46°57′26″N 08°40′29″E	Schwyzer Alps	Schwyz		
Fronalpstock	1921	189	46°58′05″N 08°38′14″E	Schwyzer Alps	Schwyz		
Grosser Mythen	1898	493	47°01′47″N 08°41′20″E	Schwyzer Alps	Schwyz		
Chöpfenberg	1896	465	47°07′07″N 08°58′07″E	Schwyzer Alps	March		Summit located on the border with the canton of Glarus
Kleiner Mythen	1811	373	47°02′27″N 08°41′03″E	Schwyzer Alps	Schwyz		
Rigi (Kulm)	1798	1290	47°03′24″N 08°29′08″E	Schwyzer Alps	Küssnacht/Schwyz		Mountain is partly located in the canton of Lucerne, but the summit lies in the canton of Schwyz
Roggenstock	1778	296	47°01′24″N 08°47′23″E	Schwyzer Alps	Schwyz		
Rigi Hochflue	1698	508	47°00′36″N 08°33′36″E	Schwyzer Alps	Gersau/Schwyz		
Gross Aubrig	1695	327	47°06′41″N 08°52′57″E	Schwyzer Alps	March		
Dosse	1684	252	47°01′37″N 08°29′56″E	Schwyzer Alps	Schwyz		Summit located on the border with the canton of Lucerne
Furggelenstock	1656	250	47°02′19″N 08°43′59″E	Schwyzer Alps	Schwyz		
Chli Aubrig	1642	201	47°06′27″N 08°51′44″E	Schwyzer Alps	March		
Rossberg (Wildspitz)	1580	780	47°05′03″N 08°34′40″E	Schwyzer Alps	Schwyz		Summit located on the border with the canton of Zug
Hochstuckli	1566	156	47°03′28″N 08°40′11″E	Schwyzer Alps	Schwyz		
Morgartenberg	1244	312	47°05′59″N 08°39′19″E	Schwyzer Alps	Schwyz		
Buechberg	631	202	47°12′05″N 08°54′32″E		March		

== Topographic prominence of less than 150 metres ==
Mountain	Height (m)	Drop (m)	Coordinates	Range	District(s)	First ascent	Notes
Schijen	2610	110	46°55′11″N 8°56′06″E	Glarus Alps	Schwyz		Summit located on the tripoint with the cantons of Glarus and Uri
Hinterer Eggstock	2455	91	46°57′37″N 8°58′0″E	Schwyzer Alps	Schwyz		Summit located on the border with the canton of Glarus
Schiberg	2044	144	47°05′33″N 8°57′13″E	Schwyzer Alps	March		Summit located on the border with the canton of Glarus
Scheidegg	1659	114	47°01′39″N 08°31′12″E	Schwyzer Alps	Gersau/Schwyz		
Rotenfluh	1571	144	47°01′16″N 08°42′11″E	Schwyzer Alps	Schwyz		
Etzel	1098	148	47°10′40″N 08°46′03″E	Schwyzer Alps	Höfe/Einsiedeln		

== See also ==
- List of mountains of Switzerland
- Swiss Alps
