= Rautispitz =

Mountain in Switzerland

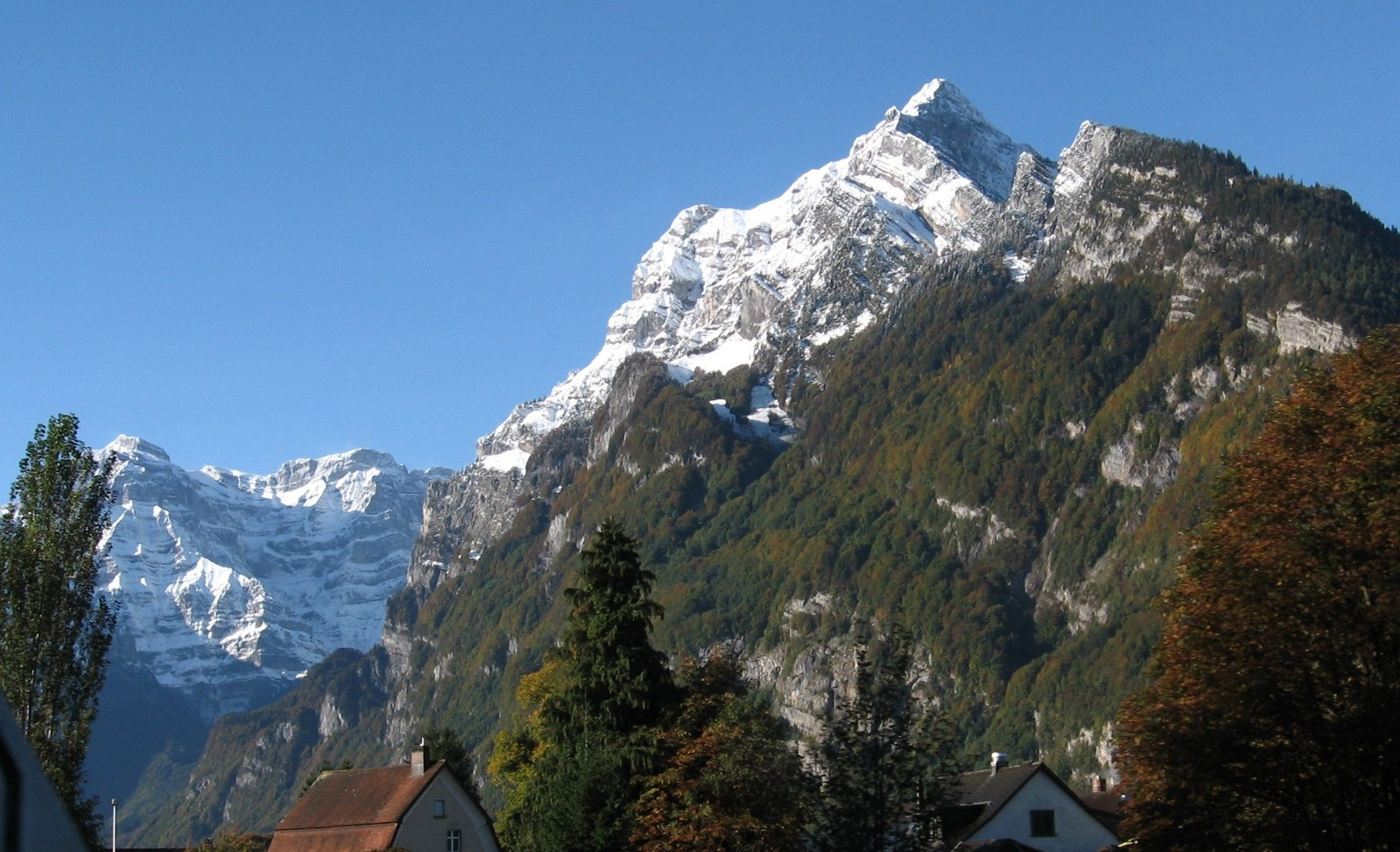
- The Rautispitz from Näfels (Glärnisch in background)

Highest point
- Elevation: 2,283 m (7,490 ft)
- Prominence: 465 m (1,526 ft)
- Parent peak: Mutteristock
- Coordinates: 47°04′16.1″N 9°01′41.6″E

Geography
- Location within Switzerland Location within Canton of Glarus
- Country: Switzerland
- Canton: Glarus
- Parent range: Schwyzer Alps

The Rautispitz is a mountain of the Schwyzer Alps, overlooking Netstal in the canton of Glarus, Switzerland. It lies between the lakes Obersee and the Klöntalersee and culminates at 2,283 metres (7,490 ft) above sea level. Its summit is generally accessed from the west side, with several trails starting at the Obersee.

== See also ==
- List of mountains of the canton of Glarus
