= Fulen (Schwyz Alps) =

Mountain in Switzerland

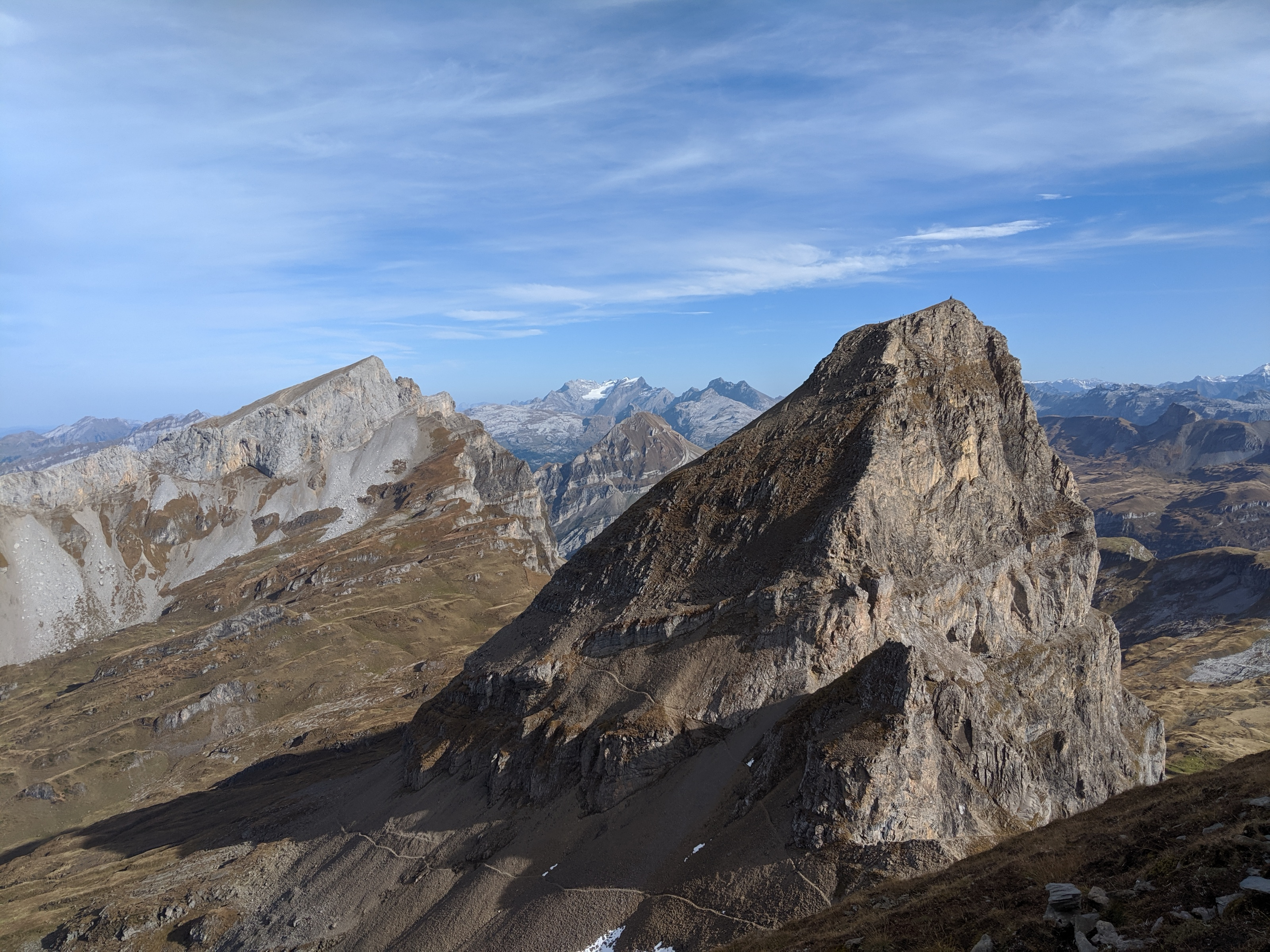
- Chaiserstock (left) and Fulen (right) from the Rossstock

Highest point
- Elevation: 2,490 m (8,170 ft)
- Prominence: 313 m (1,027 ft)
- Parent peak: Chaiserstock
- Coordinates: 46°55′7″N 8°42′53″E

Geography
- Location within Switzerland Location within Canton of Schwyz Location within Canton of Uri
- Country: Switzerland
- Cantons: Schwyz and Uri
- Parent range: Schwyz Alps
- Topo map: Swiss Federal Office of Topography swisstopo

The Fulen (2,490 m [8,170 ft]) is a mountain peak of the Schwyz Alps, located on the border between the Swiss cantons of Schwyz and Uri. It lies on the range between Muotathal and Unterschächen, east of Lake Lucerne.

== See also ==
- List of mountains of the canton of Schwyz
- List of mountains of Uri
