= Mutteristock =

Mountain in Switzerland

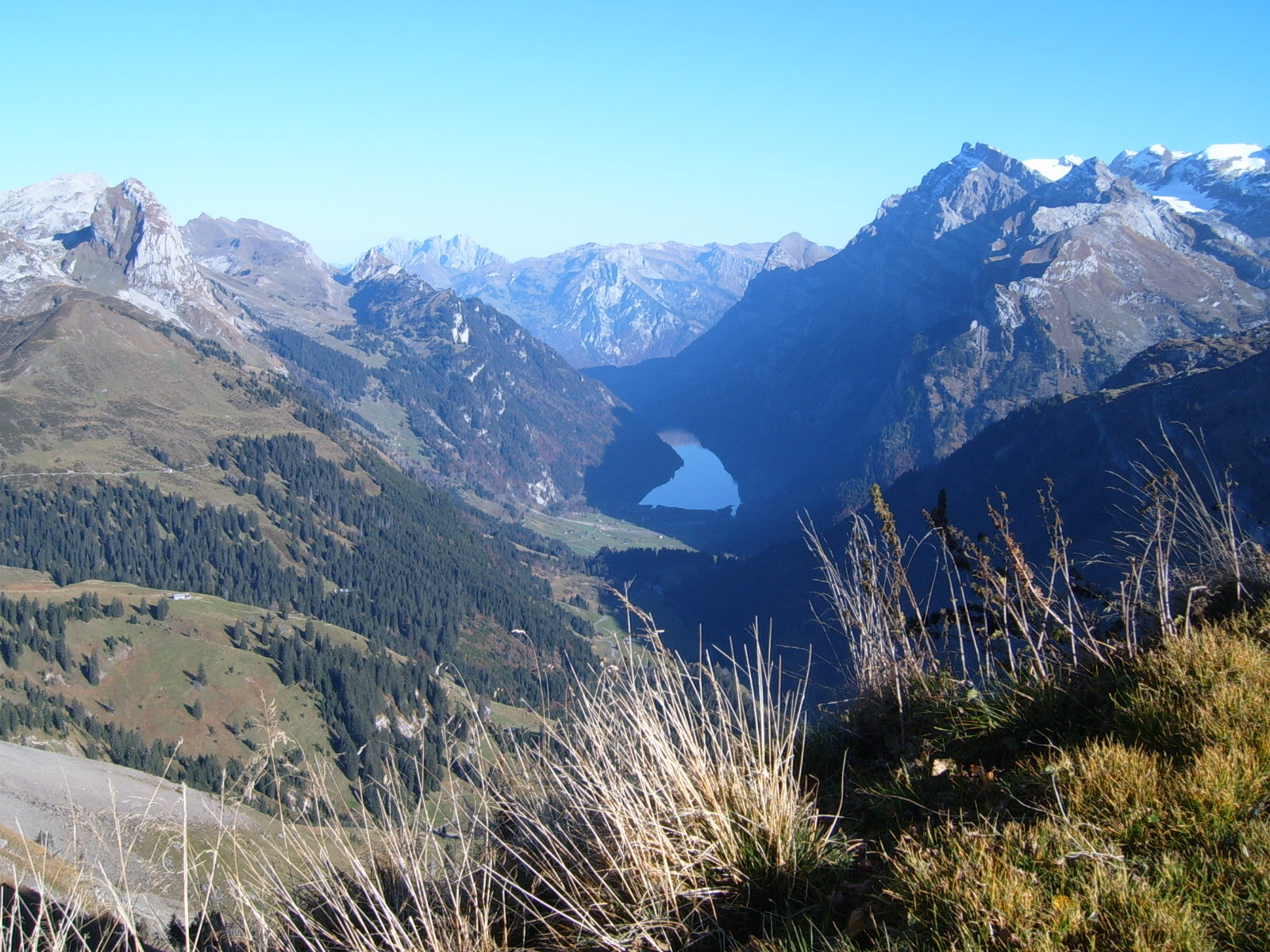
- The Mutteristock (left) and the valley of Klöntal

Highest point
- Elevation: 2,294 m (7,526 ft)
- Prominence: 745 m (2,444 ft)
- Coordinates: 47°2′54.3″N 8°56′34.9″E

Geography
- Location within Switzerland Location within Canton of Glarus Location within Canton of Schwyz
- Country: Switzerland
- Canton: Glarus /Schwyz
- Parent range: Schwyzer Alps

The Mutteristock is a mountain in the Schwyzer Alps, which rises 2,294 metres (7,526 ft) above sea level. It is located between the cantons of Glarus and Schwyz, Switzerland, overlooking the Wägitalersee and the Klöntalersee on its northern and southern side respectively. Its summit is the highest point of the subrange lying north of Pragel Pass. The mountain's slopes display bare limestone.

== See also ==
- List of mountains of the canton of Glarus
- List of mountains of the canton of Schwyz
