= Schwyz Alps =

Mountain range of the Alps in Schwyz Canton, Switzerland

Coordinates: 47.0°N 8.8°E

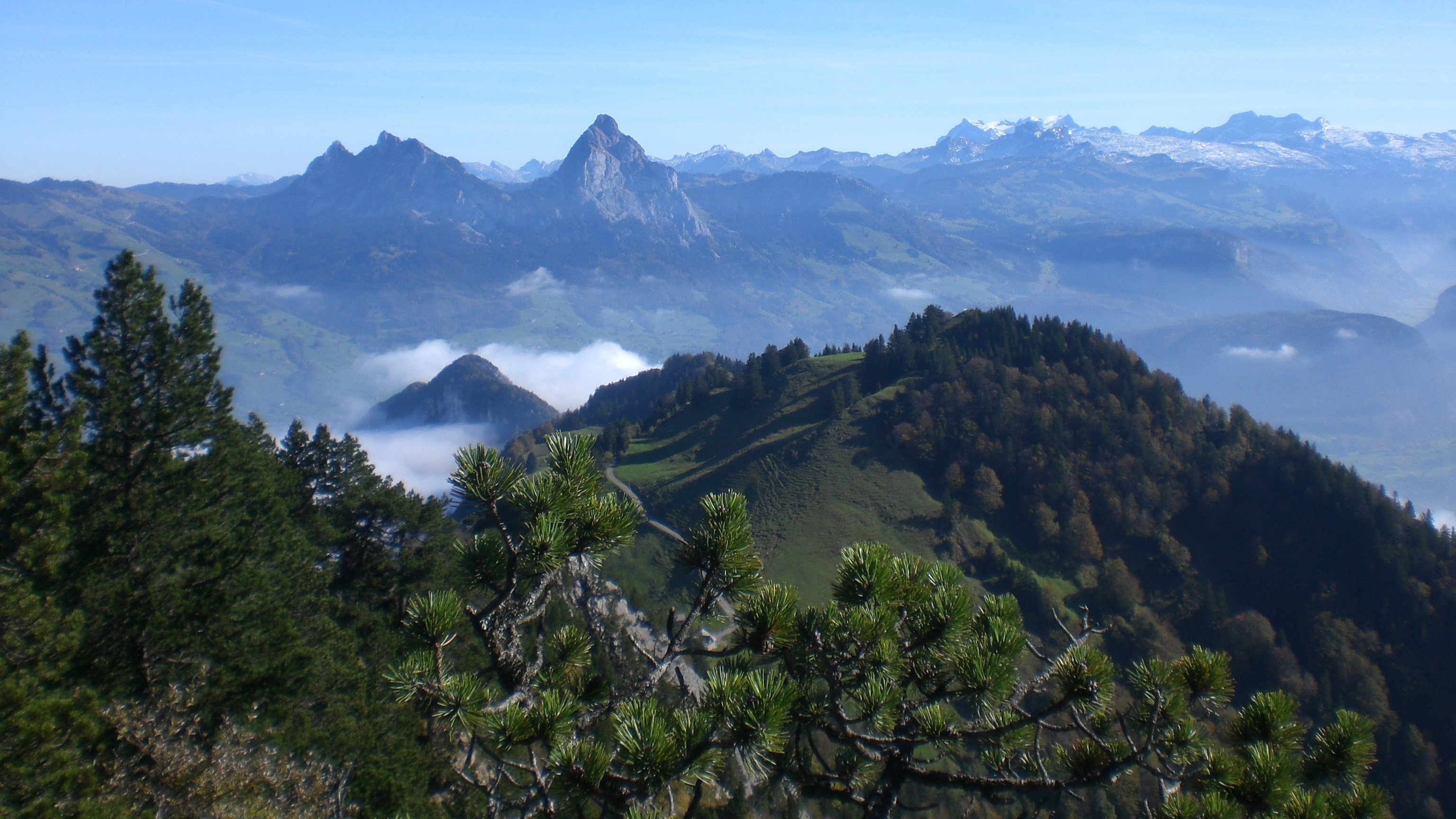
- View from Rigi Hochflue towards the Mythen and Glärnisch

Highest point
- Peak: Glärnisch
- Elevation: 2,915 m (9,564 ft)

Naming
- Native name: Schwyzer Alpen (German)

Geography
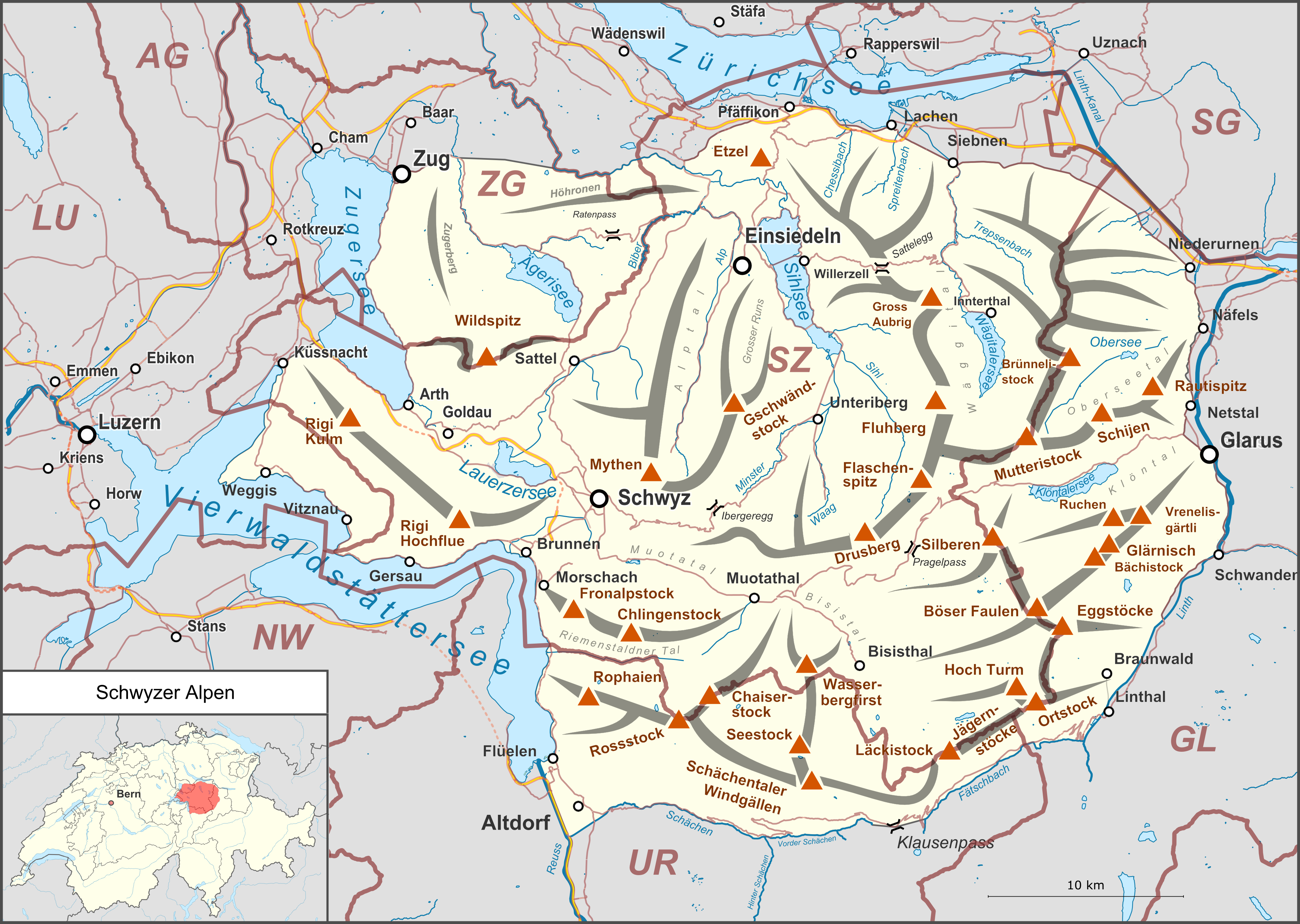
- Country: Switzerland
- Cantons: Schwyz, Zug, Glarus, Uri and Luzern
- Parent range: Western Alps
- Borders on: Glarus Alps, Uri Alps and Emmental Alps
- Topo map: Swiss Federal Office of Topography swisstopo

The Schwyz Alps (German: Schwyzer Alpen) are a mountain range in Switzerland. They form part of the North-Eastern Swiss Alps and are bordered by the Glarus Alps to the east, the Appenzell Alps to the north-east, the Emmental Alps in the west, and the Uri Alps to the south-west. The Klausen Pass is the highest point between the Schwyz Alps and the Glarus Alps.

The Schwyzer Alps extend beyond the boundaries of the canton of Schwyz, including parts of the cantons of Glarus, Luzern, Uri and Zug. The highest point in the Schwyzer Alps is the Glärnisch, at an elevation of 2,915 metres (9,564 ft), which actually lies within the canton of Glarus. Just south of the Glärnisch is the Bös Fulen, the highest point in the canton of Schwyz.

== Geography ==
=== Principal summits ===
The principal summits of the Schwyzer Alps are:

Name	Elevation (m)	Elevation (ft)	Prominence (m)	Prominence (ft)
Glärnisch	2,915	9,564	967	3,173
Bös Fulen	2,802	9,193	368	1,207
Schächentaler Windgällen	2,764	9,068	691	2,267
Ortstock	2,717	8,914	539	1,768
Höch Turm	2,666	8,747	264	866
Rüchigrat	2,657	8,717	222	728
Pfannenstock	2,573	8,442	373	1,224
Chaiserstock	2,515	8,251	470	1,540
Fulen	2,491	8,173	311	1,020
Rossstock	2,461	8,074	173	568
Wasserbergfirst	2,341	7,680	325	1,066
Mutteristock	2,295	7,530	745	2,444
Rautispitz	2,283	7,490	465	1,526
Druesberg	2,282	7,487	722	2,369
Schijen	2,259	7,411		
Brünnelistock	2,133	6,998	250	820
Zindlenspitz	2,097	6,880	195	640
Diethelm (Fluebrig)	2,092	6,864	268	879
Fläschenspitz	2,073	6,801	177	581
Schiberg	2,044	6,706	144	472
Biet	1,965	6,447	185	607
Chlingenstock	1,935	6,348	448	1,470
Fronalpstock	1,921	6,302	189	620
Grosser Mythen	1,898	6,227	493	1,617
Chöpfenberg	1,896	6,220	465	1,526
Kleiner Mythen	1,811	5,942	373	1,224
Rigi Kulm	1,798	5,899	1,290	4,230
Roggenstock	1,778	5,833	296	971
Rigi Hochflue	1,698	5,571	508	1,667
Gross Aubrig	1,695	5,561	327	1,073
Dosse	1,684	5,525	253	830
Planggenstock	1,675	5,495	251	823
Scheidegg	1,658	5,440	113	371
Wildspitz (Rossberg)	1,580	5,180	780	2,560
Morgartenberg	1,244	4,081	312	1,024
Etzel	1,098	3,602	148	486

== See also ==
- Swiss Alps
- List of mountains of the canton of Schwyz
- List of mountains of the canton of Glarus
- List of mountains of Uri
