= Chaiserstock =

Mountain in Switzerland

- Kaiserstock
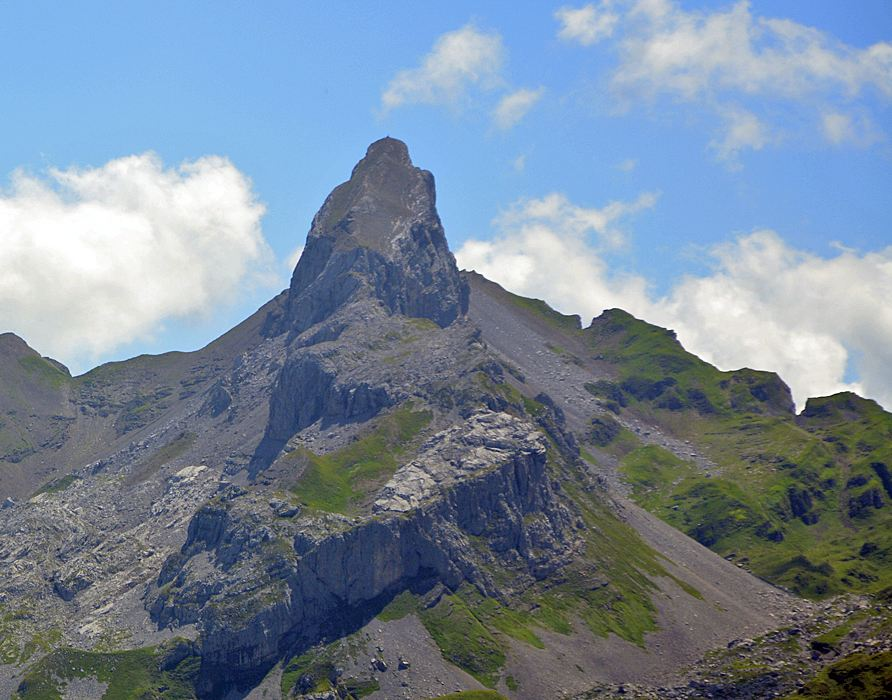

Highest point
- Elevation: 2,514 m (8,248 ft)
- Prominence: 469 m (1,539 ft)
- Parent peak: Höch Windgällen
- Coordinates: 46°55′42″N 8°43′42″E

Geography
- Location within Switzerland Location within Canton of Schwyz Location within Canton of Uri
- Country: Switzerland
- Cantons: Schwyz and Uri
- Parent range: Schwyzer Alps
- Topo map: Swiss Federal Office of Topography swisstopo

The Chaiserstock, also spelled Kaiserstock, is a mountain of the Schwyzer Alps, located on the border between the Swiss cantons of Schwyz and Uri. Its summit lies at 2,514 m (8,248 ft), on the range between Muotathal and Unterschächen, east of Lake Lucerne.

== See also ==
- List of mountains of the canton of Schwyz
- List of mountains of Uri
