= Rossstock =

Mountain in Switzerland

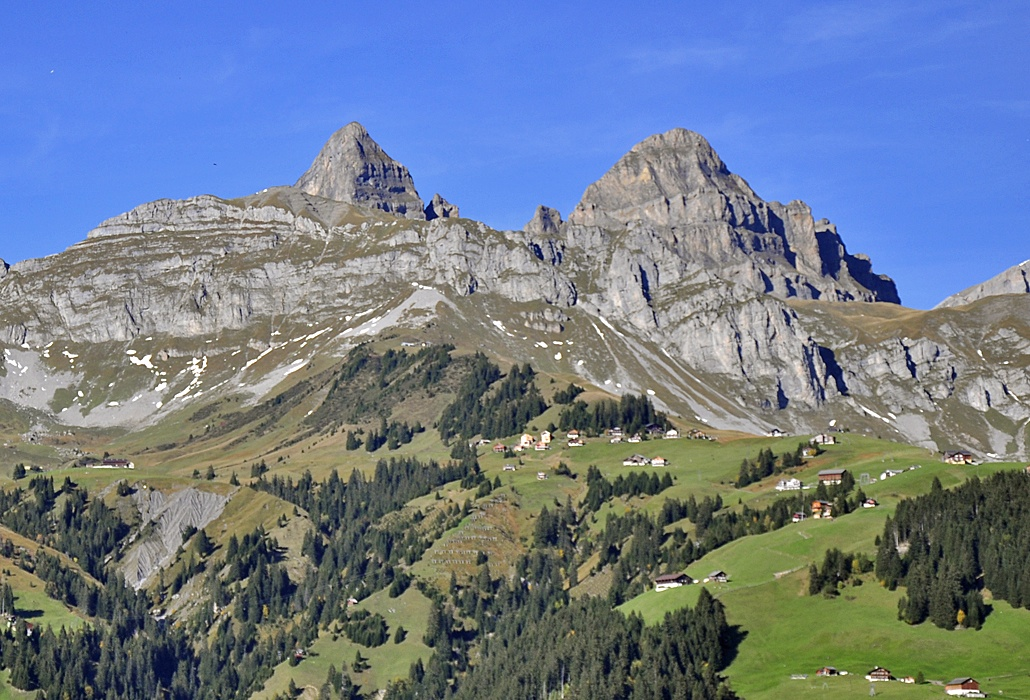
- The Rossstock (left) and the Fulen (right) seen from the south

Highest point
- Elevation: 2,460 m (8,070 ft)
- Prominence: 174 m (571 ft)
- Parent peak: Fulen
- Coordinates: 46°55′1.5″N 8°42′28″E

Geography
- Location within Switzerland Location within Canton of Schwyz Location within Canton of Uri
- Country: Switzerland
- Cantons: Schwyz and Uri
- Parent range: Schwyzer Alps
- Topo map: Swiss Federal Office of Topography swisstopo

The Rossstock (2,460 m [8,070 ft]) is a mountain of the Schwyzer Alps, located on the border between the Swiss cantons of Schwyz and Uri. It lies on the range between Muotathal and Unterschächen, east of Lake Lucerne.

== See also ==
- List of mountains of the canton of Schwyz
- List of mountains of Uri
