= Klingenstock =

Mountain in Switzerland

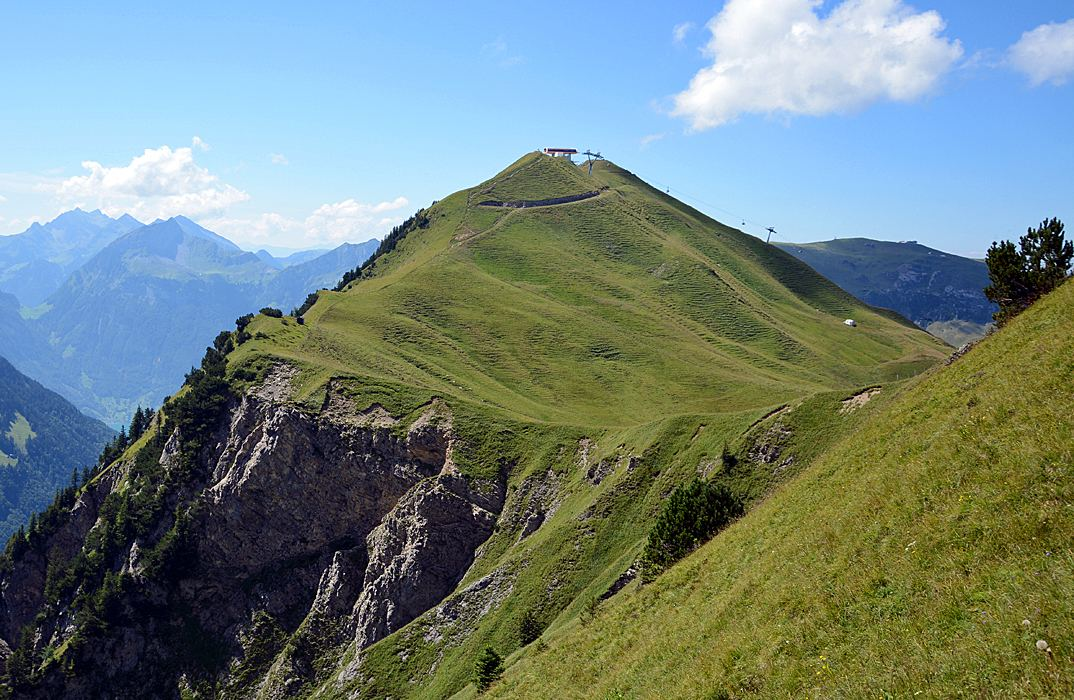

Highest point
- Elevation: 1,935 m (6,348 ft)
- Prominence: 448 m (1,470 ft)
- Coordinates: 46°57′26″N 8°40′29″E

Geography
- Location within Switzerland Location within Canton of Schwyz
- Country: Switzerland
- Canton: Schwyz
- Parent range: Schwyzer Alps

Climbing
- Easiest route: Trail

The Klingenstock, also spelled Chlingenstock, is a mountain of the Schwyzer Alps, located between Stoos and Riemenstalden in the canton of Schwyz, Switzerland.

Its summit is accessible by chair lift from Stoos.

== See also ==
- List of mountains of Switzerland accessible by public transport
- List of mountains of the canton of Schwyz
