= Druesberg =

Mountain in Switzerland

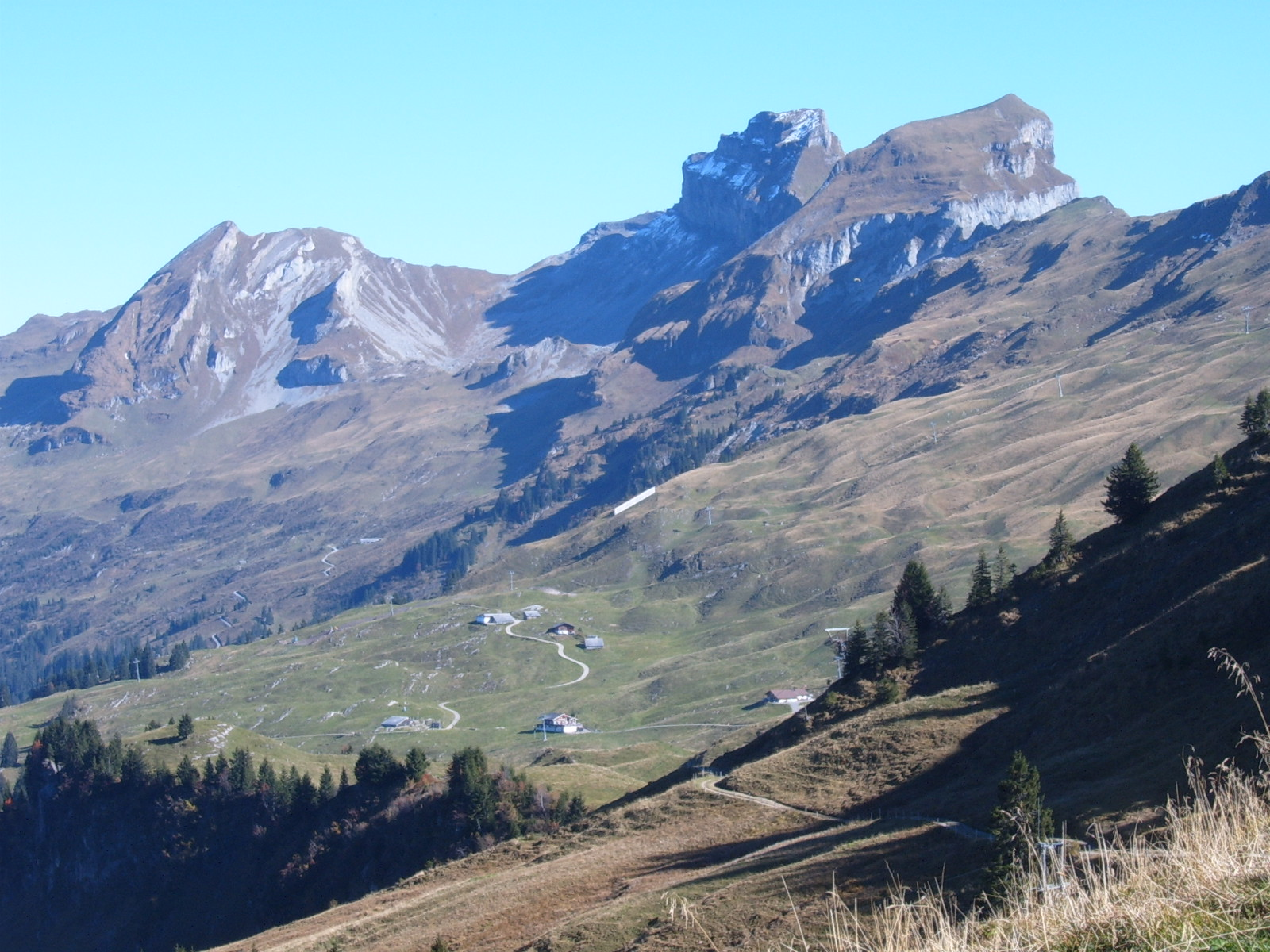
- Druesberg with Twäriberg and Forstberg

Highest point
- Elevation: 2,282 m (7,487 ft)
- Prominence: 722 m (2,369 ft)
- Parent peak: Mutteristock
- Coordinates: 47°0′15″N 8°50′0″E

Geography
- Location within Switzerland Location within Canton of Schwyz
- Country: Switzerland
- Canton: Schwyz
- Parent range: Schwyzer Alps

Climbing
- Easiest route: Trail

The Druesberg, or Drusberg, is a mountain located north of Pragel Pass in the Schwyzer Alps and the canton of Schwyz, Switzerland. It lies on the range between Unteriberg and Muotathal.

The skiing and hiking area Hoch-Ybrig lies to the north-west of the mountain summit, on the slopes into the valleys of the Minster and Waag rivers. To the north-east, the mountain is drained by the upper reaches of the Sihl, which eventually flows to the centre of the city of Zurich.

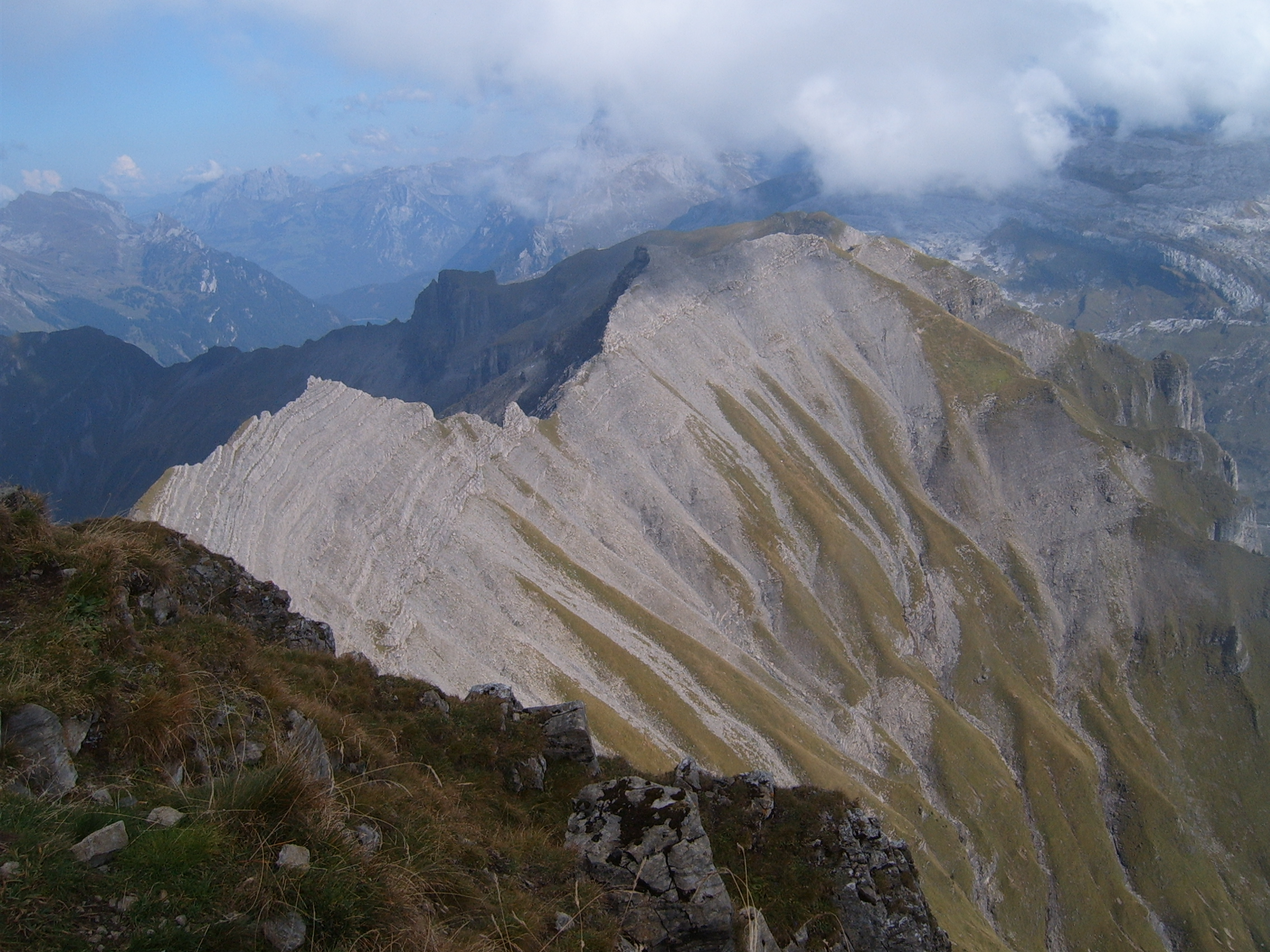

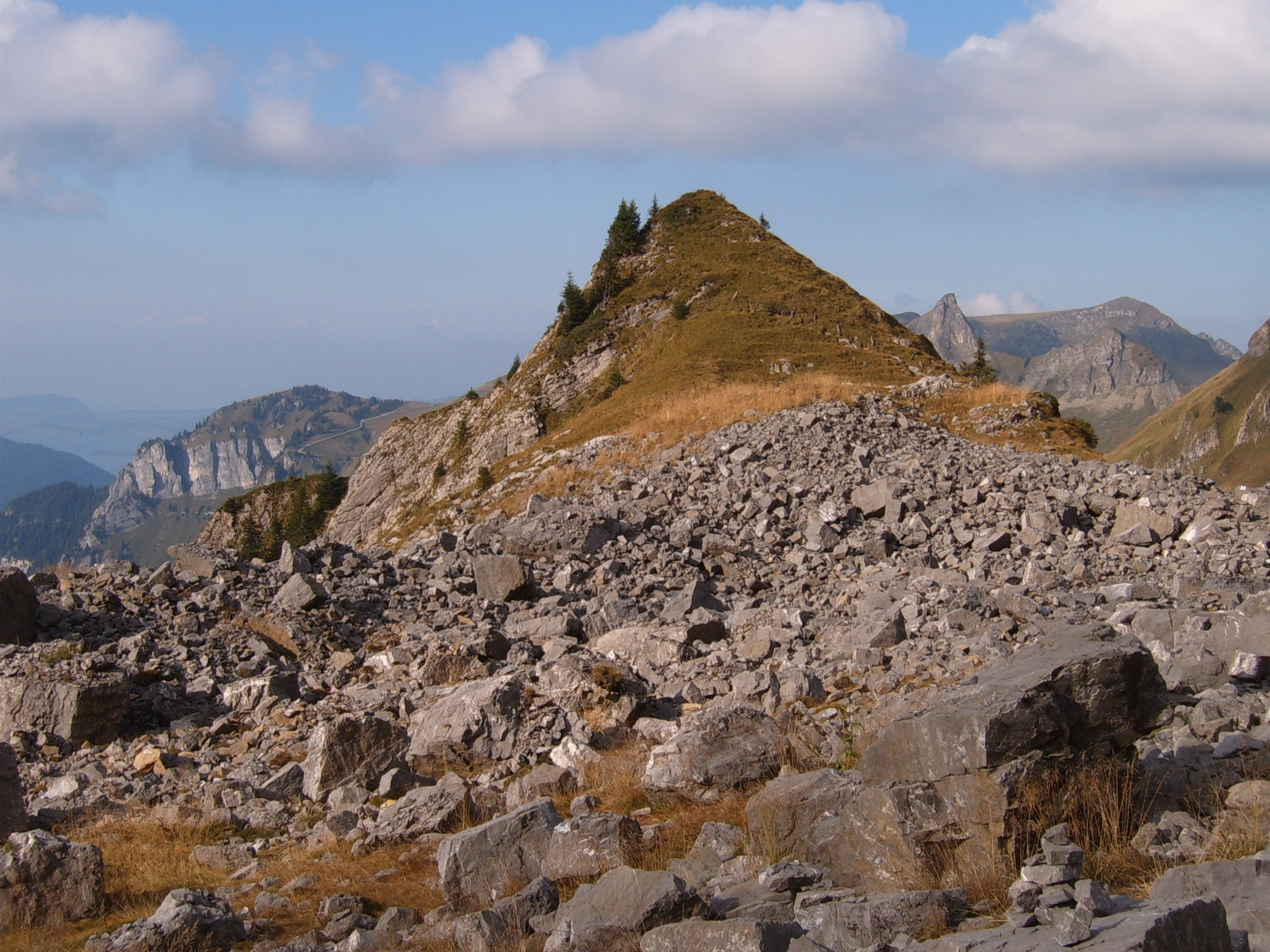

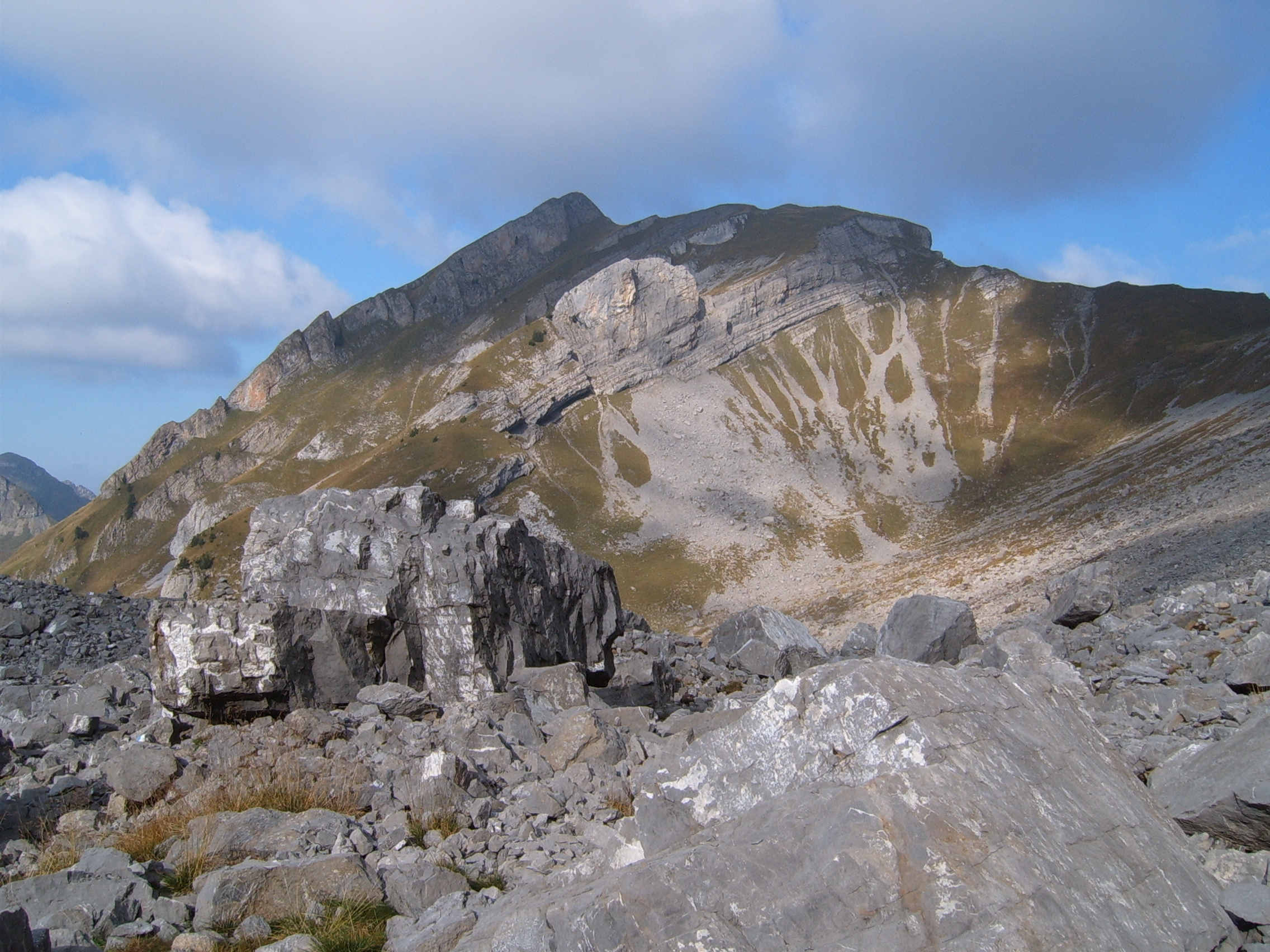

== See also ==
- List of mountains of the canton of Schwyz
