= Wägitalersee =

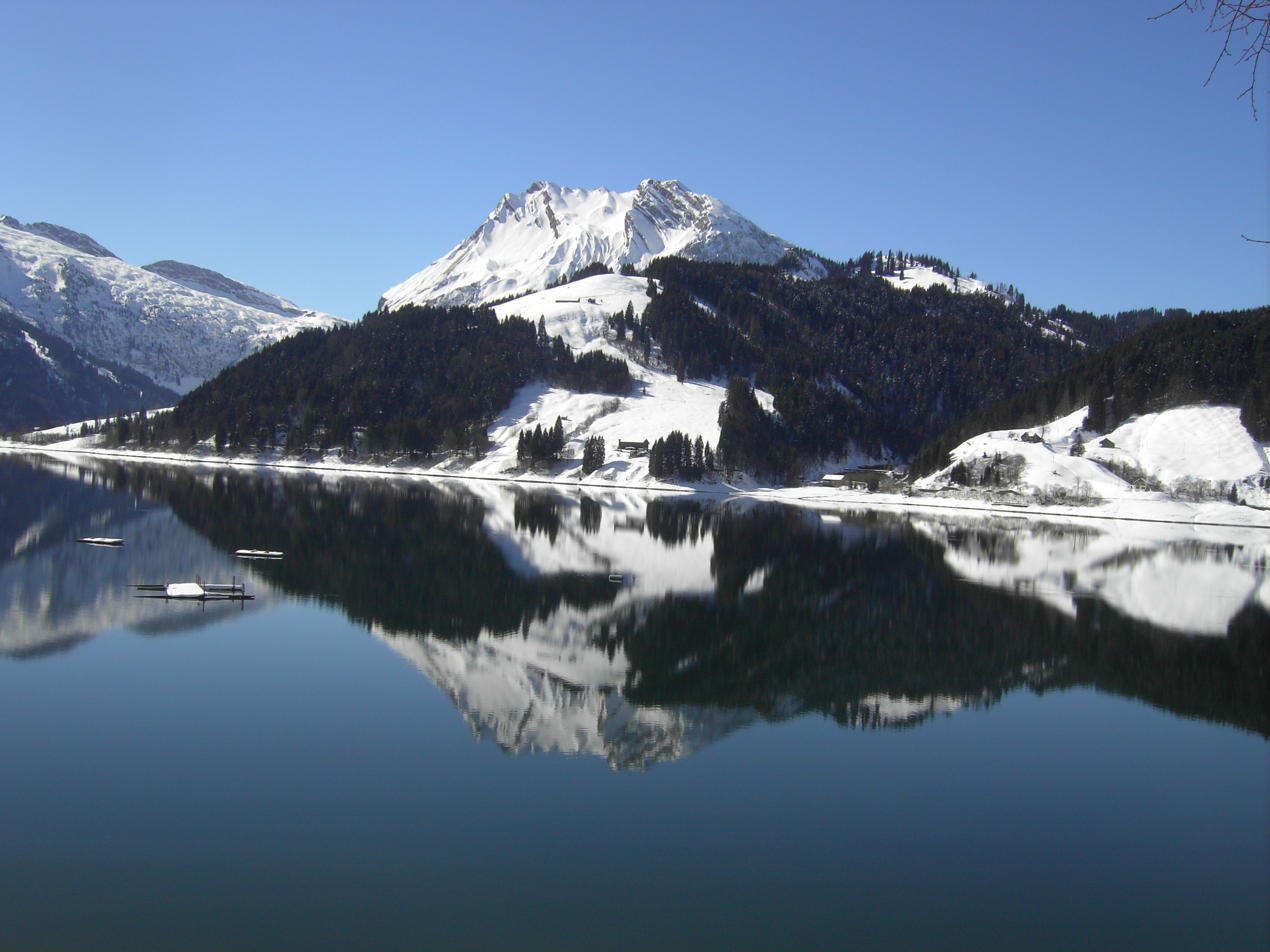

- Location within Canton of Schwyz Location within Switzerland Location within Alps
- Interactive map of Wägitalersee
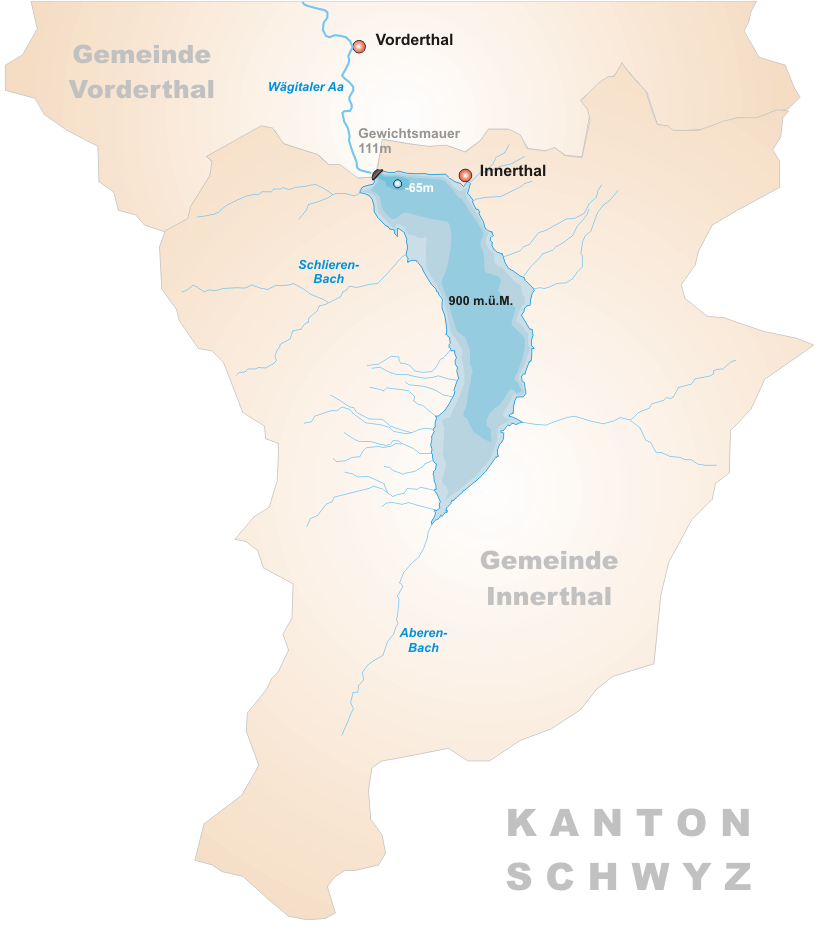
- Map
- Location: Schwyz
- Coordinates: 47°5′22″N 8°55′16″E
- Type: artificial lake
- Primary inflows: Aberenbach, Schlierenbach
- Primary outflows: Wägitaler Aa
- Catchment area: 42.7 km^{2} (16.5 sq mi)
- Basin countries: Switzerland
- Surface area: 4.18 km^{2} (1.61 sq mi)
- Max. depth: 65 m (213 ft)
- Surface elevation: 900 m (3,000 ft)
- Settlements: Innerthal

Wägitalersee is a reservoir lake in the municipality of Innerthal in the canton of Schwyz, Switzerland. It is situated in the Wägital (English: Wägi Valley). Its outflow is the Wägitaler Aa, which drains into Upper Lake Zurich at Lachen. It is surrounded by the mountains Gross Aubrig, Fluebrig, Zindlenspitz, Brünnelistock and Bockmattli.

The old village of Innerthal was flooded in 1924 when the dam Schräh was constructed. A new village was built on the current lake.

== Economy ==
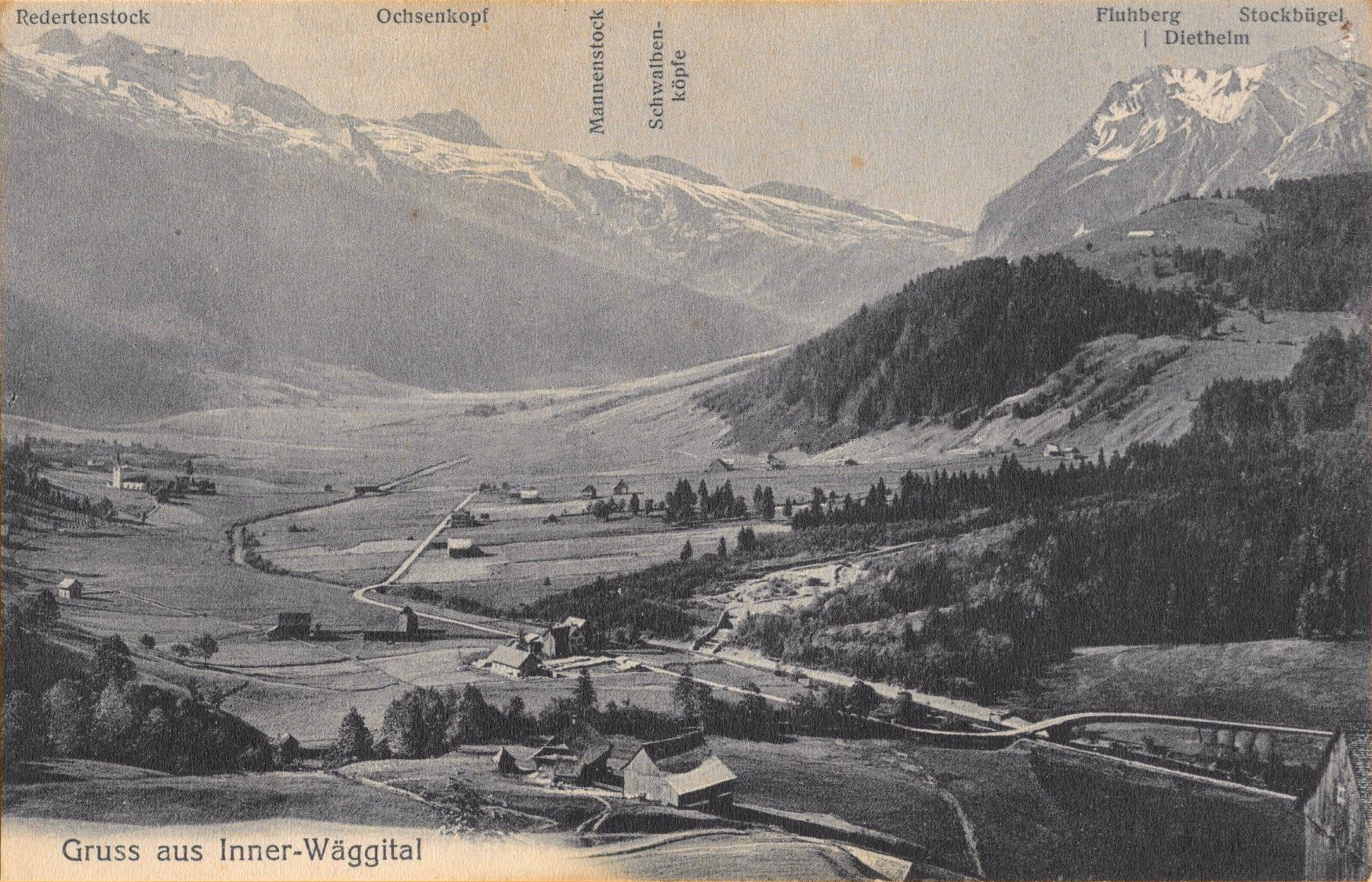
Wägital before creation of the reservoir lake (undated postcard)

The primary economical purpose of the Wägitalersee is to serve as reservoir for pumped-storage hydroelectricity. The power plant and the reservoir dam became operational in 1924, thereby creating the Wägitalersee. At the time, the dam was the tallest in the world at 366 feet having surpassed Arrowrock Dam located in Idaho, USA. The power plant is operated by NOK Wägital / AG Kraftwerk Wägital and produces approximately 120 million kWh of energy per year.

Besides the above industrial purpose, the lake is very popular as a (nearby) recreational area for families, hikers, nature lovers and especially fishermen. The waterside is easily accessible on foot and also by car (in certain areas). It can also be reached by a PostBus Switzerland route from Siebnen-Wangen station.

== See also ==
- List of lakes of Switzerland
- List of mountain lakes of Switzerland
