= Pragel Pass =

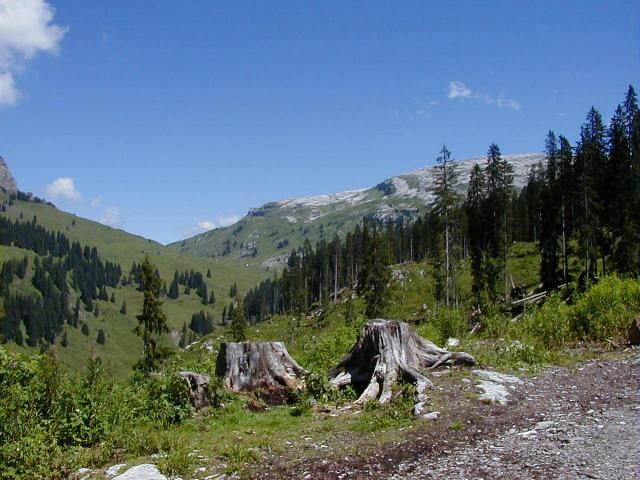
- Pragel Pass

- Location within Switzerland
- Elevation: 1,548 metres (5,079 ft)
- Traversed by: Road

Third Approach
- Location: Schwyz, Switzerland
- Range: Alps
- Coordinates: 46°59′57″N 08°50′45″E

Pragel Pass (el. 1548 m.) is a high mountain pass in the Swiss Alps between the cantons of Schwyz and Glarus between Muotathal and Netstal. The pass itself is located in the canton of Schwyz.

The pass road is parallel to the road over Klausen Pass and has a maximum grade of 18 percent. The east side of the pass road is closed to motorized vehicles on Saturdays and Sundays, which makes it ideal for bikers.

== See also ==
- List of highest paved roads in Europe
- List of mountain passes
- List of the highest Swiss passes
