= Schächentaler Windgällen =

Mountain in Switzerland

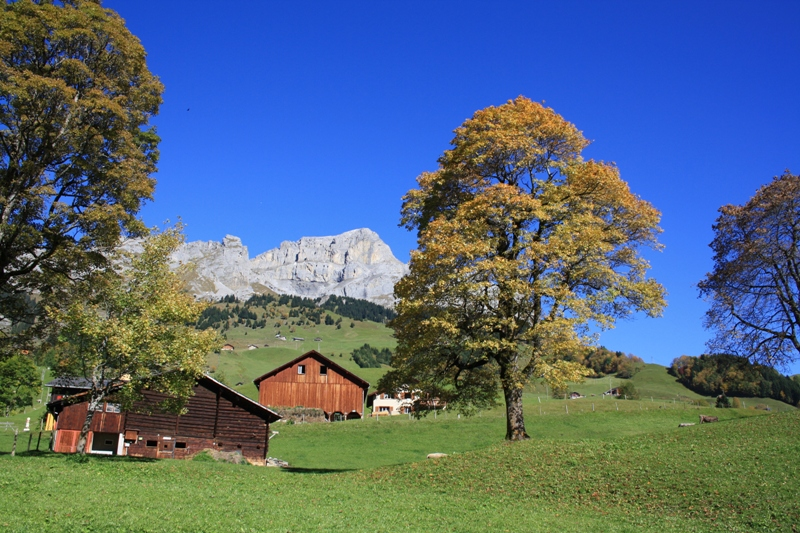
- View from near Unterschächen

Highest point
- Peak: Höch Windgällen
- Elevation: 2,764 m (9,068 ft)
- Prominence: 691 m (2,267 ft)
- Parent peak: Glärnisch
- Coordinates: 46°53′16.5″N 8°47′29.9″E

Naming
- Language of name: German

Geography
- Location within Switzerland
- Location: Uri, Switzerland
- Parent range: Schwyzer Alps
- Topo map: Swiss Federal Office of Topography swisstopo

The Schächentaler Windgällen is a mountain massif in the Schwyzer Alps, overlooking Unterschächen in the canton of Uri. The two named peaks are Höch Windgällen (2764 m) and Läged Windgällen (2572 m). The mountain massif lies between the valley of Muotathal (north) and Schächental (south). The Schächentaler Windgällen are located a few kilometres west of Klausen Pass.

The normal route to the summit goes along the south-east ridge. No official trail leads to the top, but the easiest route is marked with yellow dots over its last part.
