= Klöntalersee =

Swiss reservoir

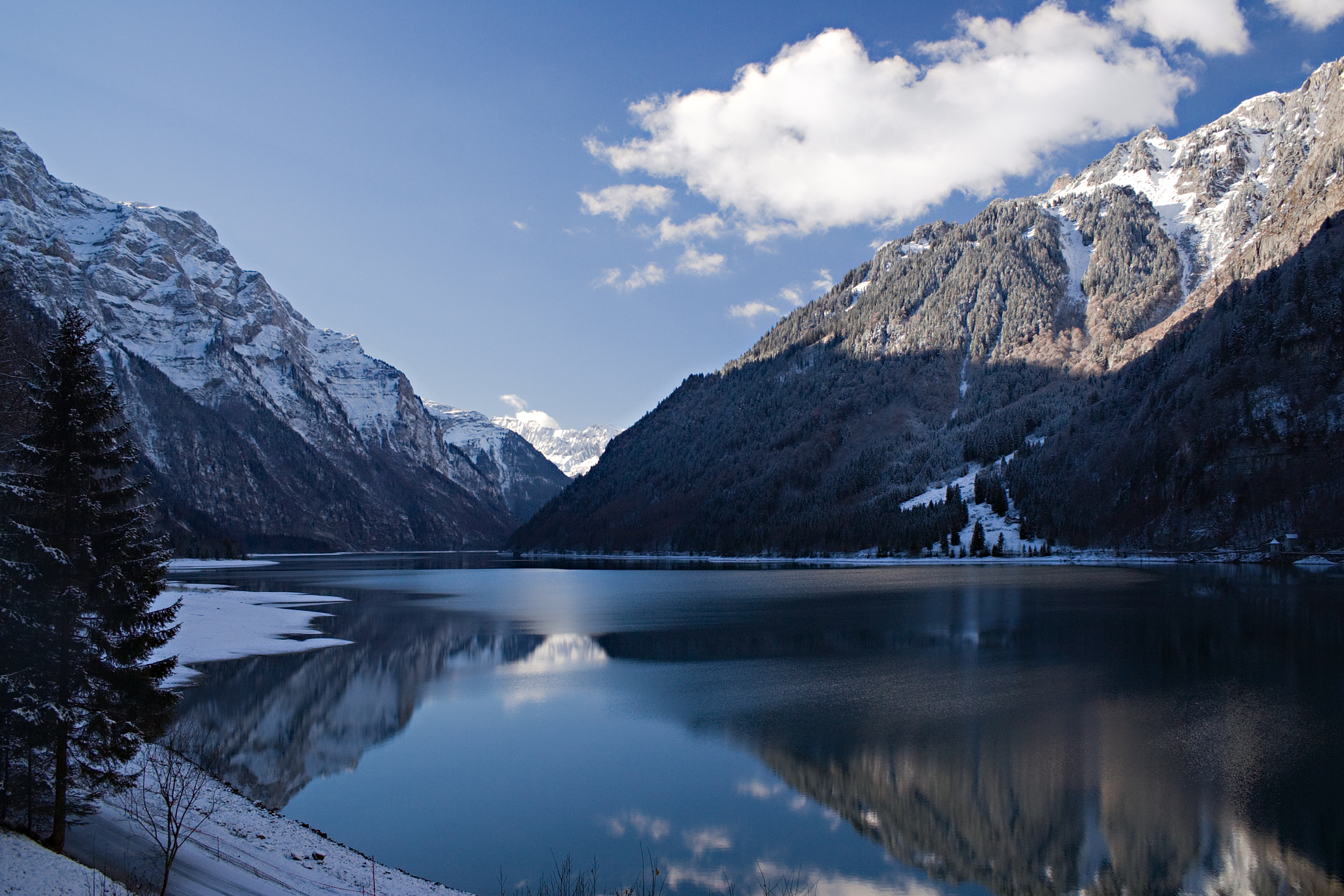

- Location within Canton of Glarus Location within Switzerland Location within Alps
- Interactive map of Klöntalersee
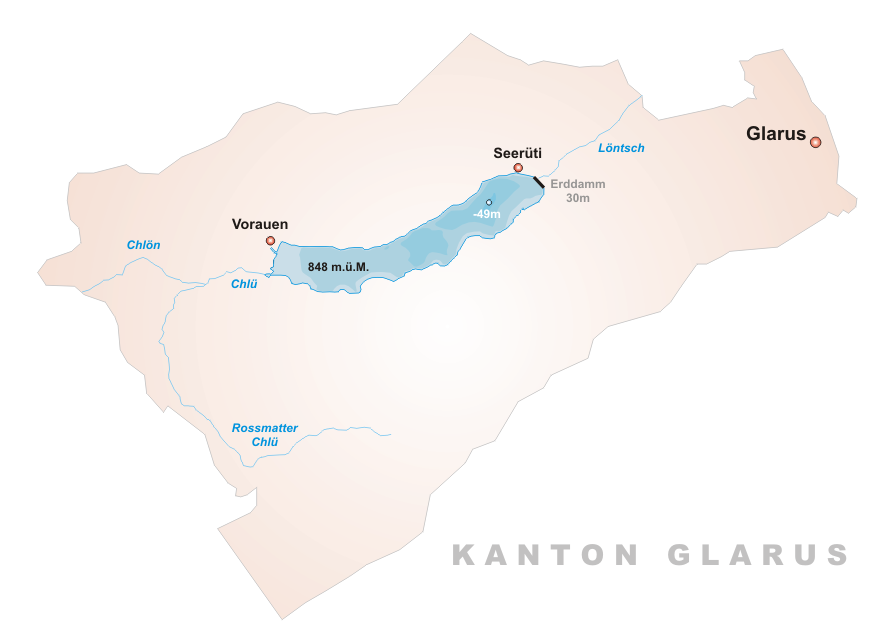
- map
- Location: Canton of Glarus
- Coordinates: 47°1′32″N 8°58′50″E
- Primary inflows: Klön (Chlü)
- Primary outflows: Löntsch
- Basin countries: Switzerland
- Surface area: 3.3 km^{2} (1.3 sq mi)
- Surface elevation: 848 m (2,782 ft)
- Settlements: Seerüti, Vorauen

Klöntalersee is a natural lake in the Klöntal valley in the canton of Glarus, Switzerland. It was formed by a rockslide and has served as a reservoir for hydroelectric power generation since 1908. The lake is impounded by the Rhodannenberg earthfill dam, which supplies water to a hydroelectric power station near Netstal.

Located at an elevation of 848 metres above sea level, the lake covers an area of approximately 3.3 square kilometres. It is considered the oldest major reservoir in Switzerland and is known for its frequently mirror-like surface that reflects the surrounding mountains. The primary inflow is the Klön stream, and the outflow is the Löntsch, which flows into the Linth near Netstal.

== History ==
Beginning in 1550, closed seasons for fishing were introduced at Klöntalersee to protect its fish stocks. During the 18th century, timber from surrounding forests was transported across the lake and floated downstream toward the Walensee.

A battle took place in a local valley called Klöntal, where Russo-Austrian troops pushed back the French during Suvorov's Swiss campaign as part of the French Revolutionary Wars.

From 1860 to 1953, ice was harvested from the lake for cooling purposes and distributed to Netstal, Glarus, and other areas. Between 1905 and 1908, a 21.5-metre-high earth dam was constructed at the eastern end of the lake, significantly increasing its volume and enabling its use as a reservoir for hydroelectric power.

A 2021 study by the Swiss Federal Institute of Aquatic Science and Technology (Eawag), reported by Swissinfo, identified Klöntalersee as one of several mid-altitude Swiss lakes at risk of losing its winter ice cover this century if global temperatures rise by more than 2°C. Reduced ice cover could alter lake stratification and water mixing patterns, potentially affecting oxygen distribution and aquatic ecosystems.

In May 2025, the Glarus Landsgemeinde approved three annual car-free Sundays at Klöntalersee. Starting in 2026, the area will be closed to motor vehicles on the last Sundays of June, July, and August, allowing access only to hikers and cyclists.

== Hydropower ==
Klöntalersee is impounded by the Rhodannenberg earthfill dam, now 30 metres high and 217 metres long, with an active storage capacity of 39.8 million cubic metres. Originally 21.5 metres high when first built, the dam was later raised to its current height. It is owned and operated by Nordostschweizerische Kraftwerke AG, now part of Axpo. It is equipped with a spillway (Hochwasserentlastung) to release excess water during high inflow events.

The lake forms part of the high-pressure Löntsch storage plant, based in Netstal and completely renovated in 2016. The plant uses the outflows of an 83 km² watershed around Klöntalersee, producing around 119 GWh of electricity per year. The energy content of the reservoir is 34 GWh, and about 29 percent of this can be stored.

Water for electricity generation is taken in through an intake structure on the lake shore and channelled through a 4-kilometre pressure tunnel to a surge tank above Netstal. The water then drops about 365 metres to the turbines. The tunnel can carry up to 20 cubic metres of water per second, which limits the plant’s maximum output to roughly 60 megawatts.

== Recreation ==
Klöntalersee is used for various recreational activities, including swimming, canoeing, windsurfing, angling, and ice diving in winter. There are campsites at Güntlenau and Vorauen, and a marked trail encircles the lake. The surrounding area includes protected natural features such as the nationally significant floodplain at the mouth of the Klön and the shell limestone formations. On the east bank is a nature reserve, and nearby attractions include the Sulzbach Falls.

== Gallery ==
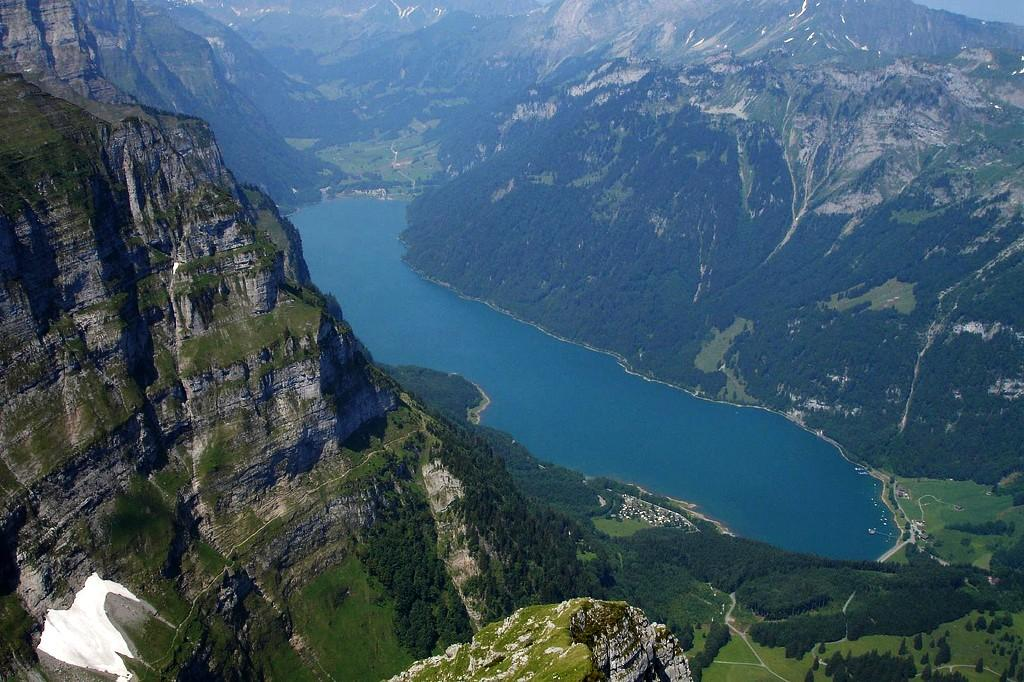
Klöntalersee viewed from Vorder Glärnisch, showing surrounding Alpine landscape

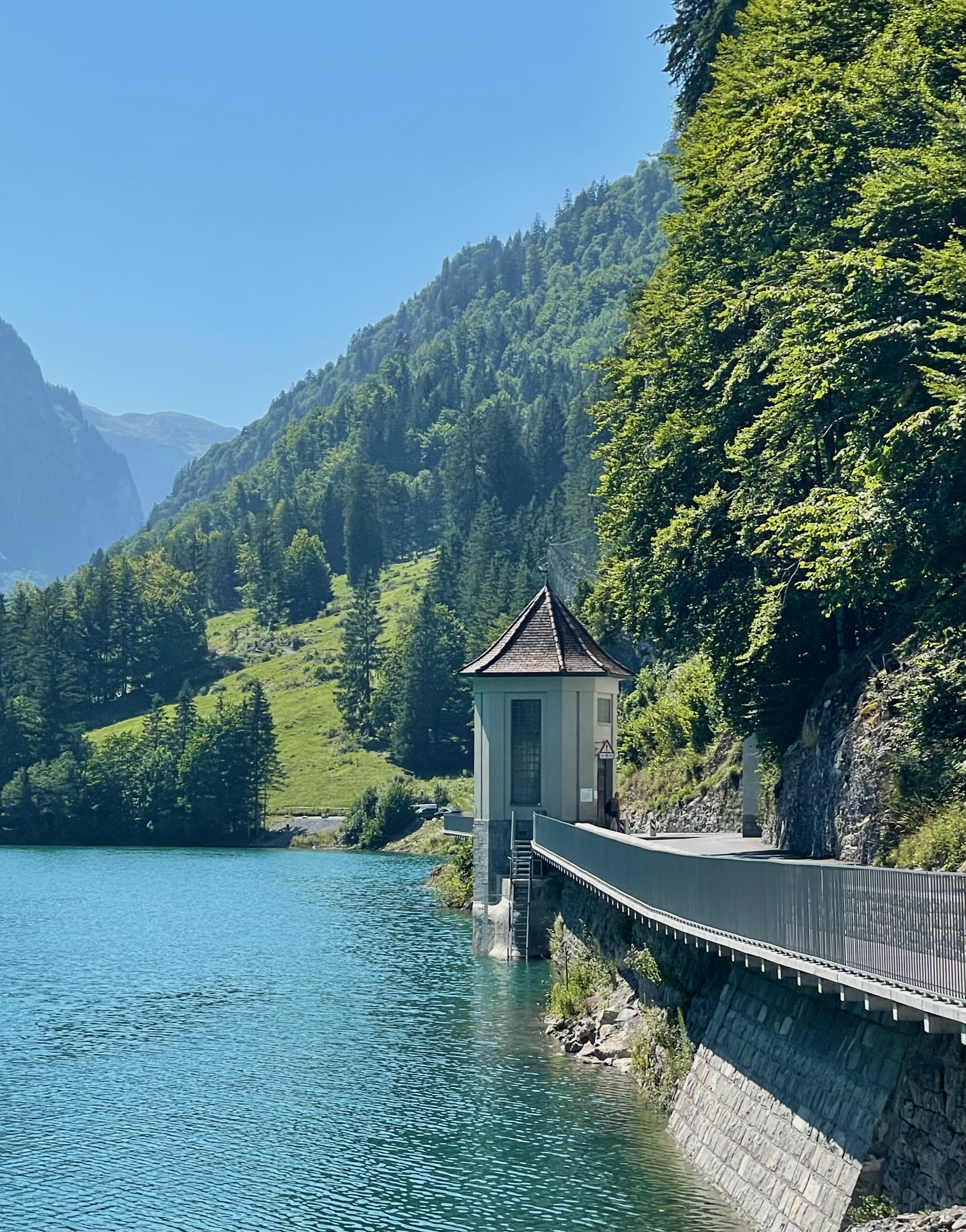
Intake structure on the eastern shore, feeding the Löntsch hydroelectric power station in Netstal

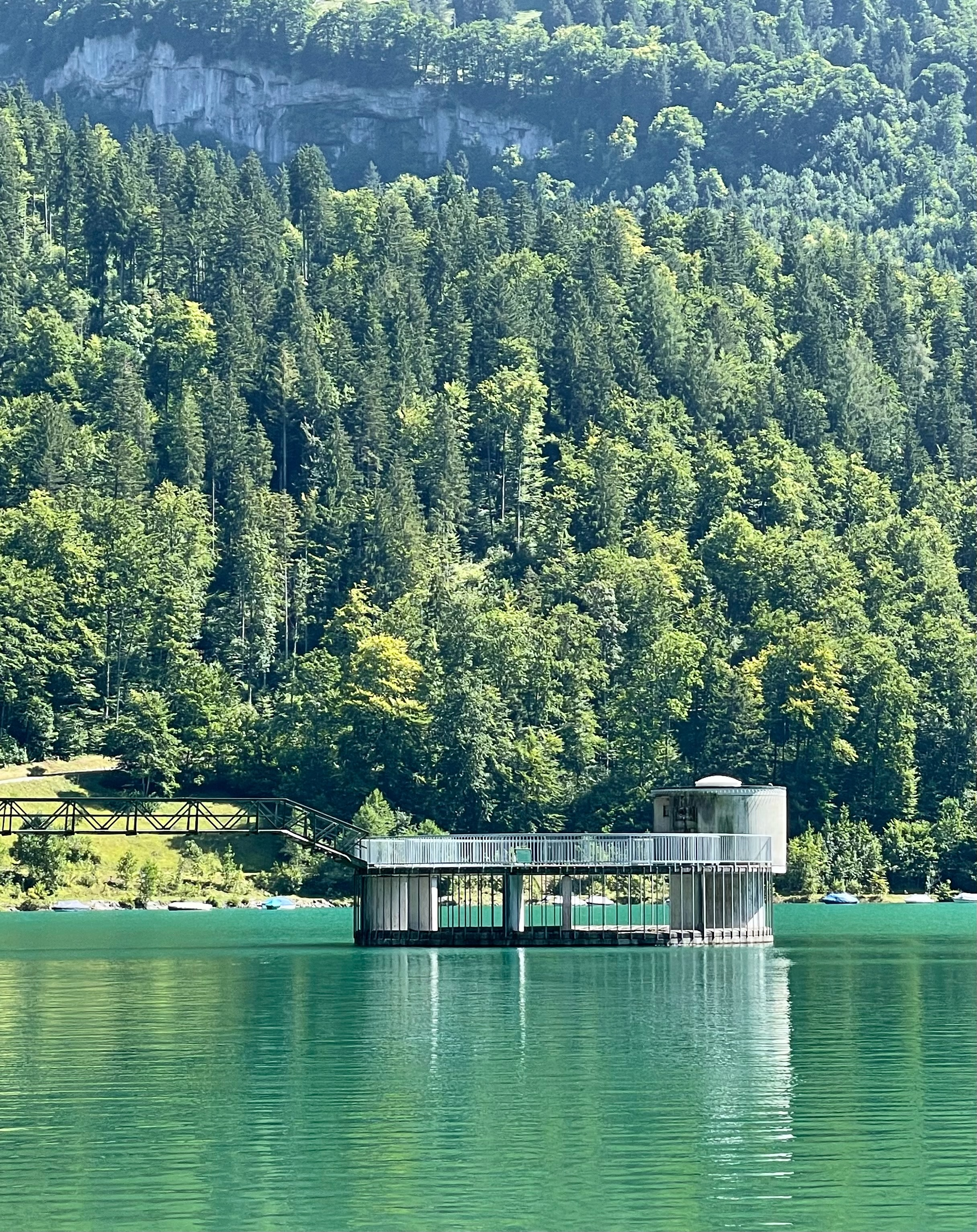
Spillway tower at the Rhodannenberg dam, releasing excess water during high inflow

== See also ==
- Hydropower in Switzerland
- Linth River
- List of lakes of Switzerland
- List of mountain lakes of Switzerland
