= Beatrix von Wolhusen =

Swiss abbess (c.1308–1398)

- Born: 1308
- Died: 16 July 1398 (aged 89–90); Zurich
- Occupation: Mayor, Christian nun
- Position held: abbess (1358–1398)

Beatrix von Wolhusen (c. 1308 – 16 July 1398, Zurich) was a Swiss abbess. She led the Fraumünster Abbey and, effectively, Zurich itself for 40 years, from 1358 until her death.

== Biography ==
Beatrix von Wolhusen was born around 1308. Her father was named Walter, and she had a brother named Peter, who would later become abbot of the territorial abbey of Einsiedeln.

She ran in the 1340 election to succeed the previous abbess of the Fraumünster Abbey, Elisabeth von Matzingen, but lost to her rival, Fides von Klingen. This election was highly controversial and had to be settled by an arbitrator appointed by Emperor Louis IV.

She won the next election in 1358 and held the position of abbess of the Fraumünster until her death, as well as the rank of imperial princess and ruler of the city. In these capacities, she was the person signing Zurich's official charters in 1373 and 1393. She certified municipal acts, such as the sales and purchases of land. In 1373, tasked with collecting a tax to fund a crusade, she sent 50 gold florins to Konstanz under the supervision of her steward, Heinrich Martini von Walse, but he was robbed on the way.

Her management of the city was marked by the council's attempts to free itself from her authority, leading to a power struggle between them. She eventually lost this conflict in 1397, when the council decided to limit her powers and appointed three administrators to assist her.

She died on 16 July 1398 in Zurich, and was succeeded by Anna von Bussnang.
