= Etzelwerk =

Power plant company in Switzerland

Coordinates: 47°09′15″N 8°46′55″E

Etzelwerk AG
- Type: Corporation
- Industry: Energy production
- Founded: 12 August 1931
- Headquarters: Einsiedeln SZ
- Key people: Markus Geyer

Etzelwerk AG, based in Einsiedeln, is a Swiss power plant company that produces traction current (16.7 Hz).

Etzelwerk
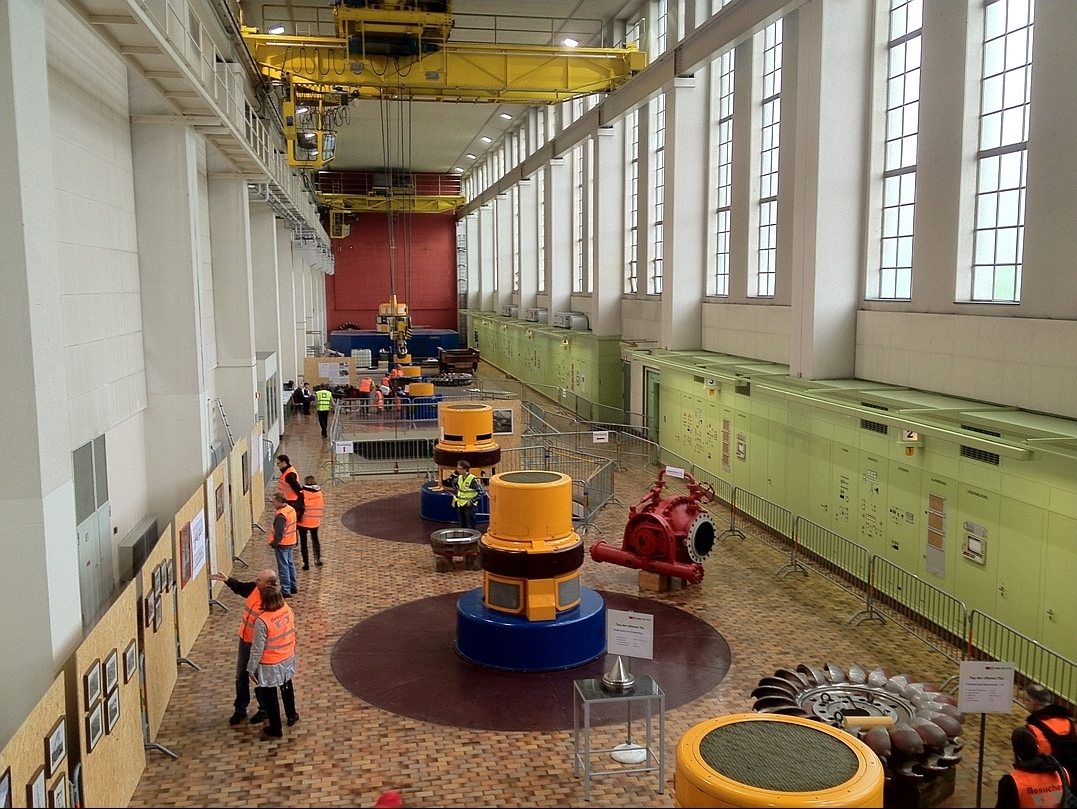
- Machine room at the headquarters in Altendorf SZ
- Country: Switzerland
- Location: Altendorf SZ
- Construction began: 1899
- Site elevation: 425 m (1,394 ft)

== History ==
An initial project to build a power station with a storage reservoir in the high valley east of Einsiedeln was proposed in the Schweizerische Bauzeitung newspaper in 1899. Developed by Louis Kürsteiner in collaboration with Maschinenfabrik Oerlikon (MFO), it aimed to capture unused hydropower at night for daytime use. Electricity was recognised as an easily transportable energy form that could enhance Switzerland's energy independence. In 1900, MFO secured concession agreements with the districts of Einsiedeln and Höfe. In 1902, the canton of Zurich expressed interest, and in 1904, it proposed to the Federal Council that the power plant electrify the SBB. However, a thorough examination, published in 1906, revealed that the concessions were insufficient for construction and could not be transferred to the SBB for legal reasons, leading to their expiration in October 1910.

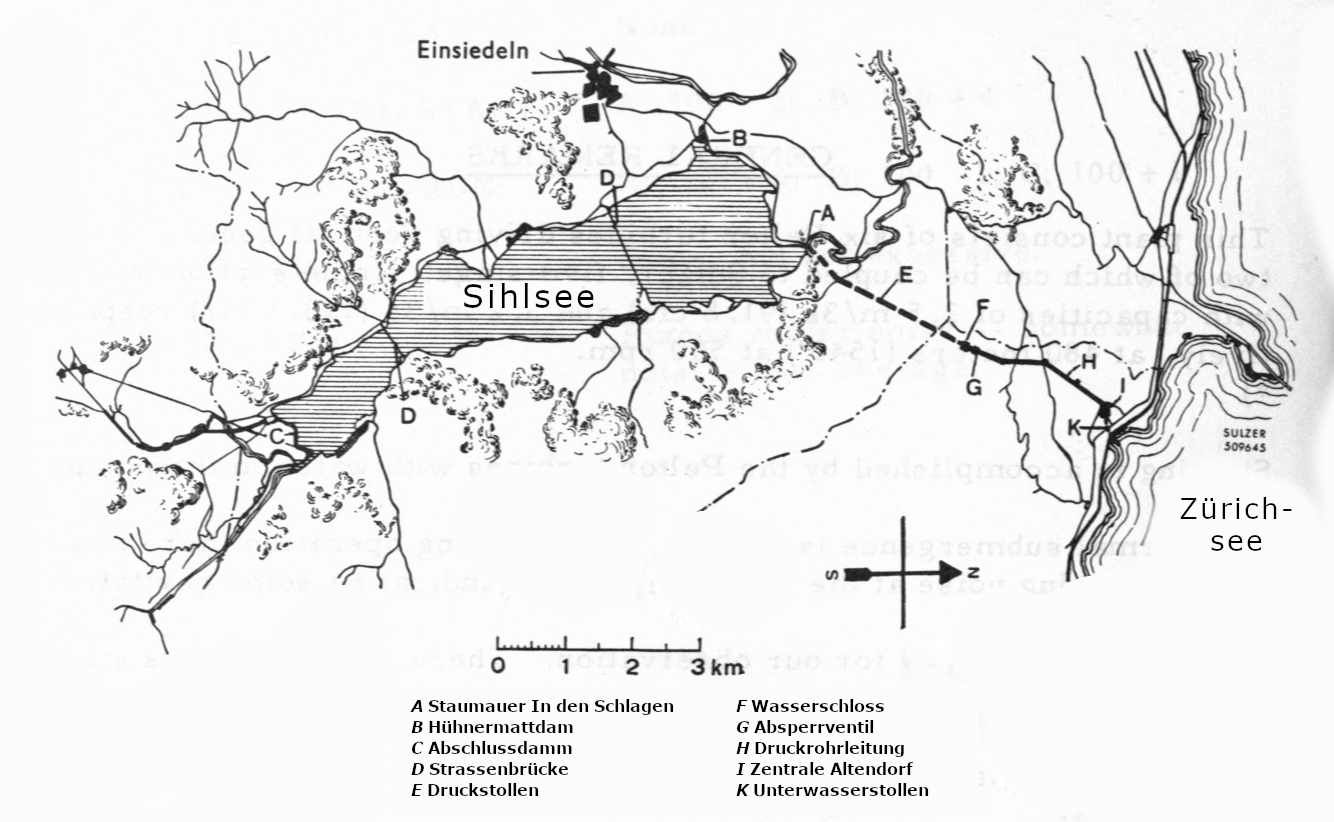
Overview plan of the Etzelwerk

During the First World War, concession negotiations were suspended but resumed afterwards, resulting in agreements with the cantons of Zurich and Zug in 1919. In 1929, the canton of Schwyz followed, after agreements in 1926 clarified that the districts of Schwyz and March were not eligible for concessions.

The concession granted the Swiss Federal Railways (SBB) and the North-Eastern Swiss Power Stations (NOK) the right to generate electricity using water from the Sihl. Unusually, the concession was issued by five concessionaires: the cantons of Schwyz, Zurich, and Zug, and the districts of Einsiedeln and Höfe. In 1932, construction began on the future Sihlsee lake and the pumped storage power station headquarters in Altendorf on the upper Lake Zurich; construction was completed in 1937.

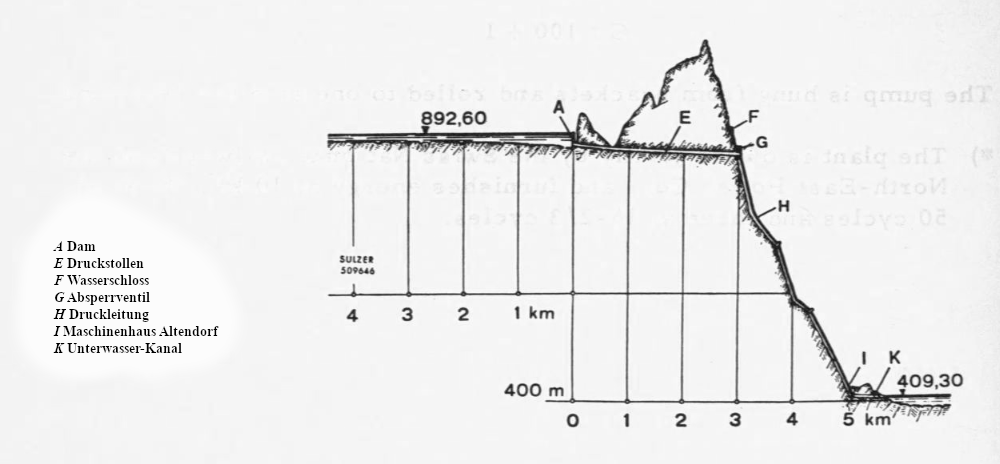
Longitudinal profile of the Etzelwerk

The power station began operating with six Pelton turbines: three machine sets produced three-phase alternating current for the national grid, and three produced single-phase alternating current for the SBB. In 1947, two storage pumps were installed. Between 1969 and 1973, the power station was expanded to include a seventh machine set, equipped with a single-phase alternating current generator motor for both power generation and pumping.

Until 30 September 1987, NOK supplied the canton of Schwyz with electricity (50 Hz) from the joint venture. Ahead of the licence renewal, NOK sold its 50% stake in Etzelwerk to SBB, which applied for the licence renewal as the sole shareholder. The power plant received a transitional concession valid until December 2022. Following NOK's withdrawal, two high-voltage lines were dismantled, and the three three-phase alternating current generators were replaced with single-phase alternating current generators.

In the years up to 1999, the SBB invested around CHF 100 million in the Etzelwerk. Fewer personnel were needed, as the facilities of the Etzelwerk began to be controlled remotely from Seebach in Zurich. As a result, SBB reduced the number of personnel from 37 to just over 10 and fired Walter Breitegger, who had led the Etzelwerk in Altendorf for 18 years. In 2015, the Etzelwerk produced 257,114 megawatt-hours of power and earned CHF 1.052 million in profit.

On 26 October 2023, the SBB received a new concession for the Etzelwerk, retroactively valid from 1 January 2023. The new concession extends the previous one for another 80 years. They also received a new pumping concession. In return, the SBB must pay CHF 3 million in Wasserzinsen and additional fees to the granting polities: the cantons of Schwyz, Zurich, and Zug, as well as the districts of Höfe and Einsiedeln. The concession grantors also receive preferential access to some of the power generated by the Etzelwerk. SBB also committed to improving infrastructure around the Sihlsee, including the Willerzell viaduct.

== Technology ==
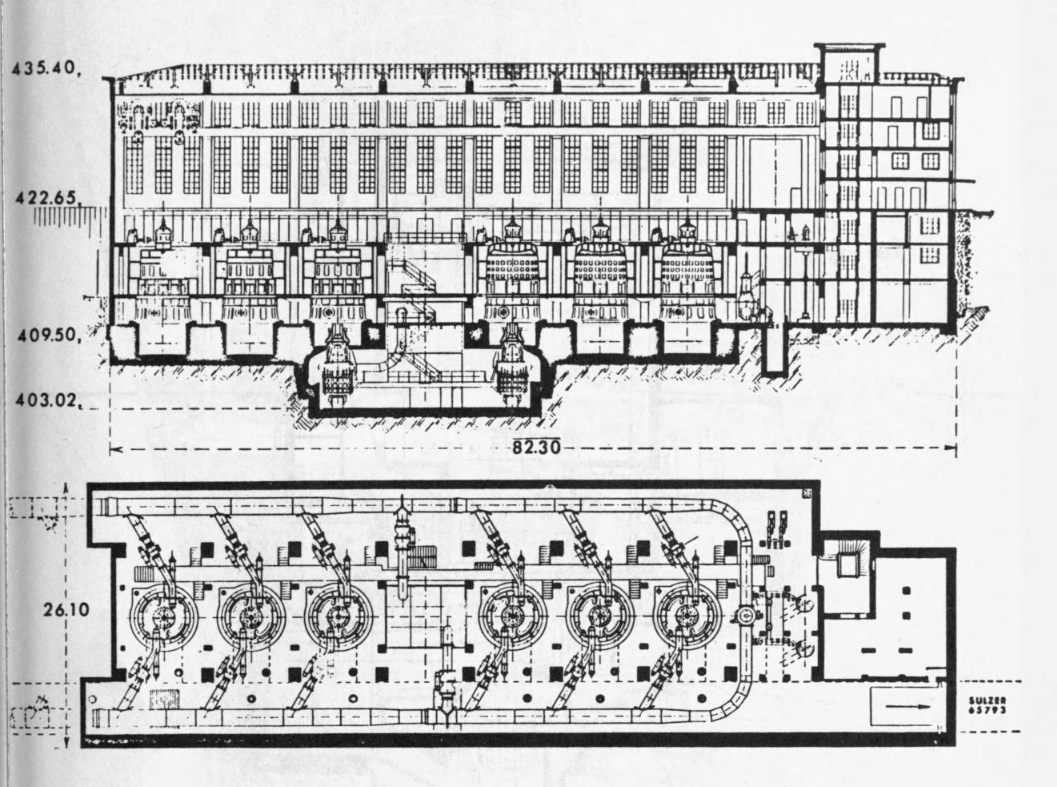
Longitudinal section and floor plan of the Altendorf SZ machine room

The Sihl is dammed by the heavyweight dam In den Schlagen to form the Sihlsee. The 11 km² reservoir has a catchment area of 156 km². The lake's target water level is 889 m above sea level, while the powerhouse in Altendorf SZ is at 416 m, enabling the turbines to utilise a head of over 473 m. The powerhouse houses seven large machine sets and two small Pelton turbines for internal demand. All machine sets operate with single-phase alternating current from the traction current network at 16.7 Hz. Traction current lines extend from the substation to Rapperswil SG, Steinen, and the Ziegelbrücke–Sargans.

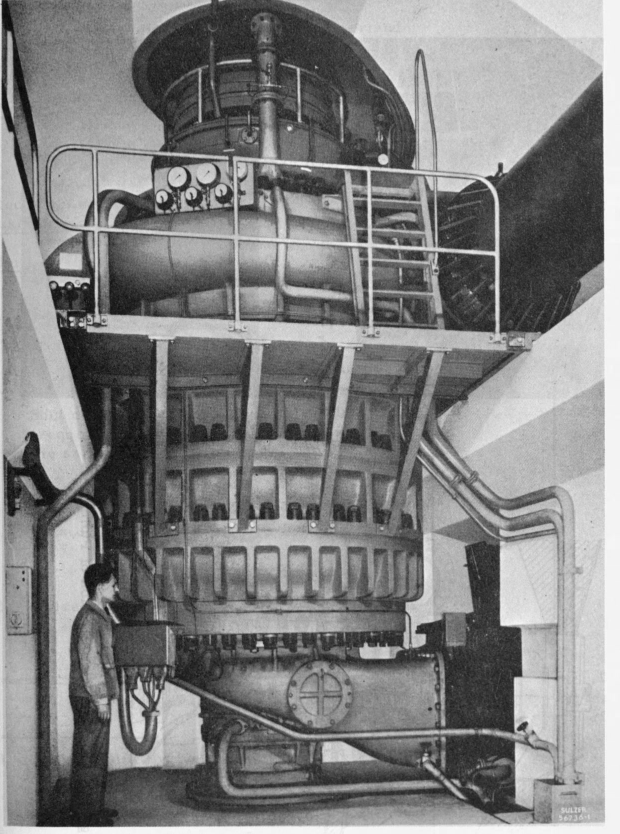
Storage pump

The vertical-axis machine sets operate at 500 revolutions per minute, consisting of a two-nozzle Pelton turbine with a screen generator. In machine sets 3 and 4, a five-stage centrifugal pump is located below the turbine wheel. The pump in machine set 4 initially had a 10% higher delivery rate than expected, leading to a smaller impeller in machine set 3's pump, resulting in a 10% lower output. When starting, the pumps are filled with water, brought to operating speed with the Pelton turbine, and then synchronised with the grid as a motor.

Between 1969 and 1973, the machine room was extended by 25 metres, and a seventh machine set was installed, comprising a six-nozzle Pelton turbine, a single-phase alternating current motor generator, and a five-stage centrifugal pump. Its layout mirrors the existing machine sets. The turbine has an output of 44 MW, and the pump has an output of 22 MW, operating at 500 revolutions per minute.

Two small vertical-axis Pelton turbines, each with an output of 220 kW, supply three-phase alternating current for the power station's own needs.

== See also ==
- List of hydroelectric power plants in Switzerland
