= Schwedentritt cross-country skiing trail =

Swiss cross-country skiing trail

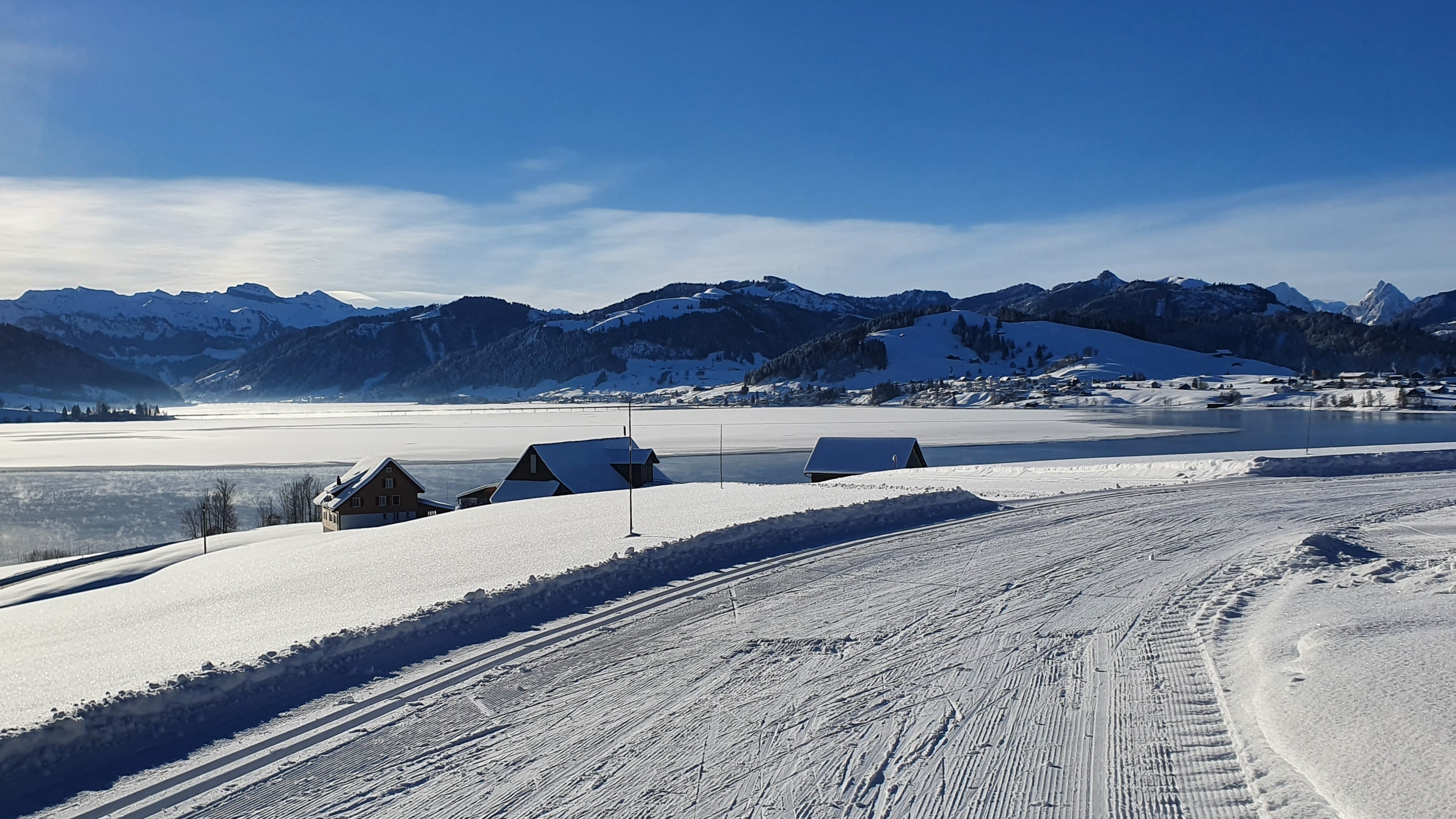
Schwedentritt cross-country skiing trail and Sihlsee

The Schwedentritt cross-country skiing trail (Loipe Schwedentritt in German) is a cross-country skiing trail in Einsiedeln in Switzerland. The trail is groomed in both skating and classic style. It begins at Einsiedeln Abbey, then leads along Sihlsee and finally through the Schwantenau high moorland. The total distance is 21.1 km (Half marathon), but can be shortened to 4, 12 or 15 km. Due to the numerous inclines, the trail is physically demanding. Since the landscape with its bogs and birches is reminiscent of Sweden, the trail was named Schwedentritt (literally Sweden's step) in the 1970s.

== Einsiedeln ski marathon ==
Every February the Einsiedeln ski marathon takes place on the trail. The Einsiedeln-born cross-country skiing legend and Olympic medal winner Alois «Wisel» Kälin took part in the competition several times and also won several times, thus contributing to the popularity of the trail.

== Images ==
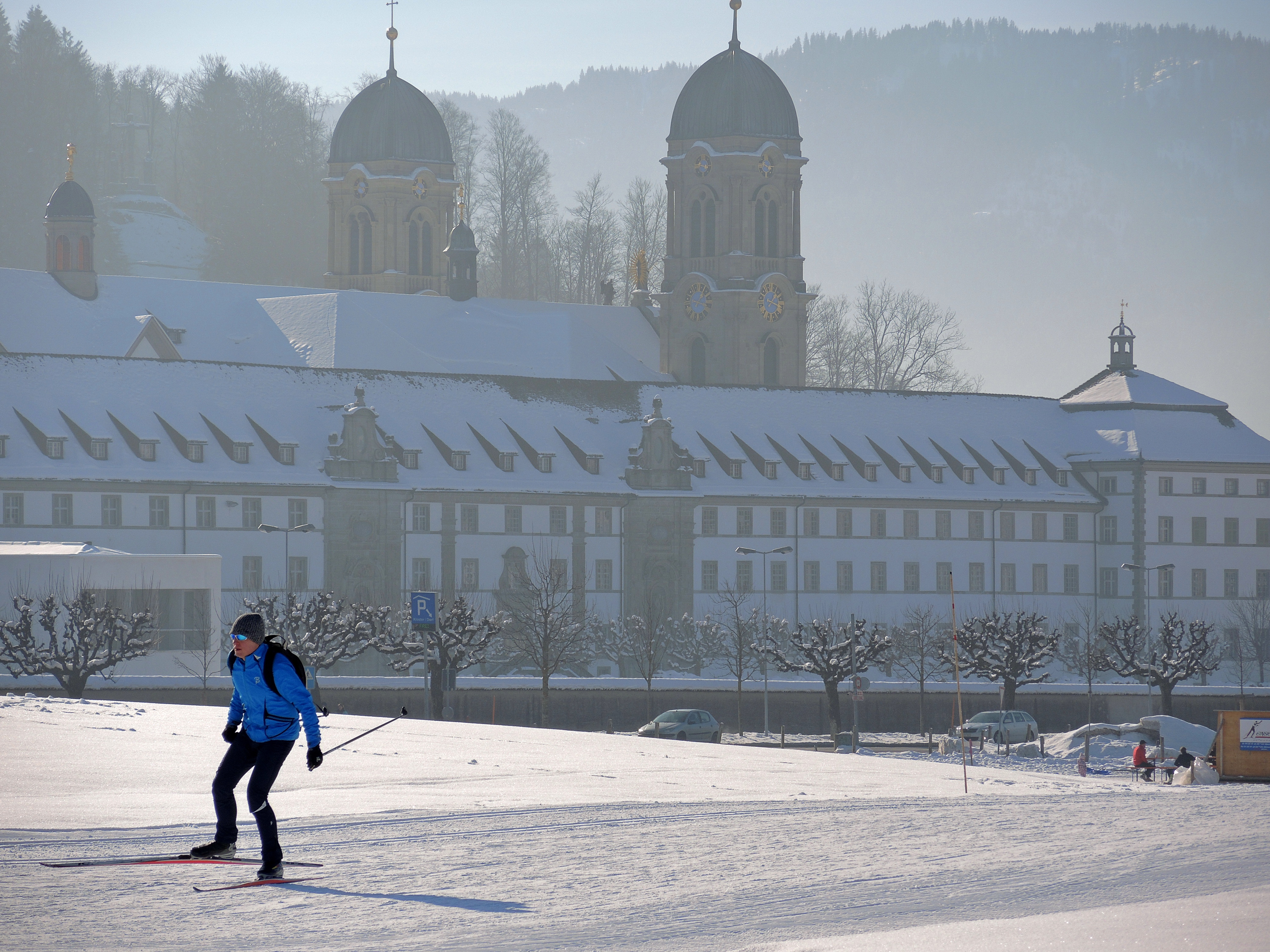
Start at Einsiedeln Abbey

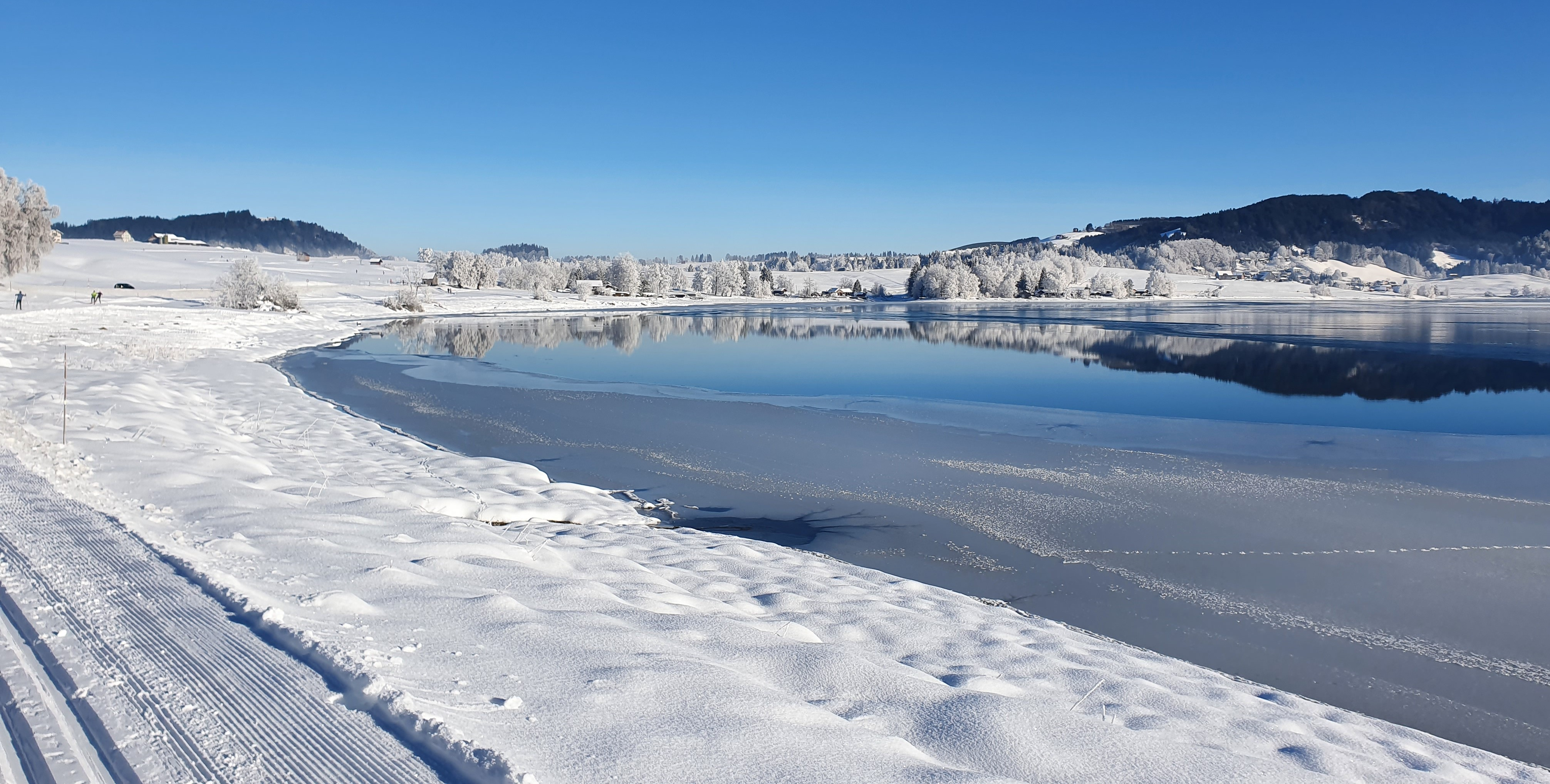
At the northern shore of Sihlsee

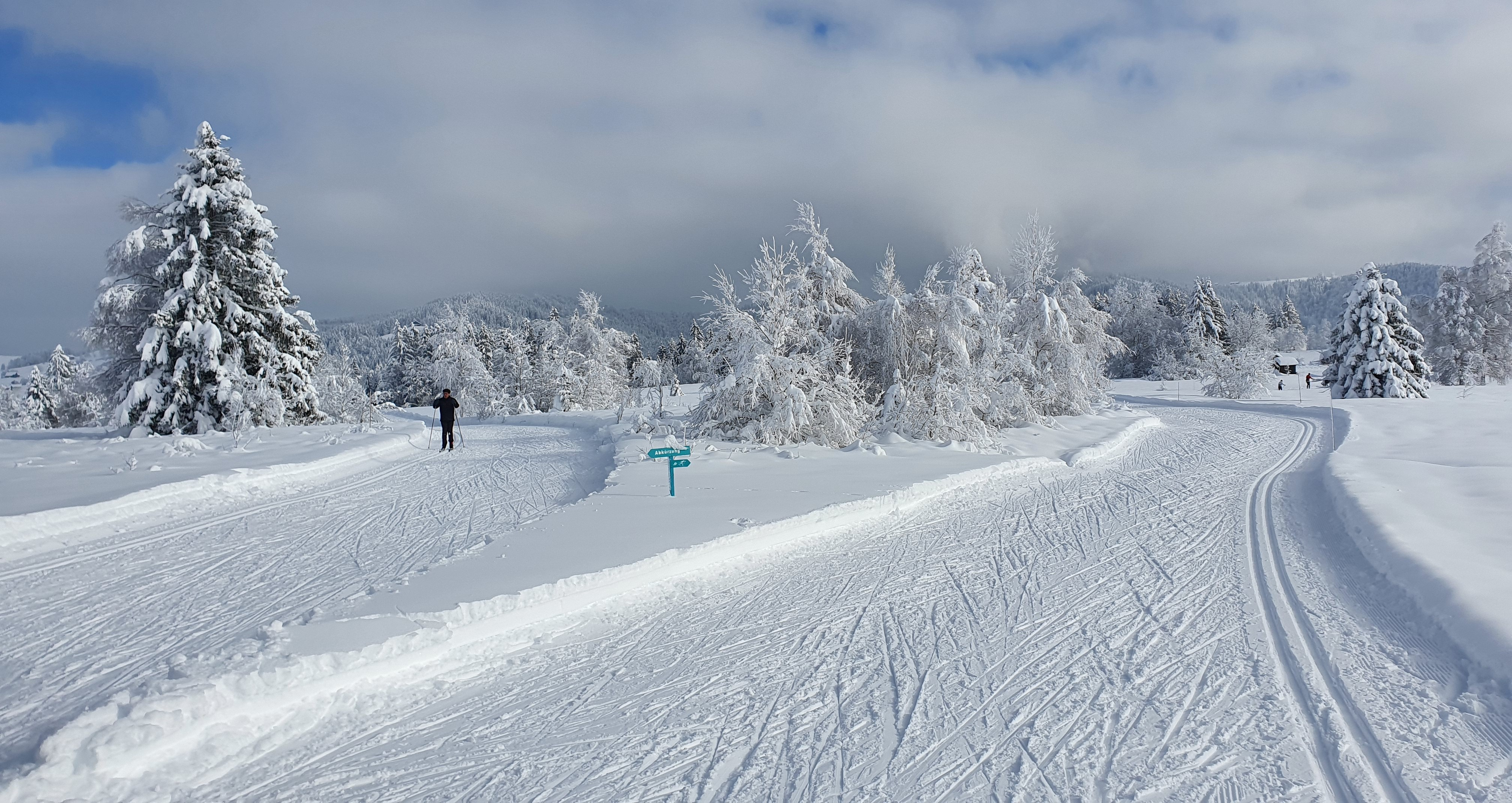
Near Roblosen

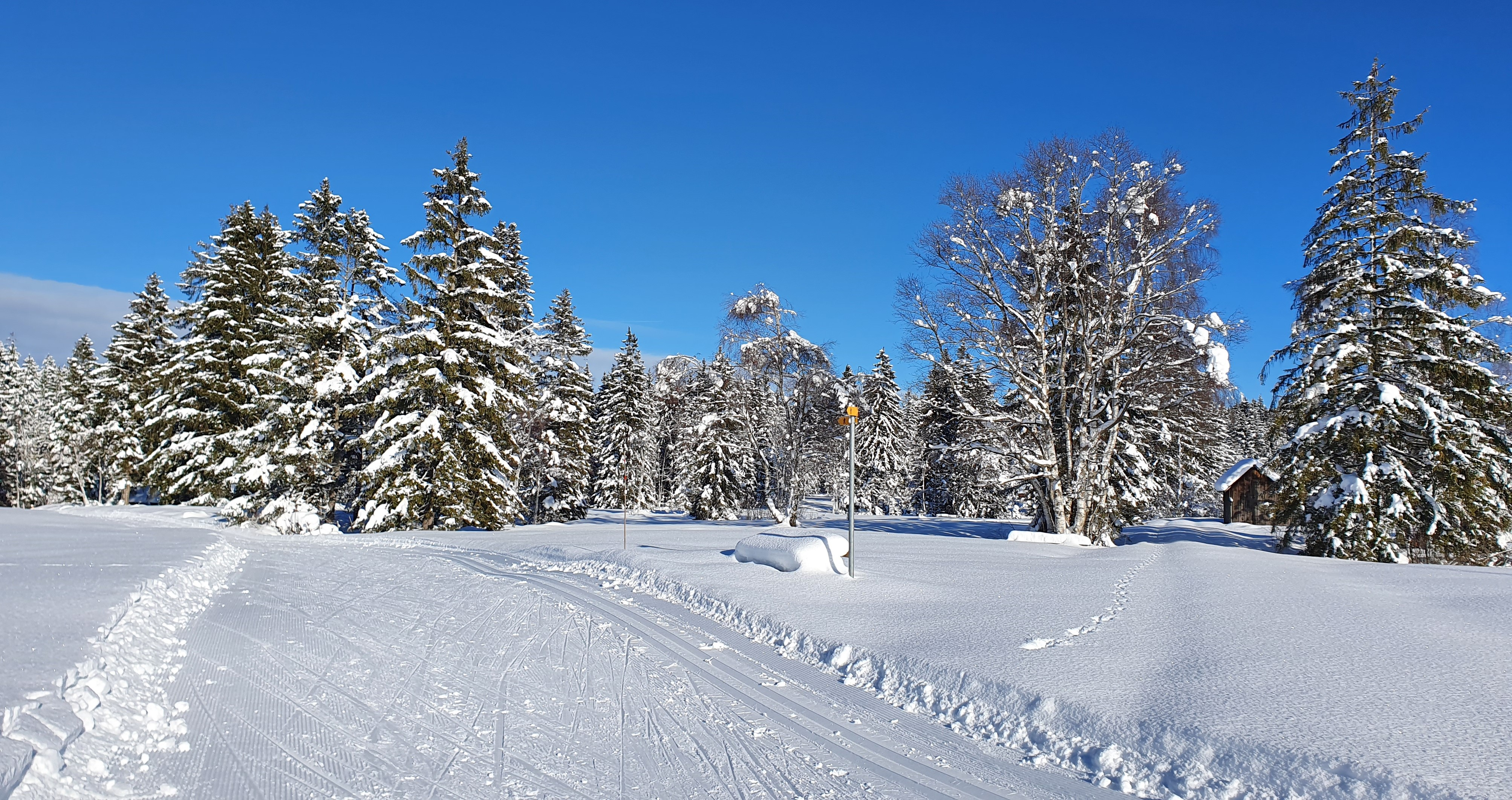
In the Schwantenau bog

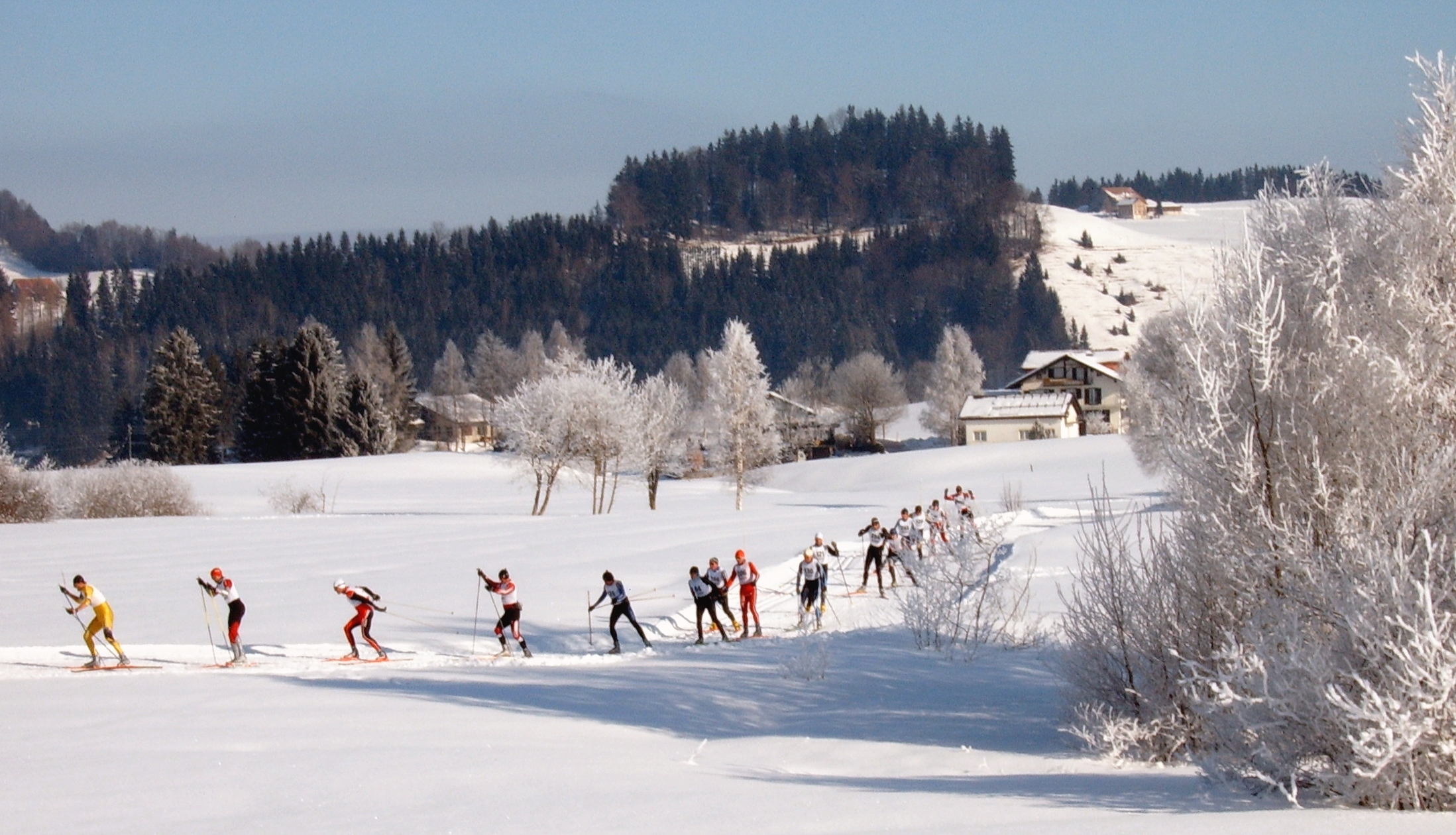
Cross-country skiers at Einsiedeln Ski Marathon 2006
