= Chli Aubrig =

Mountain in Switzerland

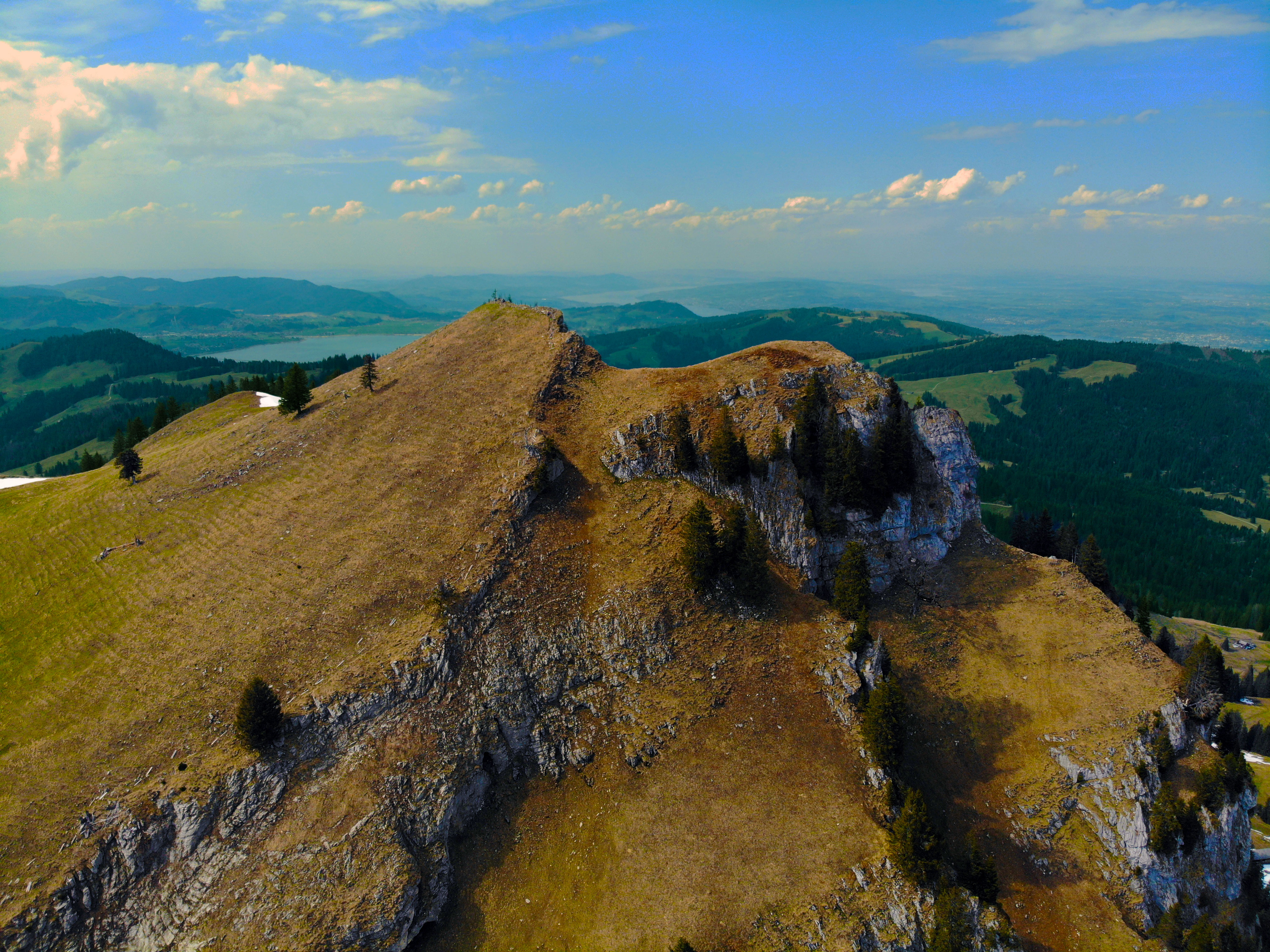
- View from the south

Highest point
- Elevation: 1,642 m (5,387 ft)
- Prominence: 201 m (659 ft)
- Parent peak: Gross Aubrig
- Coordinates: 47°06′27″N 08°51′44″E

Geography
- Location within Switzerland Location within Canton of Schwyz
- Country: Switzerland
- Canton: Schwyz
- Parent range: Schwyzer Alps

Climbing
- Easiest route: Trail

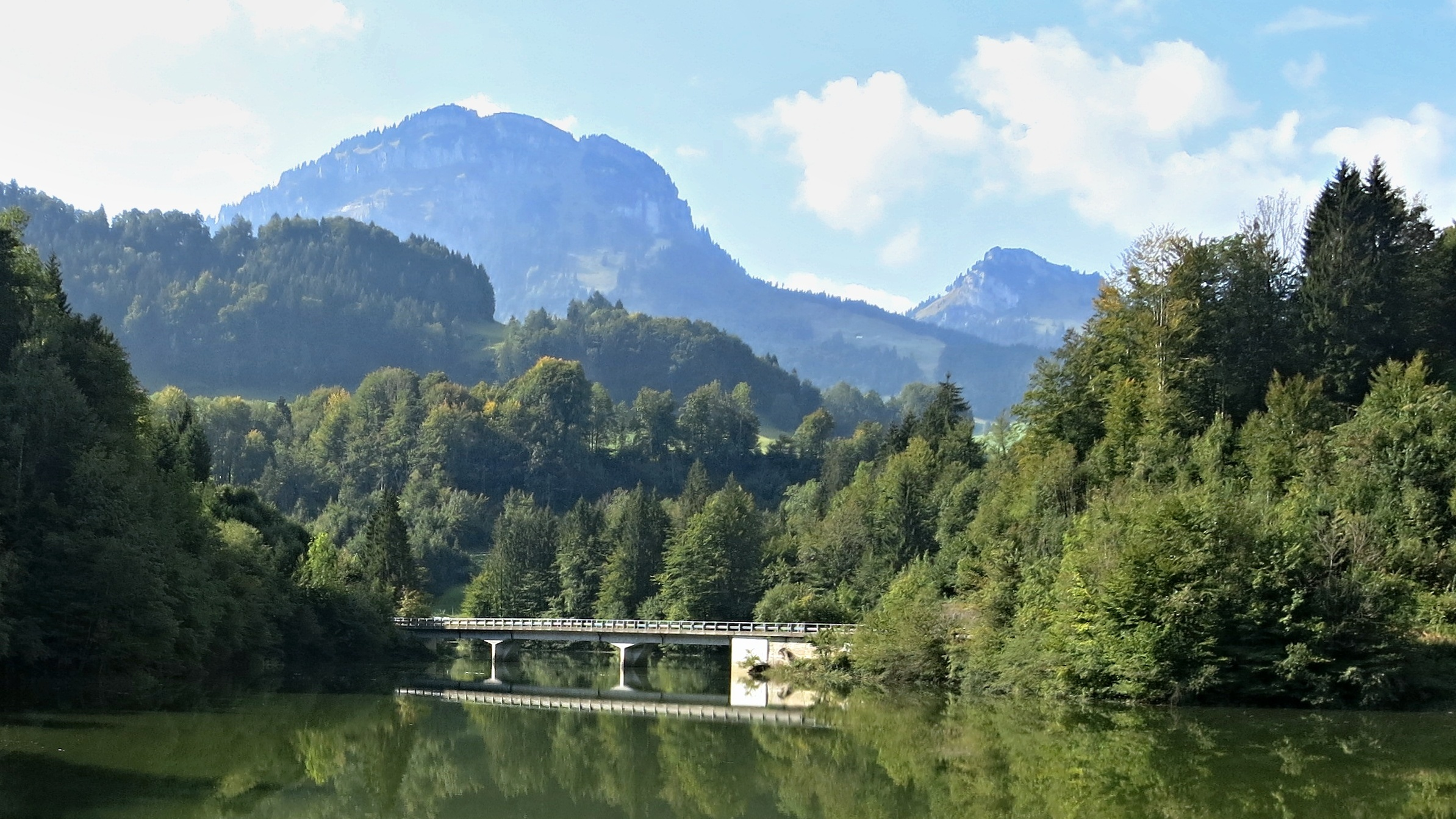
Chli Aubrig (right) and Gross Aubrig (left)

The Chli Aubrig (lit. 'Small Aubrig', 1,642 m [5,387 ft]) is a mountain of the Swiss Prealps, located between Euthal and Vorderthal in the canton of Schwyz. It lies west of the higher Gross Aubrig (1,695 m [5,561 ft]).

== See also ==
- List of mountains of the canton of Schwyz
