= Euthal =

- Municipality
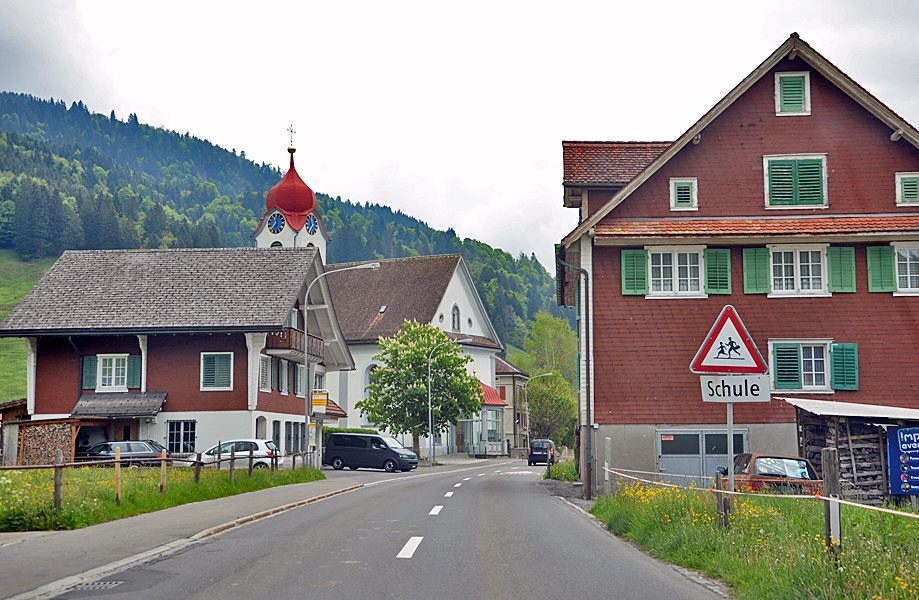
- Location of Euthal
- Location within Switzerland Location within Canton of Schwyz
- Coordinates: 47°6′N 8°49′E
- Country: Switzerland
- Canton: Schwyz
- District: Einsiedeln
- Municipality: Einsiedeln
- Elevation: 895 m (2,936 ft)

Population (10 January 2018)
  - Total: 614
- Time zone: UTC+01:00 (CET)
  - Summer (DST): UTC+02:00 (CEST)
- Postal code: 8844
- ISO 3166 code: CH-SZ
- Surrounded by: Einsiedeln, Innerthal, Oberiberg, Unteriberg, Vorderthal
- Website: www.euthal.ch

The village Euthal is a borough (viertel) in the district of Einsiedeln in the canton of Schwyz in Switzerland It is located at an altitude of 895 meters above sea level in the valley of the Sihlsee. [ Euthal is the southernmost village on the Sihlsee. The name refers to the meadows ("auen") along the formerly swampy valley floor of the Sihl and the plump side valley on the eastern side of the Sihl Valley. The rivers Sihl, Minster and Eubach merge into Sihlsee in Euthal.

The county line south of Euthal forms the valley dialect boundary between the Einsiedler and Ybriger dialect and is the border to district Schwyz.

The village has its own modern school.

== History ==
Euthal is first mentioned in an urbarium from 1331 as "Öital".

In 1696 a chapel was established for Our Lady Of Sorrows. In 1717 the chapel was indulged by Pope Clement XI. From 1790-1792 brother Jakob Natter designed by the architect monastery the significantly larger, still standing Sanctuary of Our Lady of Sorrows. In 1800 it was raised temporarily to be the parish church.

In 1703 the existence of a small school is mentioned for the first time, which operated till the 19th century. In 2014 a modern school was built in place of it.

In 1849 Euthal was incorporated into the municipality of Einsiedeln

== Historic population ==
In 1888 there where 103 houses with 126 families in Euthal

The historical population is given in the following table:

year	population
1888	637
...	...
1998	593
1999	599
2000	591
2001	615
2002	611
2003	623
2004	630
2005	631
2006	617
2007	621
2008	605
2009	598
2010	605
2011	607
2012	611
2013	609
2014	598
2015	610
2016	603
2017	614

As of 2016, a large new housing project is being built next to the Eubach river which adds 50 residences in 10 buildings thus likely increasing the population by at least 150 people.

== Employment ==
A major employer in Euthal is Silac AG which produces a variety of plastic products. Their industrial precursor was the bindery Verlagsanstalt Benziger, who had brought from 1865 to mid-20th century some work in this area. Further employment is mostly agricultural or in smaller companies.

== Transport ==
Einsiedeln railway station is a terminal station of the Zürich S-Bahn on the lines S13 and S40, provided by the Südostbahn.

== Tourism ==
The Einwohnerverein Euthal is the primary tourism organisation that provides information about the village. The Verkehrsverein Euthal maintains the local walking and snow show routes.

The nearby reservoir, Sihlsee, is used in summer for swimming, surfing and sailing, and in the winter for ice-skating.

In May of each year the Music Club Euthal (Musikverein Euthal)] organises the MaiFascht.

== Sports ==
Due to good wind conditions and good thermals paragliders can often be seen hovering over the area. In winter the Ski Club Euthal can be found in the surrounding mountains and when nature allows there is a natural iceskating rink on the Sihlsee.

The village has its own ski lift.

== Culture ==
The Theater Club Euthal performs often on the premises of Silac AG and the Eubach Buebe are often heard playing in the village.
