= Elisabeth von Spiegelberg =

Swiss abbess (1265–1308)

- Born: 13th century
- Died: 22 February 1308; Zurich
- Occupation: Christian nun
- Position held: abbess (1298–1308)

Elisabeth von Spiegelberg (before 1265 – 22 February 1308, Zurich) was a Swiss abbess. She led the Fraumünster Abbey and, effectively, Zurich itself for 10 years, from 1298 until her death.

== Biography ==
Originally from a family of barons in Thurgau, she is first mentioned in Zurich in 1265, when she is recorded as a nun at the Fraumünster Abbey. She became abbess in 1298, succeeding Elisabeth von Wetzikon.

She lost part of the abbey's privileges regarding authority over the city of Zurich, notably being required to have certain matters judged by three canons, of whom she could now appoint only one. During her tenure, a chapel collapsed.

She died on 22 February 1308 and was succeeded by Elisabeth von Matzingen.
