= Fides von Klingen =

Swiss abbess (died 1358)

- Died: 28 February 1358
- Occupation: Christian nun
- Position held: abbess (1340–1358)

Fides von Klingen (died 28 February 1358, Zurich) was a Swiss abbess. She led the Fraumünster Abbey and, effectively, Zurich itself for 18 years, from 1340 until her death.

== Biography ==
Her father was a baron named Walter. Initially a nun at the Fraumünster Abbey, Fides von Klingen was elected abbess at the end of 1340 in a contested election against Beatrix von Wolhusen. She thus succeeded Elisabeth von Matzingen. An arbitrator appointed by Emperor Louis IV had to intervene to decide in her favor.

Her reign was marked by difficulties, notably the Black Death, which struck Zurich in 1348, and the Bloody Night of Zurich in 1350. Furthermore, the city experienced an urban rebellion and abolished some of the abbey's privileges. She also altered the style used on the abbey's seals.

She died on 28 February 1358 in Zurich and was succeeded by Beatrix von Wolhusen.
