= Gross Aubrig =

Mountain in Switzerland

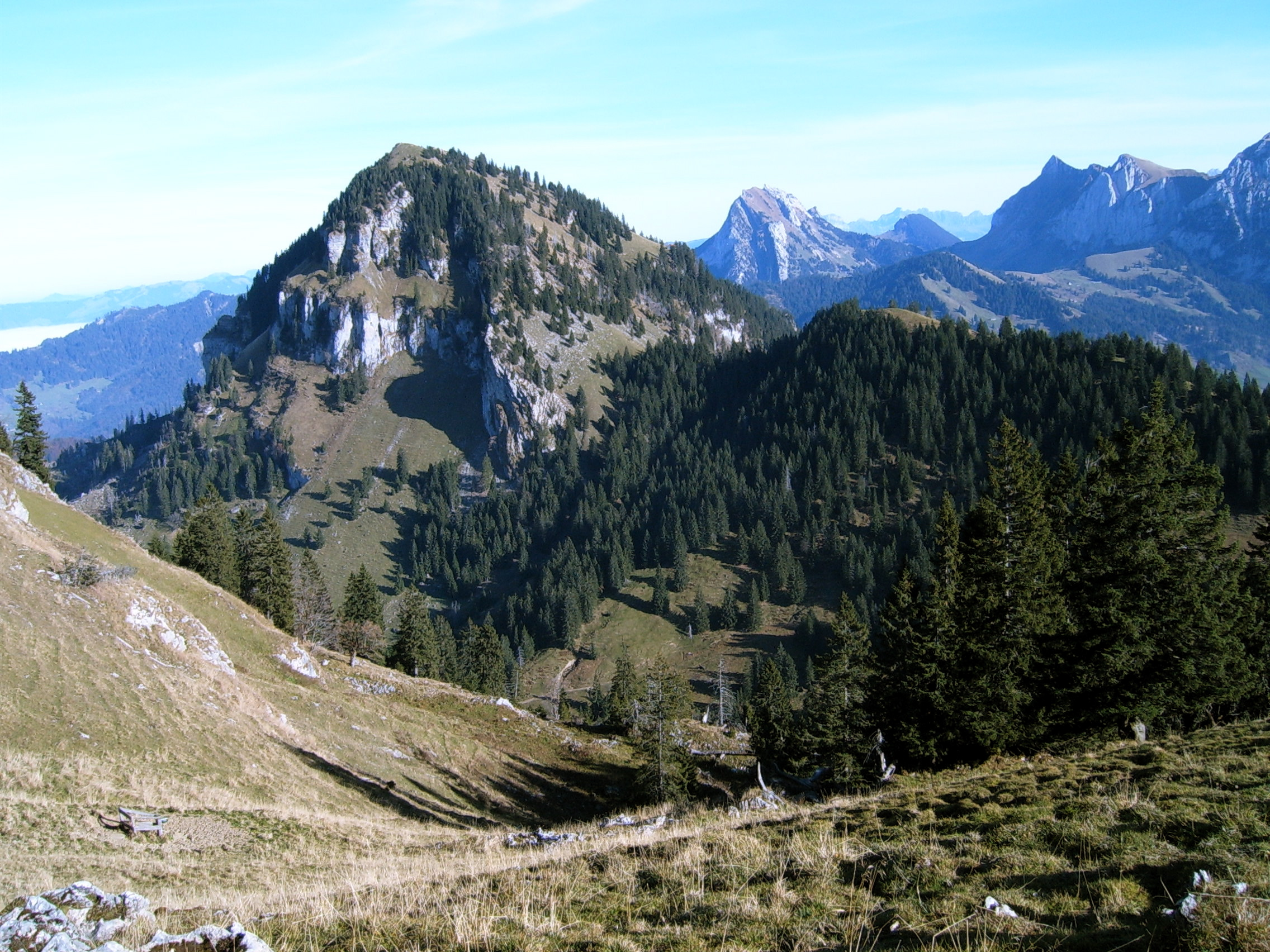
- View from the west side

Highest point
- Elevation: 1,695 m (5,561 ft)
- Prominence: 327 m (1,073 ft)
- Coordinates: 47°6′41″N 8°52′57″E

Geography
- Location within Switzerland Location within Canton of Schwyz
- Country: Switzerland
- Canton: Schwyz
- Parent range: Schwyzer Alps

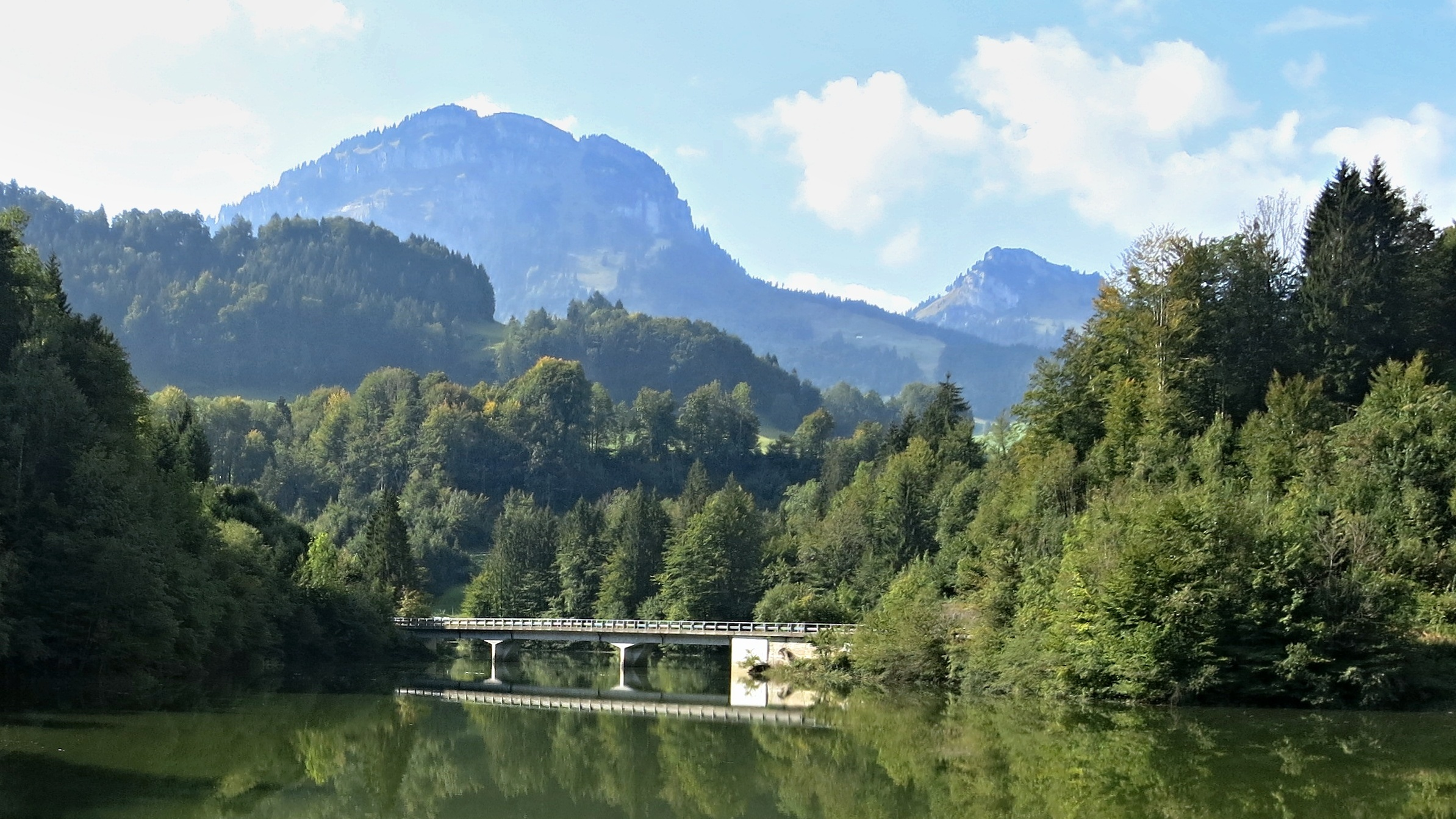
Gross Aubrig (left) and Chli Aubrig (right)

The Gross Aubrig (lit. 'Large Aubrig') is a mountain of the Schwyzer Alps, overlooking the lake of Wägital in the canton of Schwyz, Switzerland. Its summit lies at 1,695 m (5,561 ft) above sea level. Its child peak, the Chli Aubrig (1,642 m [5,387 ft]), is located to the west of it. The mountain lies north of the Fluebrig, on the range between the valley of the Sihl and the Wägital.

== See also ==
- List of mountains of the canton of Schwyz
