= Elisabeth von Matzingen =

Swiss abbess (died 1340)

- Born: Zurich
- Died: 10 August 1340
- Occupation: Christian nun
- Position held: abbess (1308–1340)

Elisabeth von Matzingen, (before 1289 - 10 August 1340, Zurich) was a Swiss abbess. She led the Fraumünster Abbey and, effectively, Zurich itself for 32 years, from 1308 until her death.

== Biography ==
Originally from a family of barons in Thurgau, she became known in Zurich starting in 1289, when she was mentioned as a nun at the Fraumünster Abbey. She became abbess in 1308, succeeding Elisabeth von Spiegelberg.

She oversaw the repair of the abbey church, which had been in poor condition since a fire in 1289. Some of her official acts are preserved, such as the agreement she reached in 1332 regarding tithes with a pastor.

She died on 10 August 1340, in Zurich and was succeeded by Fides von Klingen.
