= Einsiedeln =

- Municipality
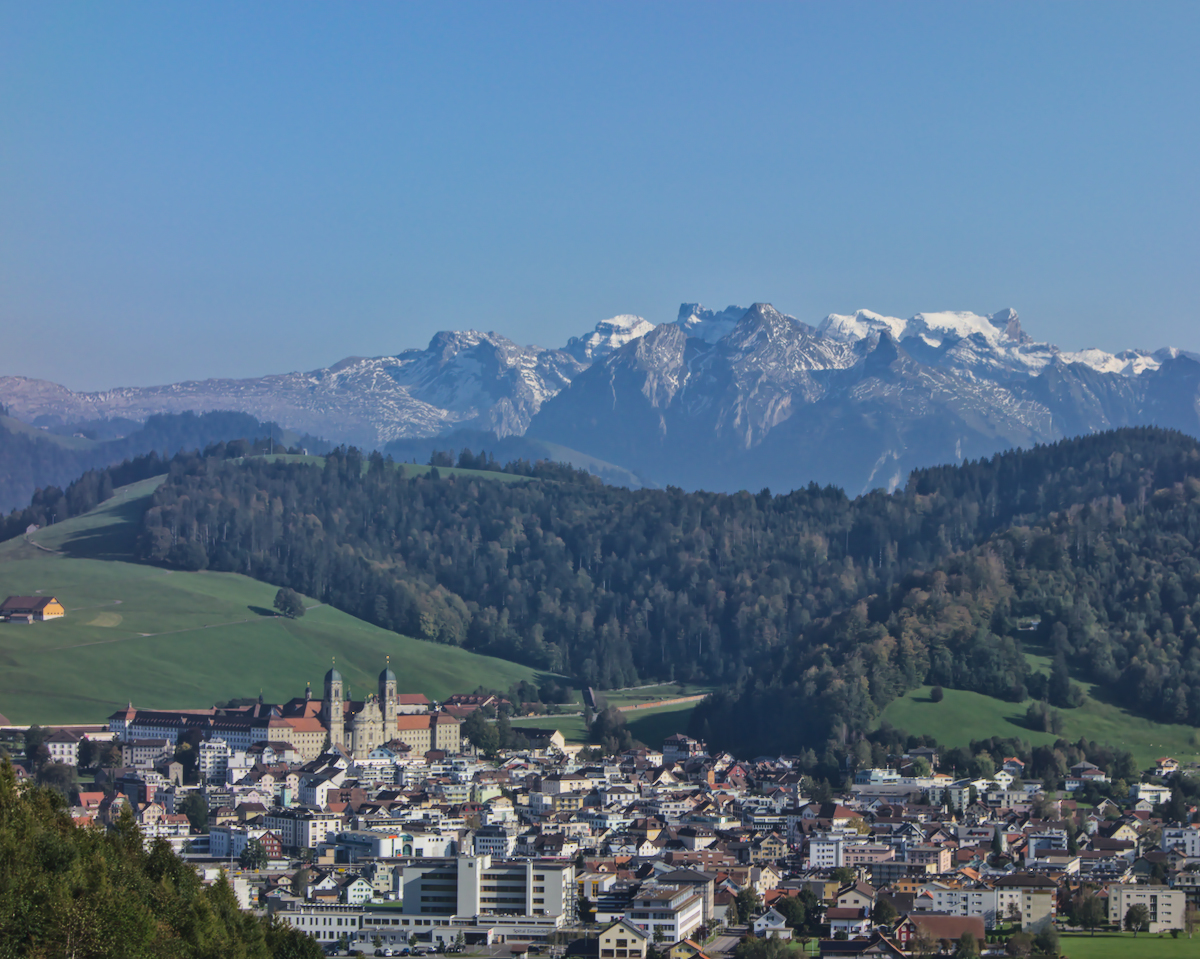
- Einsiedeln town with the Benedictine Abbey

- Flag Coat of arms
- Location of Einsiedeln
- Location within Switzerland Location within Canton of Schwyz
- Coordinates: 47°7′N 8°44′E
- Country: Switzerland
- Canton: Schwyz
- District: Einsiedeln

Area
  - Total: 99.1 km^{2} (38.3 sq mi)
- Elevation: 882 m (2,894 ft)

Population (December 2020)
  - Total: 16,247
  - Density: 164/km^{2} (425/sq mi)
- Time zone: UTC+01:00 (CET)
  - Summer (DST): UTC+02:00 (CEST)
- Postal code: 8840
- SFOS number: 1301
- ISO 3166 code: CH-SZ
- Localities: Bennau, Egg, Euthal, Gross, Trachslau, Willerzell and Biberbrugg (shared with the municipality Feusisberg)
- Surrounded by: Alpthal, Altendorf, Feusisberg, Freienbach, Innerthal, Oberägeri (ZG), Oberiberg, Rothenthurm, Unteriberg, Vorderthal
- Website: www.einsiedeln.ch

Einsiedeln (German pronunciation: [ˈaɪnziːdl̩n]) is a municipality and district in the canton of Schwyz in Switzerland known for its monastery, the Benedictine Einsiedeln Abbey, established in the 10th century.

== History ==
=== Early history ===
There was no permanent settlement in the area prior to the early medieval period, but numerous artefacts left by prehistoric hunters, dated to the Mesolithic to Bronze Age were recovered.

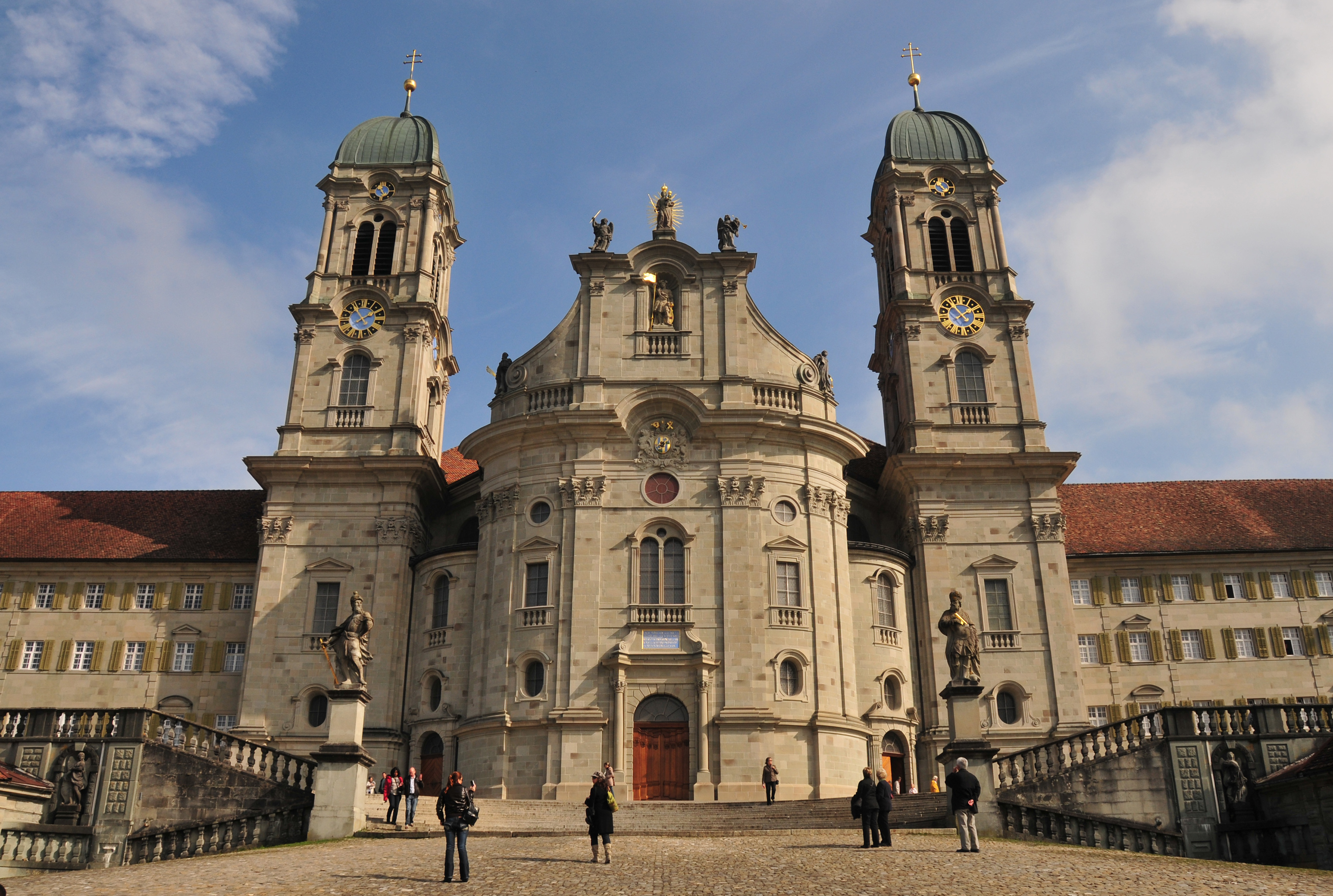
Einsiedeln Abbey (completed in 1746)

The original "hermitage" is associated with St. Meinrad, a Benedictine monk from the family of the Counts of Hohenzollern. According to legend, Meinrad lived on the slopes of Mt. Etzel from 835 until his death in 861.

During the next eighty years Saint Meinrad's hermitage was never without one or more hermits emulating his example. One of the hermits, named Eberhard, previously Provost of Strasburg, erected a monastery and church there, of which he became first abbot. Work on the monastery is said to have begun in 934. Following a miraculous vision by Eberhard, the new church was dedicated to the Virgin Mary. At the time of the foundation of the Abbey, the local hunters and small farmers of the forest, placed themselves under the authority of the noble-born Abbot. The surrounding population was known as Waldleute (forest people) because of the forests around the Abbey. The Abbey encouraged the Waldleute to settle in surrounding villages and begin farming. The settlement of Einsiedeln is first mentioned in 1073.

The alpine valleys were used to raise cattle, which became increasingly more important to the village. By 1250 the major business in the village was breeding and raising cattle. Expansion of grazing land into nearby alpine valleys led to a two century conflict with Schwyz.

=== Old Swiss Confederacy ===
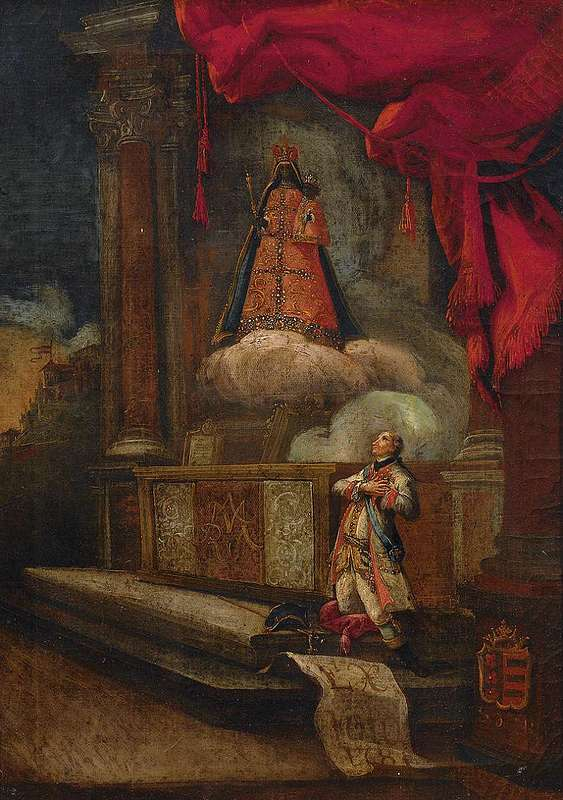
Painting showing a kneeling nobleman before the Black Madonna, 1781

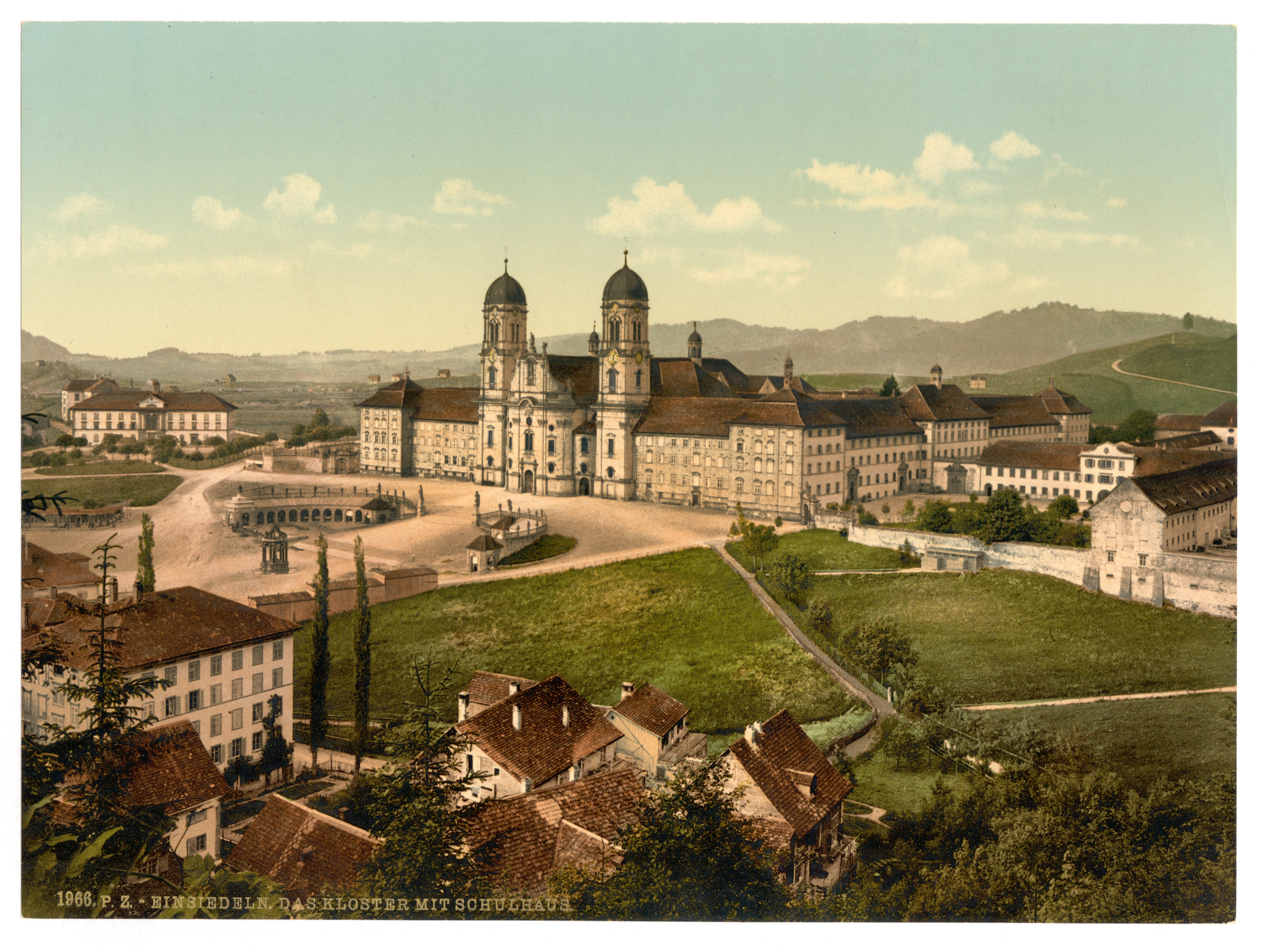
Einsiedeln in the year 1900

As early as 1100, the villages of Einsiedeln and Schwyz were in conflict over land near the two Mythen mountains. Over the following century, conflicts over the land led to many court battles and actual battles. In 1173 when the Habsburgs gained rights over the village of Schwyz and in 1283 when they raised the Abbey to an independent principality under the Habsburgs, this raised a local conflict into a regional one. The Habsburgs were able to quiet the conflict for a few years, until 1291 when Schwyz, Uri and Unterwalden revolted against the Habsburgs. In 1314 the conflict flared up again with an attack by Schwyz into Einsiedeln. This attack triggered a series of border raids that, along with other events, in 1315 led to a Habsburg invasion and their crushing defeat at the Battle of Morgarten. It wasn't until 1350 that the conflict was resolved and the borders between Einsiedeln and Schwyz were fixed.

In 1394 the Abbey came under the protection of Schwyz and the rights of high justice went over to Schwyz. Low justice though remained with the Abbey. Einsiedeln is the birthplace of Paracelsus, a Renaissance physician and alchemist who is credited with first naming zinc.

In 1399 the Drei Teile ("Three Parts": a council that included the Abbey, the Waldleute from the surrounding villages, and Schwyz) is first mentioned. Initially the Drei Teile only addressed any issues that affected the free Waldleute. In 1564 they were able to issue a binding ordinance for all three groups. In 1657 the Drei Teile changed its name to the "Session". The relationship between the three parties was not always smooth. In 1764, an attempt by the Abbot to require tradesmen to only practise their trade in Einsiedeln and preventing skilled workers from settling in among the Waldleute led to open conflict. Schwyz supported the Abbey against the Waldleute and in 1766 crushed the revolt. However, the Abbey lost much of its independence and thereafter was treated more as a subject of Schwyz instead of a partner.

=== Modern history ===
During the French invasion of Switzerland in 1798, the Abbey was suppressed for about three years and the land was added to the city of Schwyz. Following the collapse of the post-invasion Helvetic Republic, in 1803 as part of the Act of Mediation Einsiedeln became a Bezirk (or District) in the Canton of Schwyz. During the Restoration starting in 1815, the Abbey's power began to grow in the Canton. A desire for reform led the Districts of March, Küssnacht and Pfäffikon to declare themselves Kanton Schwyz äusseres Land (Canton of Schwyz, Outer Lands) with a liberal constitution in 1832. The Abbey stood on the side of the conservative faction in the Canton, which caused tense relations between them and the surrounding villages until the creation of the Federal State in 1848.

== Geography ==
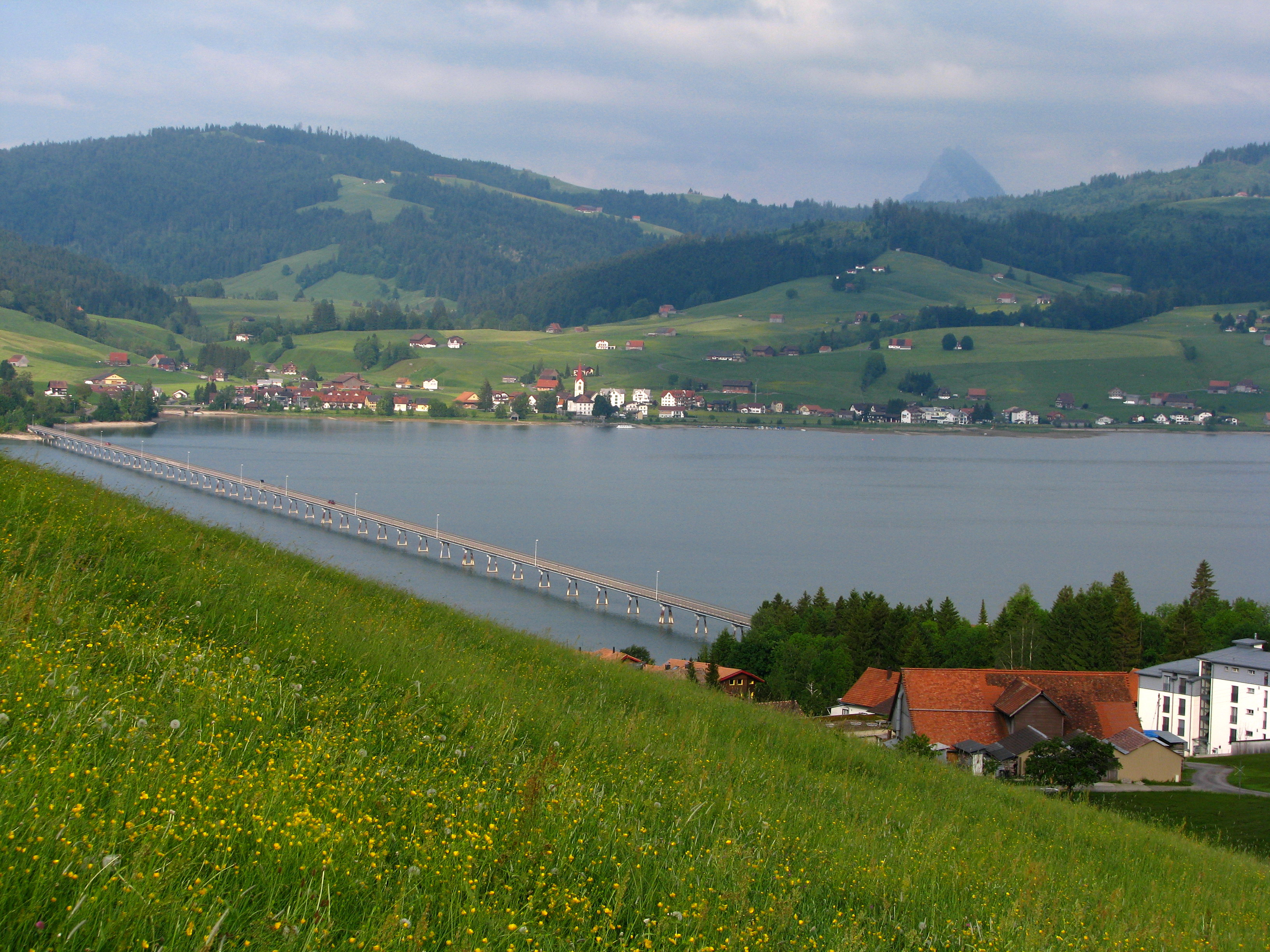
Village of Willerzell, Sihlsee in the background

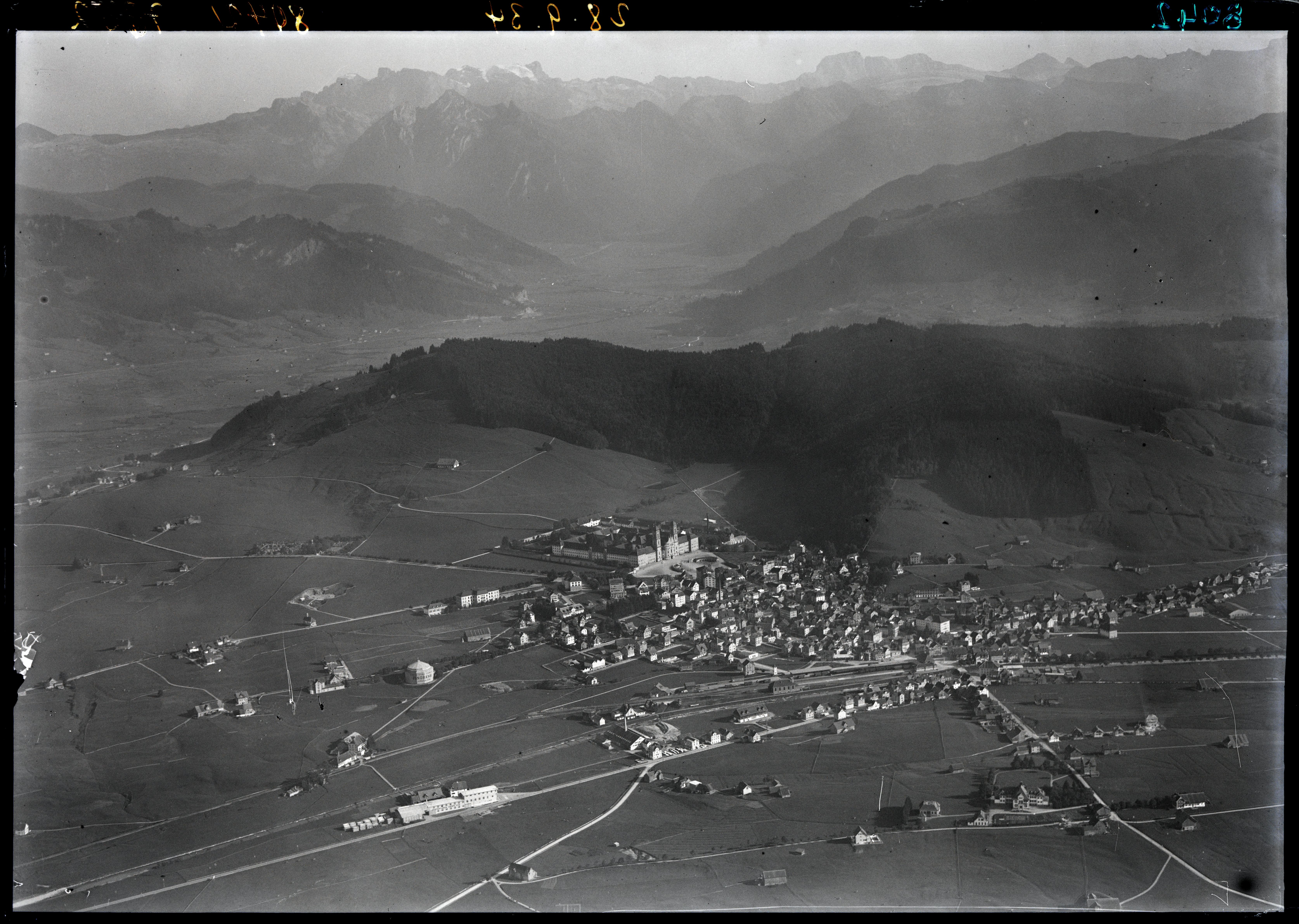
Aerial view by Walter Mittelholzer (1934)

Einsiedeln is situated in the valley of the Alp river. It comprises six localities: Bennau, Egg, Willerzell, Euthal, Gross and Trachslau. The village of Biberbrugg is shared with the municipality of Feusisberg. Einsiedeln has a total area of 99.1 km^{2} (38.3 sq mi), of which nearly half (47.1%) is agricultural and only slightly less (44.5%) is forested. The rest of the land is either settled (5.5%) or non-productive (less than 2.8%).

Einsiedeln is located approximately 7.5 km (4.7 mi) from the southern end of the Lake of Zurich, and 2 km (1.2 mi) west of the artificial Sihlsee lake. It is on a plateau (ca. 880 m (2,890 ft) above sea level). The town is located at an altitude of 470 m (1,540 ft) higher than Zürich, with which it has a railway connection.

Einsiedeln is also the capital and only municipality of the District of Einsiedeln.

== Demographics ==
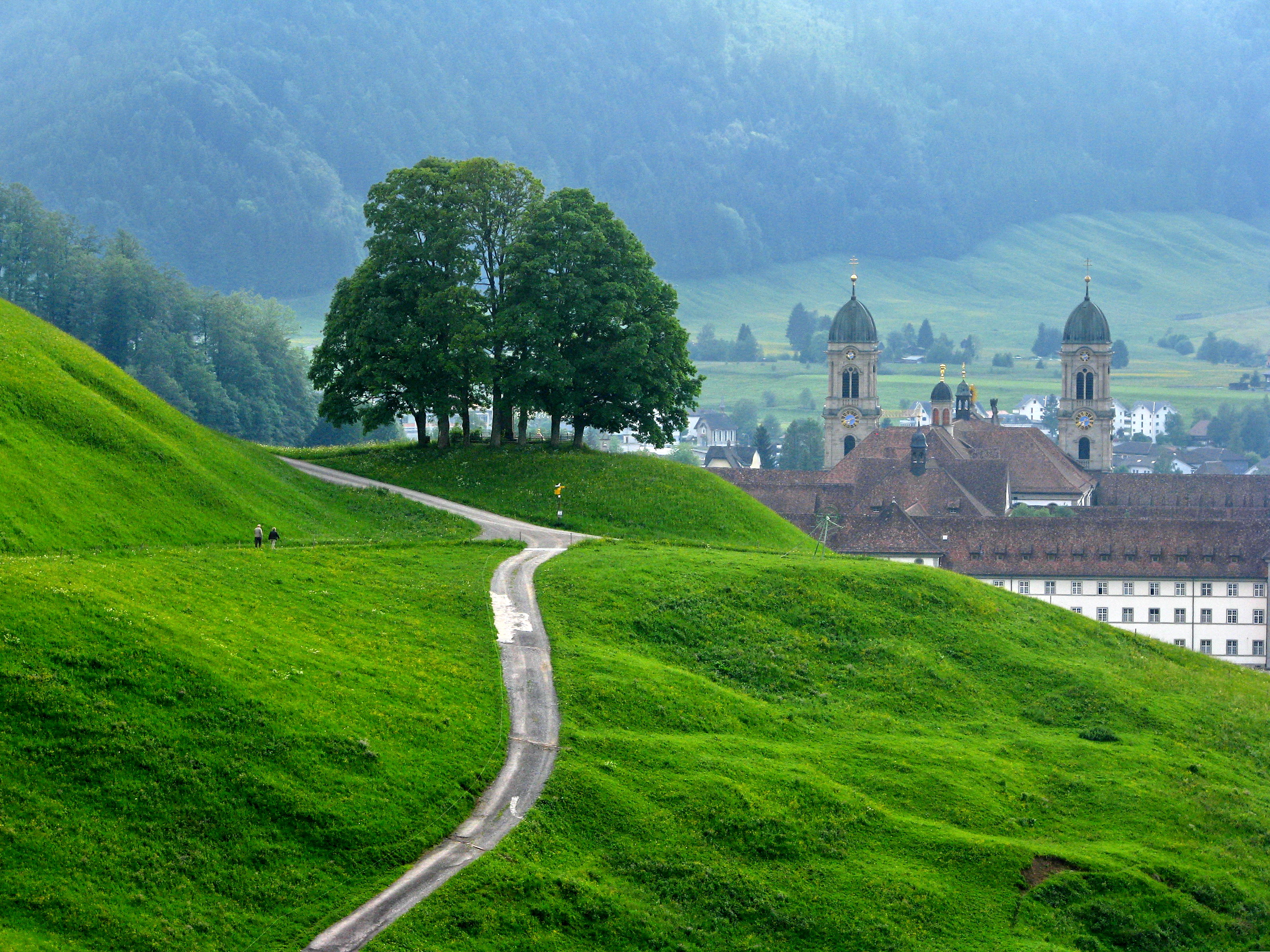
Hillside and alpine pastures near the town

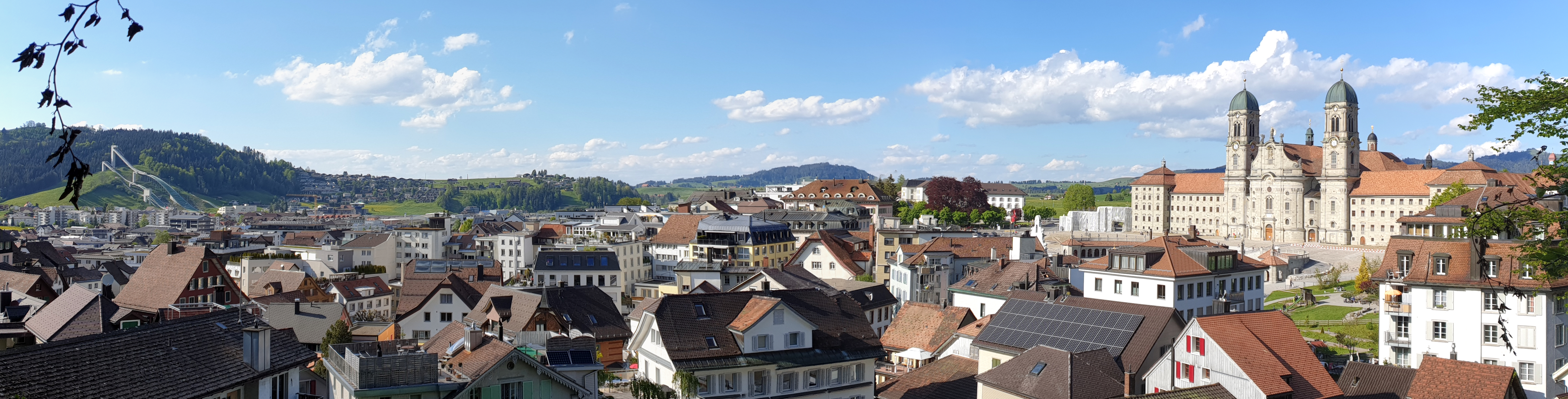
Town with abbey

Einsiedeln has a population (as of 31 December 2020) of 16,247. As of 2007, 13.4% of the population was made up of foreign nationals. Over the last 10 years the population has grown at a rate of 14.8%. Most of the population (as of 2000) speaks German (92.3%), with Serbo-Croatian being second most common (1.9%) and Albanian being third (1.4%).

As of 2000 the gender distribution of the population was 50.4% male and 49.6% female. The age distribution, as of 2008, in Einsiedeln is; 3,211 people or 25.4% of the population is between 0 and 19. 3,628 people or 28.7% are 20 to 39, and 3,964 people or 31.4% are 40 to 64. The senior population distribution is 1,009 people or 8.0% are 65 to 74. There are 609 people or 4.8% who are 70 to 79 and 201 people or 1.59% of the population who are over 80. There is one person in Einsiedeln who is over 100 years old.

As of 2000 there are 5,093 households, of which 1,649 households (or about 32.4%) contain only a single individual. 347 or about 6.8% are large households, with at least five members.

In the 2007 election the most popular party was the SVP which received 43.5% of the vote. The next three most popular parties were the CVP (18.8%), the FDP (17.7%) and the SPS (14.8%).

The entire Swiss population is generally well educated. In Einsiedeln about 66% of the population (between age 25–64) have completed either non-mandatory upper secondary education or additional higher education (either university or a Fachhochschule).

Einsiedeln has an unemployment rate of 1.29%. As of 2005, there were 551 people employed in the primary economic sector and about 209 businesses involved in this sector. 1,630 people are employed in the secondary sector and there are 199 businesses in this sector. 3,017 people are employed in the tertiary sector, with 486 businesses in this sector.

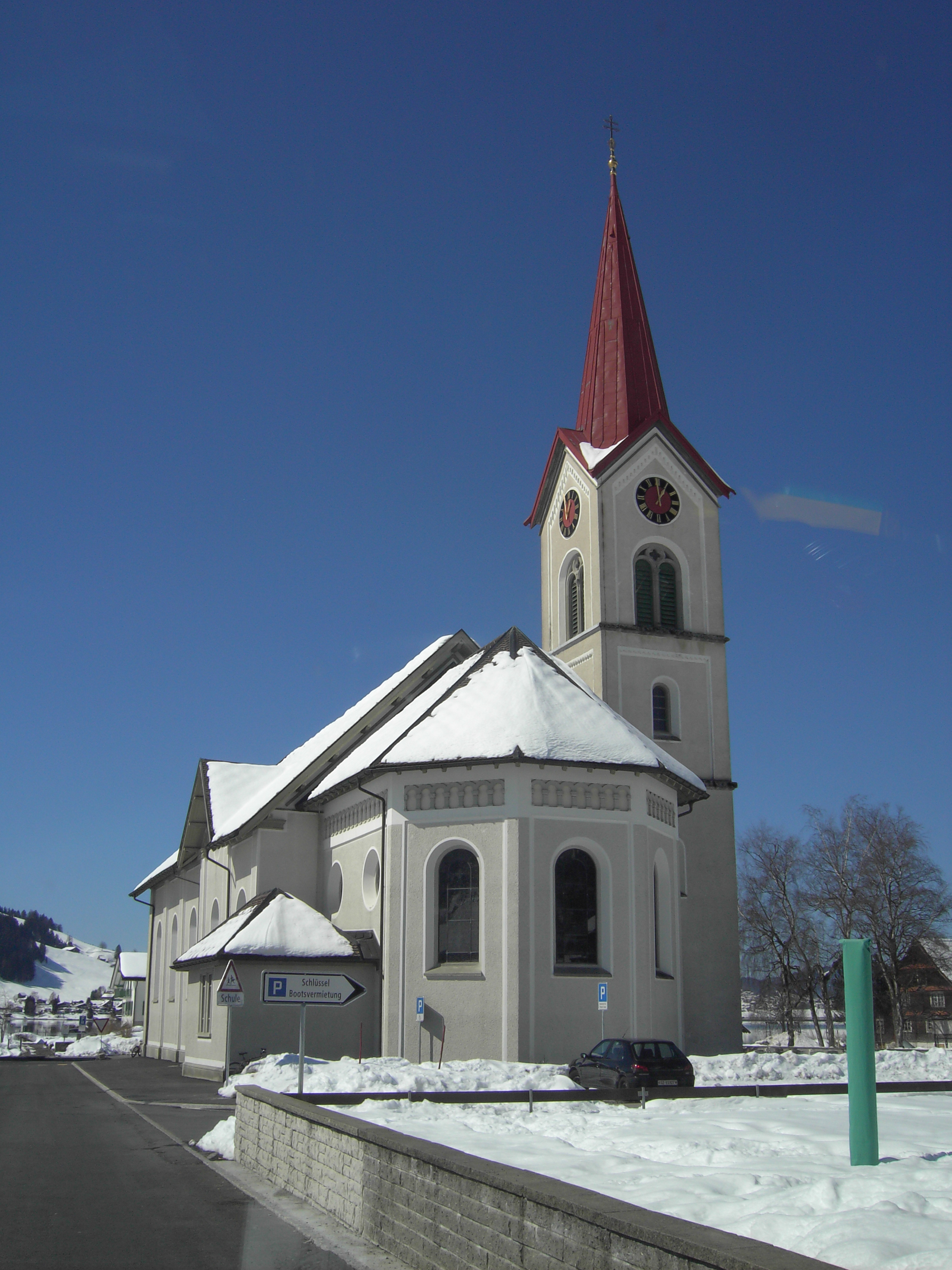
The Roman Catholic church of Willerzell

From the 2000 census, 9,834 or 77.9% are Roman Catholic, while 1,240 or 9.8% belonged to the Swiss Reformed Church. Of the rest of the population, there are less than 5 individuals who belong to the Christian Catholic faith, there are 288 individuals (or about 2.28% of the population) who belong to the Orthodox Church, and there are 5 individuals (or about 0.04% of the population) who belong to another Christian church. There are 332 (or about 2.63% of the population) who are Islamic. There are 106 individuals (or about 0.84% of the population) who belong to another church (not listed on the census), 486 (or about 3.85% of the population) belong to no church, are agnostic or atheist, and 329 individuals (or about 2.61% of the population) did not answer the question.

=== Historic population ===
The historical population is given in the following table:

year	population
1799	4,958
1850	6,821
1880	8,383
1900	8,496
1930	8,053
1950	8,423
1960	8,792
1970	10,020
1980	9,529
1985	9,783
1990	10,452
2000	12,421
2005	13,365
2007	13,768

== Transport ==
Einsiedeln is the terminal station of the Wädenswil–Einsiedeln railway and the Rapperswil-Einsiedeln railway, which are served by Zürich S-Bahn lines S13 and S40. Both lines are operated by Südostbahn (SOB).

At the nearby Biberbrugg junction station, there are connections to the InterRegio Voralpen Express to Lucerne and St. Gallen. At Wädenswil junction station, there are connections to services to Zürich.

== Climate ==
Between 1961 and 1990 Einsiedeln had an average of 156.7 days of rain per year and on average received 1,753 mm (69.0 in) of precipitation. The wettest month was June during which time Einsiedeln received an average of 206 mm (8.1 in) of precipitation. During this month there was precipitation for an average of 15.3 days. The month with the most days of precipitation was May, with an average of 15.3, but with only 158 mm (6.2 in) of precipitation. The driest month of the year was February with an average of 108 mm (4.3 in) of precipitation over 15.3 days.

Climate data for Einsiedeln, elevation 911 m (2,989 ft), (1991–2020)
Month	Jan	Feb	Mar	Apr	May	Jun	Jul	Aug	Sep	Oct	Nov	Dec	Year
Mean daily maximum °C (°F)	2.3 (36.1)	3.3 (37.9)	7.1 (44.8)	11.2 (52.2)	15.4 (59.7)	19.0 (66.2)	21.0 (69.8)	20.6 (69.1)	16.1 (61.0)	12.2 (54.0)	6.8 (44.2)	3.1 (37.6)	11.5 (52.7)
Daily mean °C (°F)	−1.5 (29.3)	−1.1 (30.0)	2.6 (36.7)	6.6 (43.9)	10.8 (51.4)	14.4 (57.9)	16.2 (61.2)	16.0 (60.8)	11.9 (53.4)	7.9 (46.2)	2.9 (37.2)	−0.4 (31.3)	7.2 (45.0)
Mean daily minimum °C (°F)	−5.3 (22.5)	−5.3 (22.5)	−1.8 (28.8)	1.8 (35.2)	6.0 (42.8)	9.7 (49.5)	11.6 (52.9)	11.4 (52.5)	7.7 (45.9)	4.1 (39.4)	−0.6 (30.9)	−4.0 (24.8)	2.9 (37.2)
Average precipitation mm (inches)	98.6 (3.88)	99.9 (3.93)	121.7 (4.79)	117.2 (4.61)	176.1 (6.93)	186.1 (7.33)	196.1 (7.72)	192.8 (7.59)	144.4 (5.69)	114.7 (4.52)	114.9 (4.52)	127.5 (5.02)	1,690 (66.54)
Average snowfall cm (inches)	50.1 (19.7)	64.2 (25.3)	41.3 (16.3)	19.6 (7.7)	1.4 (0.6)	0.0 (0.0)	0.0 (0.0)	0.0 (0.0)	0.1 (0.0)	4.4 (1.7)	30.3 (11.9)	53.0 (20.9)	264.4 (104.1)
Average precipitation days (≥ 1.0 mm)	12.1	11.2	13.3	12.1	14.5	14.8	14.3	13.1	11.6	10.7	11.5	13.3	152.5
Average snowy days (≥ 1.0 cm)	8.7	8.5	6.4	3.2	0.4	0.0	0.0	0.0	0.0	0.6	4.4	8.1	40.3
Average relative humidity (%)	85	82	80	76	78	77	76	78	83	84	86	86	81
Source 1: NOAA
Source 2: MeteoSwiss

== Sports ==
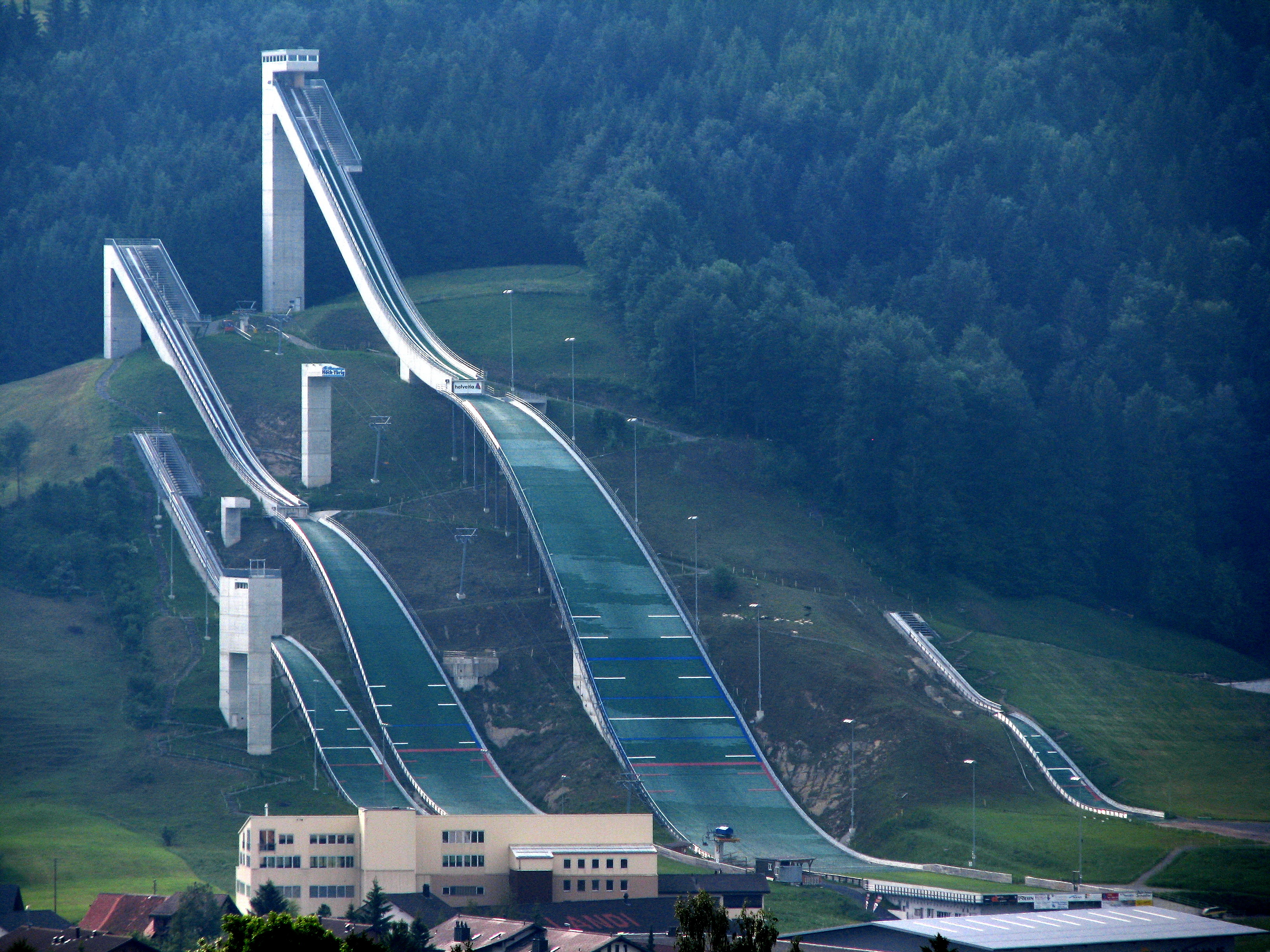
Schanzen Einsiedeln

Schanzen Einsiedeln is the national ski jumping venue of Switzerland.

== Tourism ==
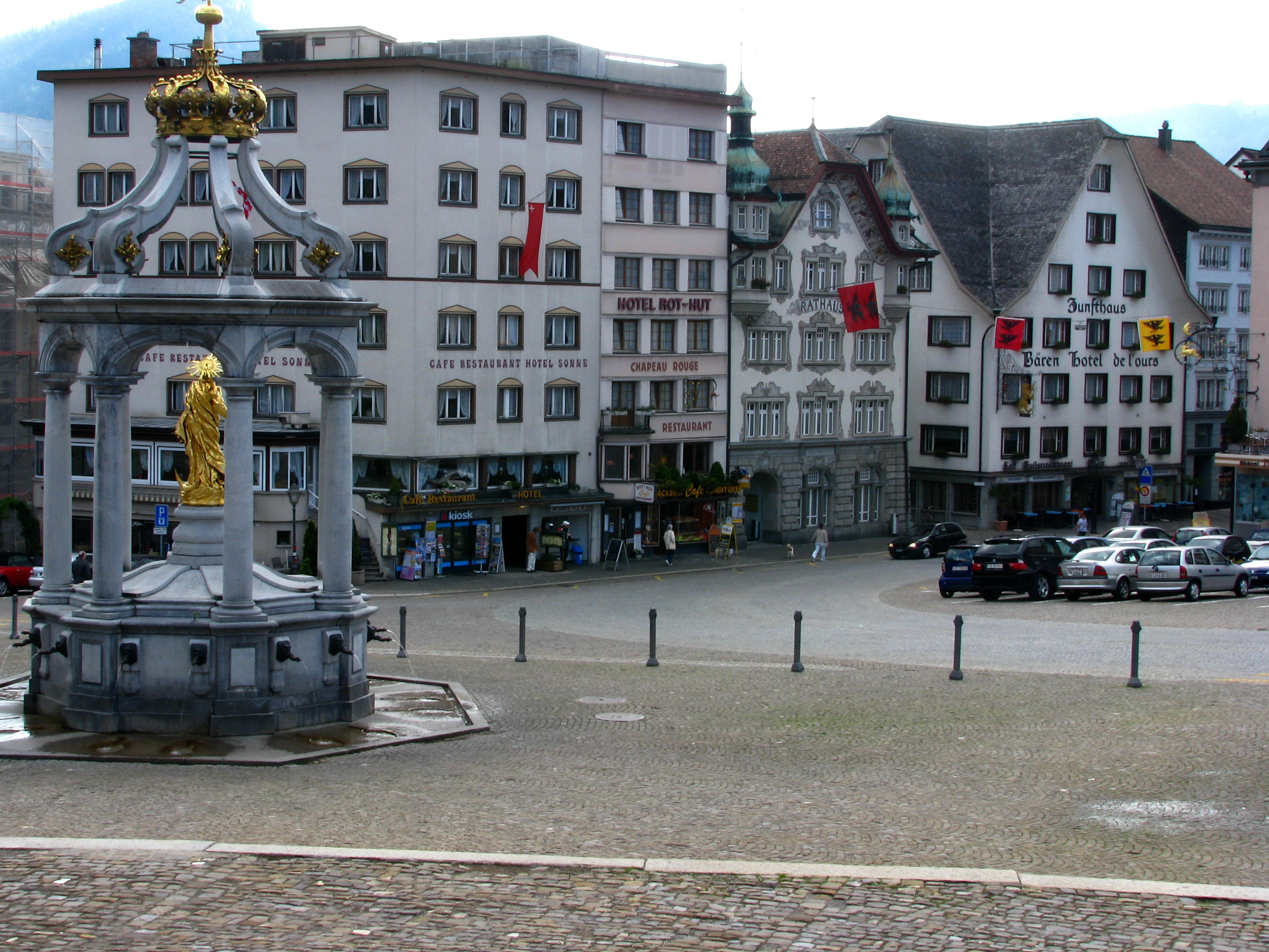
Main street of Einsiedeln, Abbey square in the foreground

The village of Einsiedeln is a popular tourist destination in central Switzerland. The Benedictine Einsiedeln Abbey, located within the village, is considered one of the most important Roman Catholic pilgrimage sites in Europe and is called "the most important place of pilgrimage dedicated to the Virgin Mary in Switzerland". In addition to the Abbey, Einsiedeln is also a popular destination for sports year round. The village has 3 ski areas which include lifts as well as ski jumps.

Since the Middle Ages the Graces Chapel and a statue of the Black Madonna have been the centerpiece of the pilgrimage. The statue is so famous that a copy can also be seen in the French Jura Mountains town of Pontarlier. Between 150,000 and 200,000 pilgrims visit the Graces Chapel each year.

Besides being a site for pilgrimages, Einsiedeln is a tourist destination for those interested in winter sports. The village has its own ski jump, ski lifts, ski tows and winter sports centres, which are in the nearby area of Hoch-Ybrig and Brunni. The Schwedentritt cross-country skiing trail starts next to the Einsiedeln Abbey.

The nearby reservoir, Sihlsee, is used in summer for swimming, surfing and sailing, and in the winter for ice-skating. The dam, which retains the lake, produces electricity for the trains and protects the city of Zürich further down the valley from the flood of the Sihl.

These days, fewer pilgrims come to Einsiedeln. For that reason, some of the former hotels have now closed. At the same time, the village has experienced a boom with day tourists, owing to the clear air and mountain views. Because of the high quality of life locally, the population is growing faster than is normal in Switzerland.

== Notable people ==
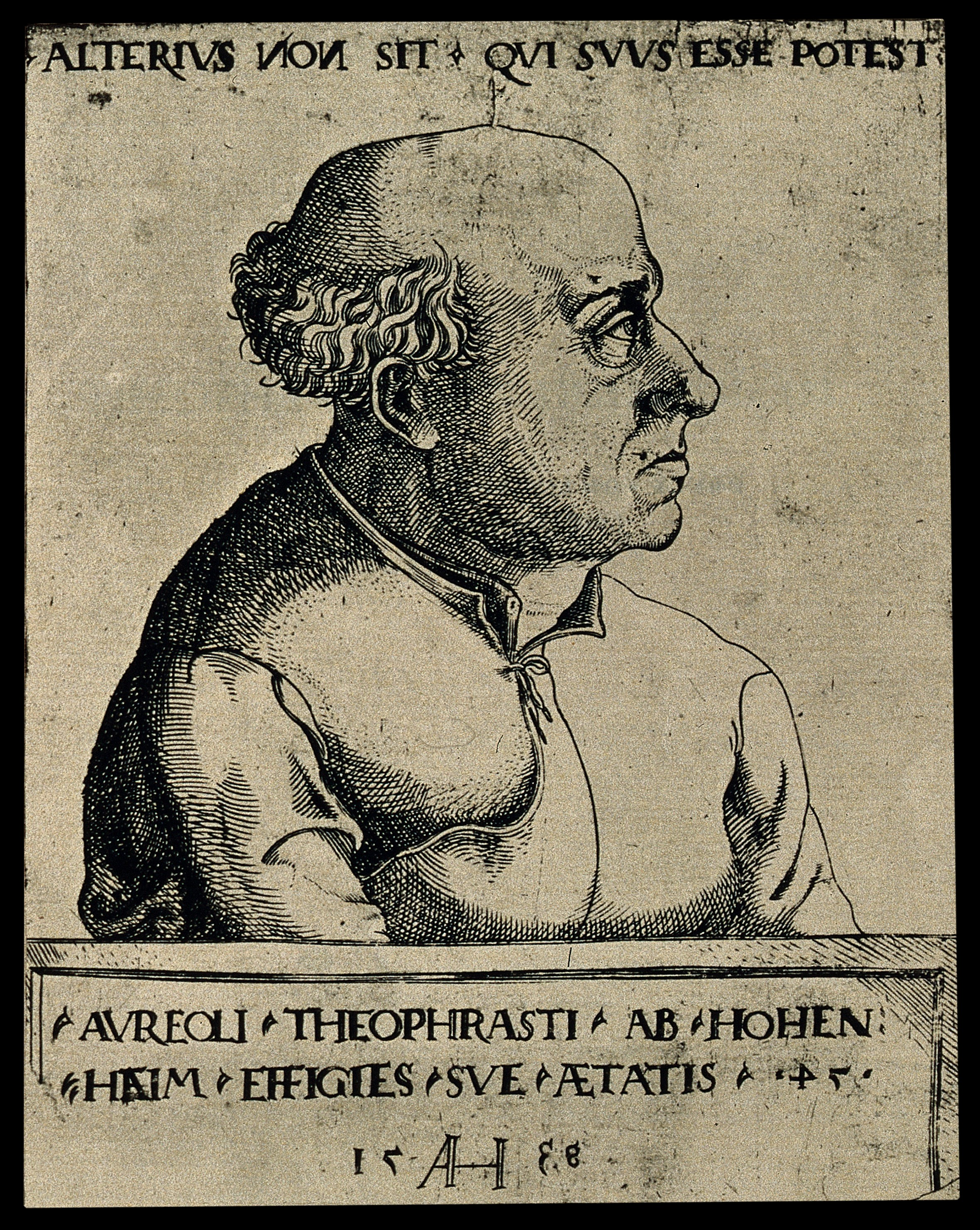
Paracelsus, etching from 1538

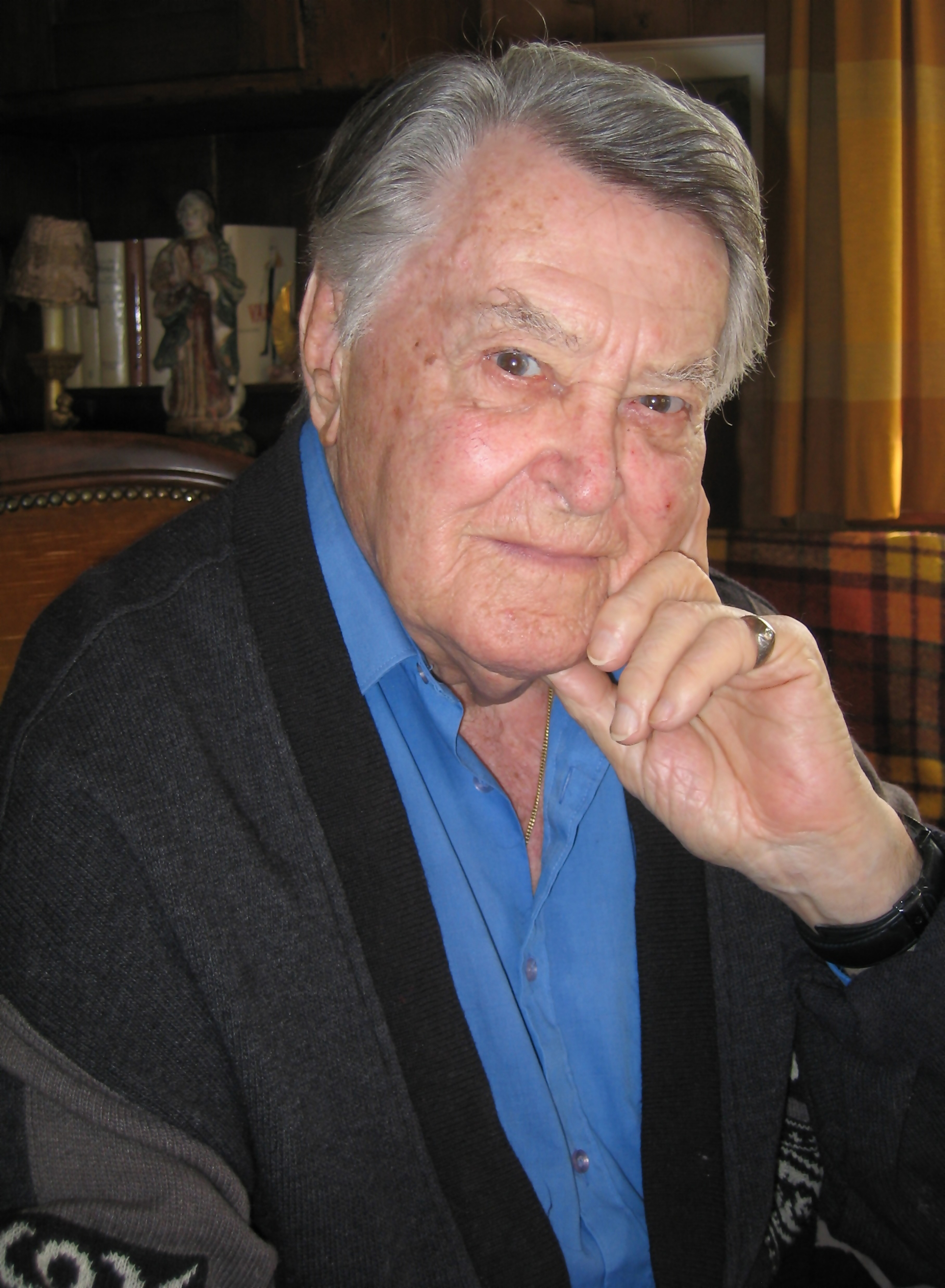
Artur Beul, 2007

- Johann Baptist Babel (1716–1799), preeminent sculptor of Baroque era, settled in Einsiedeln in 1746
- Aloysius Maria Benziger (1864–1942), a Swiss Catholic bishop and pioneer missionary, He served as the Bishop of Quilon, India
- Joseph Charles Benziger (1762–1841) founded the Catholic publishing house RCL Benziger
- Meinrada Josefa Benziger (1835–1908), Swiss businesswoman, philanthropist
- Artur Beul (1915–2010), a Swiss songwriter
- Albrecht von Bonstetten (c.1443 – c.1504), a Swiss humanist, entered Einsiedeln Abbey at a young age, made deacon of Einsiedeln in 1469
- Eric Honegger (born 1946), a Swiss politician and businessman, lives in Einsiedeln
- Josef Benedikt Kuriger (1754–1819), sculptor, goldsmith
- Meinrad Lienert (1865–1933), a Swiss writer, poet, journalist and editor
- Gall Morel (1803 - Einsiedeln Abbey 1872), a poet, scholar, aesthete and educationist
- Paracelsus (1493 in Egg – 1541), physician, alchemist and astrologer of the German Renaissance
- Milica Pavlović (born 1991), Serbian pop-folk singer
- Lee Scratch Perry (1936–2021), Jamaican record producer and musician

Sport

- Marcel Fässler (born 1976), a Swiss professional racing driver.
- Andreas Küttel (born 1979), a Swiss former Ski Jumper "World Champion 2009"
- Josef Wehrli (born 1954), a Swiss former professional racing cyclist
