= Sihlsee =

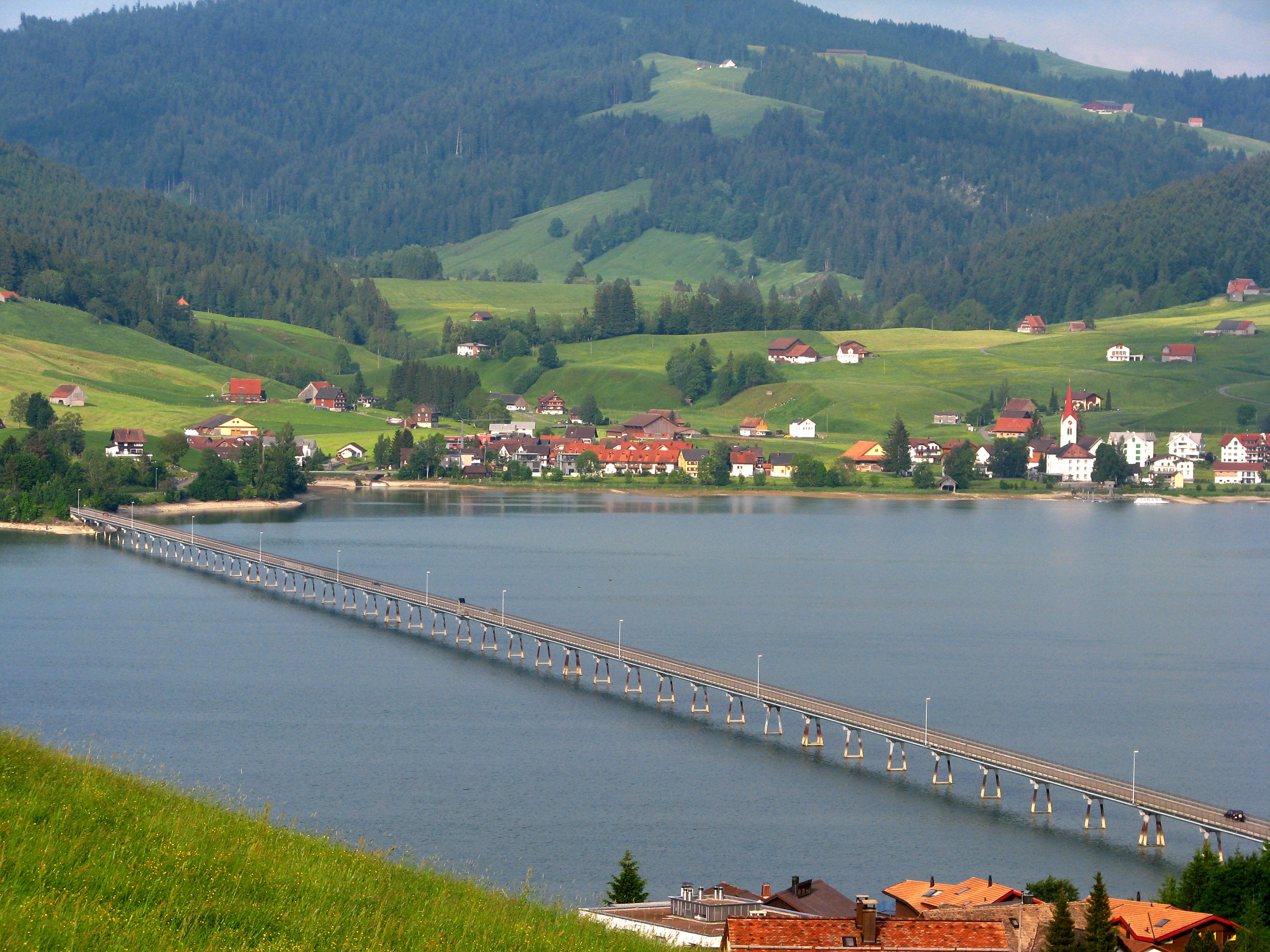

- Location within Canton of Schwyz Location within Switzerland Location within Alps
- Interactive map of Sihlsee
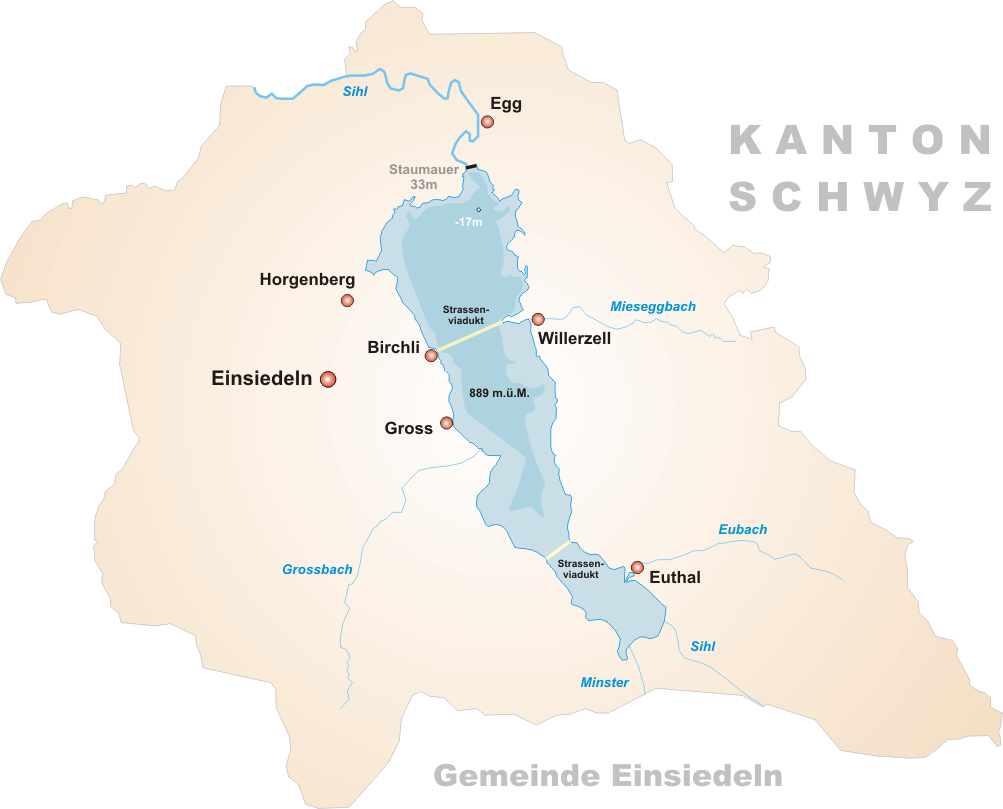
- Map
- Location: Canton of Schwyz
- Coordinates: 47°07′N 8°47′E
- Type: reservoir
- Primary inflows: Sihl, Minster
- Primary outflows: Sihl
- Basin countries: Switzerland
- Max. length: 8.5 kilometres (5 mi)
- Max. width: 2.5 kilometres (2 mi)
- Surface area: 11.3 km^{2} (4.4 sq mi)
- Max. depth: 17 metres (56 ft)
- Water volume: 96 million cubic metres (78,000 acre⋅ft)
- Surface elevation: 889 metres (2,917 ft)
- Settlements: Gross, Willerzell, Birchli, Euthal

The Sihlsee (German pronunciation: [ˈziːlˌzeː]; in English sometimes called Lake Sihl) is an artificial lake in the Swiss canton of Schwyz, near the town of Einsiedeln. The lake was created by damming the river Sihl and flooding a section of the upper Sihl Valley.

The lake feeds the Etzelwerk power station, which is located 5 kilometres (3 mi) to the north-east in Altendorf on the upper section of Lake Zürich (the Obersee) and which supplies electricity to the Swiss Federal Railways (SBB). Its concrete dam is 33 metres (108 ft) high and 124 metres (407 ft) m long. The lake is the largest artificial lake of Switzerland in terms of surface with a maximum length of 8.5 kilometres (5 mi) and maximum width of 2.5 kilometres (2 mi). The maximum depth is 17 metres (56 ft), and the lake has an approximate volume of 96,000,000 m^{3} (3.4×10^{9} cu ft).

The power plant project started in 1932. A concrete dam and two viaducts over the lake were built before 1937 when the valley was flooded. As a result 107 farms disappeared completely and 1762 persons had to leave their homes.

A failure of the dam could lead, according to studies, to an 8-metre (26 ft) high flood wave through the lower Sihl Valley reaching the Altstadt of the city of Zürich, the biggest city in Switzerland, within 2 hours. This threat has led the City of Zürich to develop, publish and test evacuation plans for the affected areas of the city, and especially the area around Zürich Hauptbahnhof railway station.

== Gallery ==
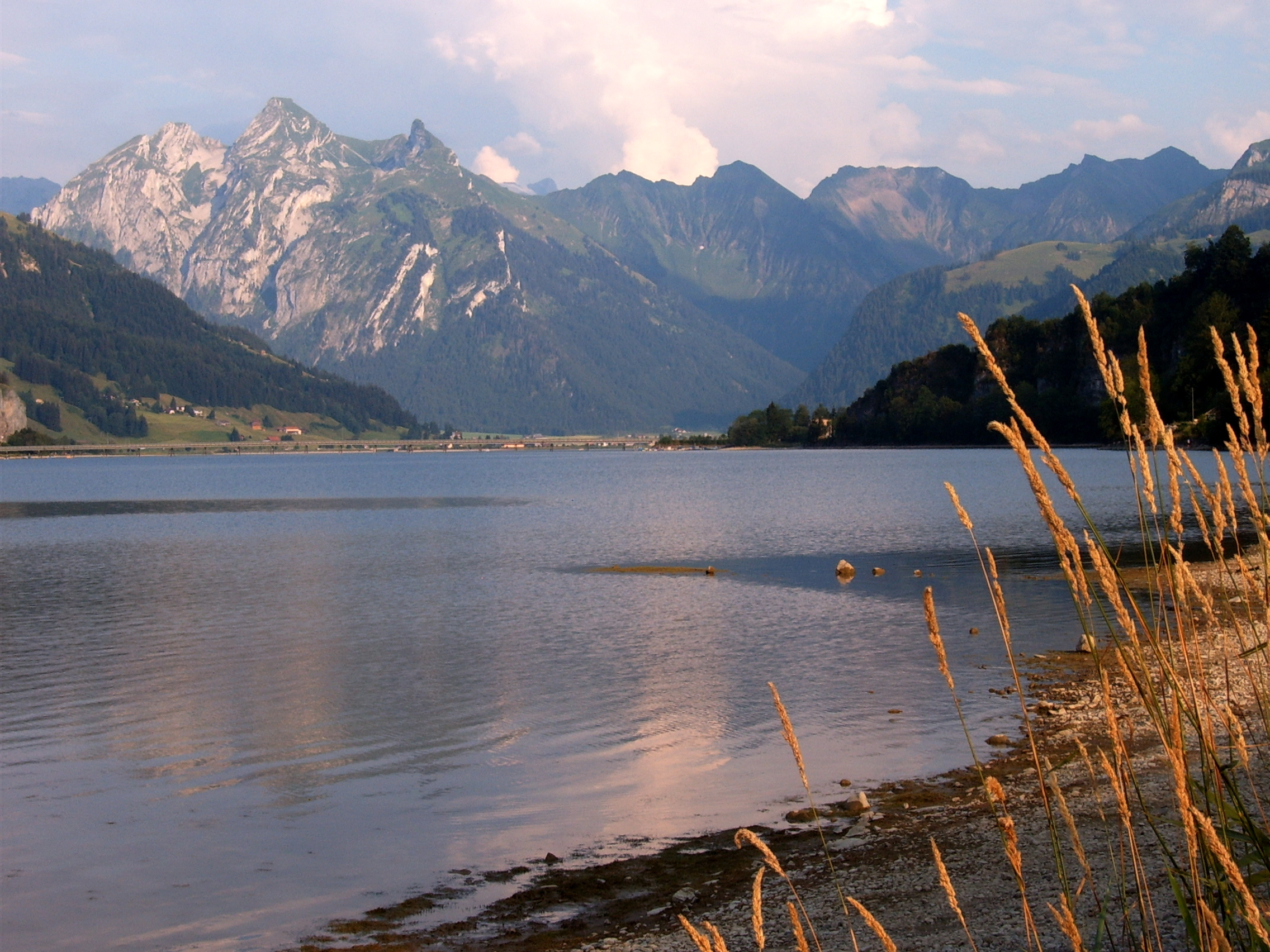
Sihlsee with Fluebrig behind

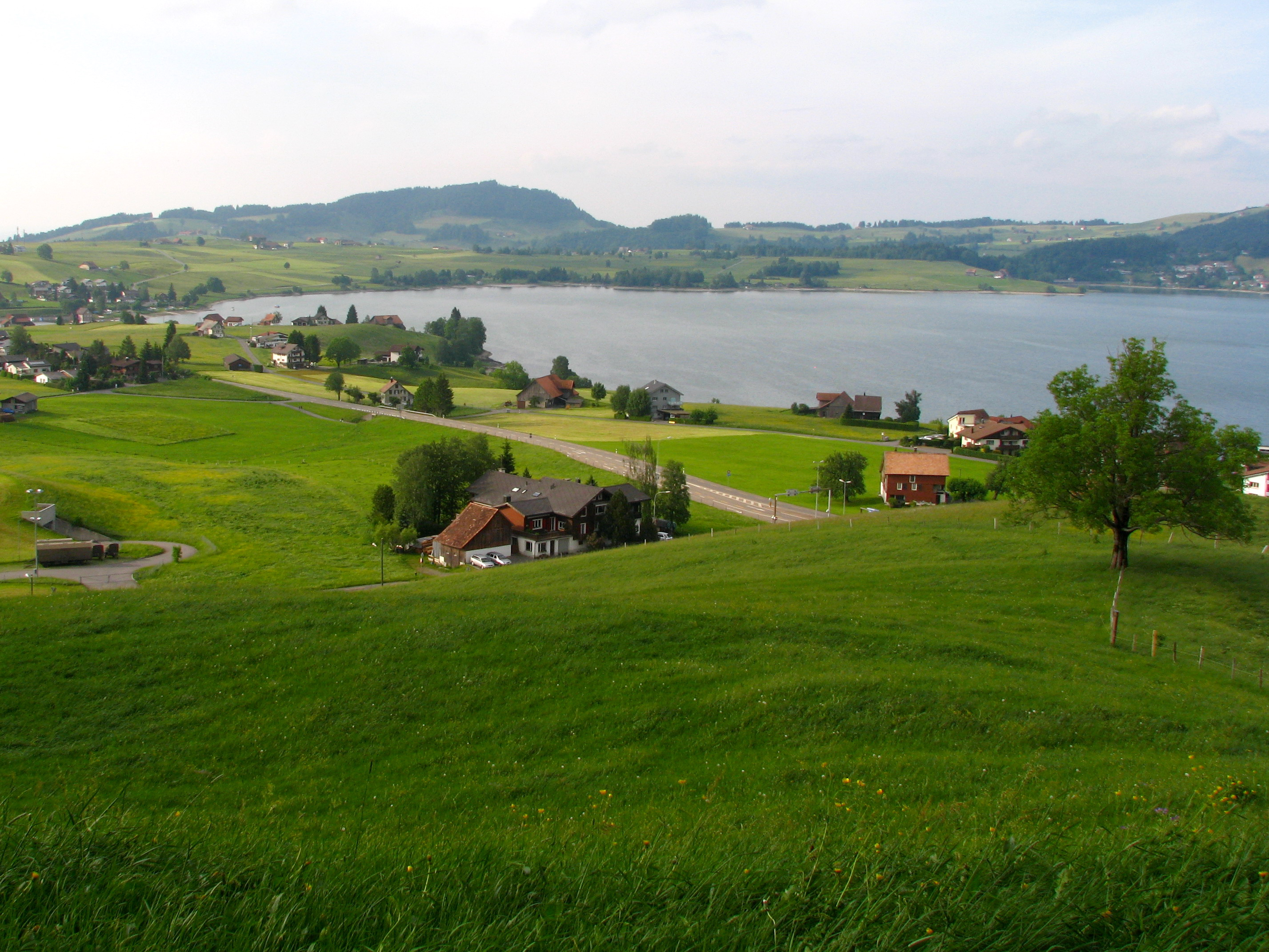
The northern shore
