= Rotenfluh =

Mountain in Switzerland

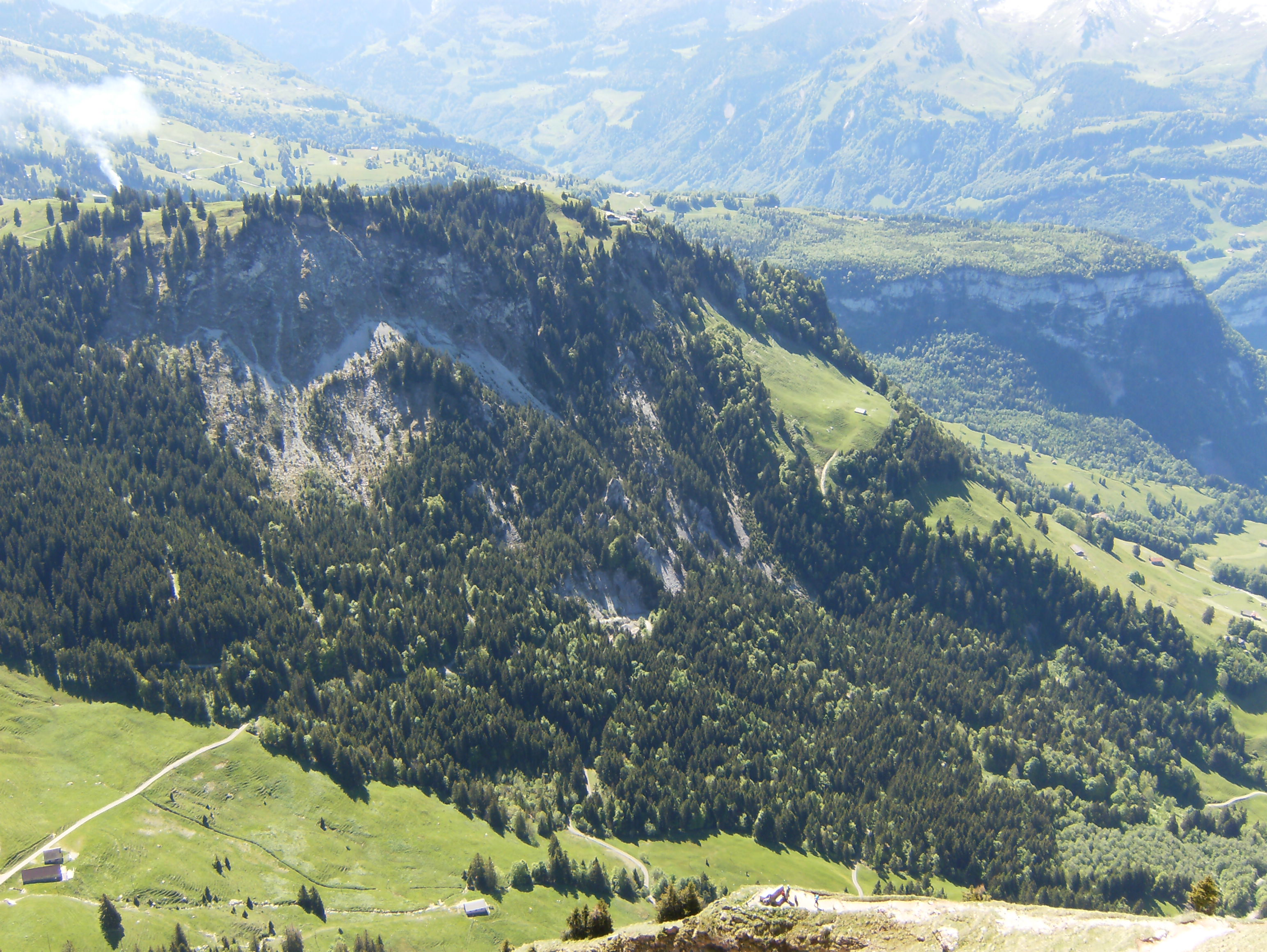
- View of Rotenfluh from the Grosser Mythen

Highest point
- Elevation: 1,571 m (5,154 ft)
- Prominence: 144 m (472 ft)
- Parent peak: Furggelenstock
- Coordinates: 47°01′16″N 08°42′11″E

Geography
- Location within Switzerland Location within Canton of Schwyz
- Country: Switzerland
- Canton: Schwyz
- Parent range: Schwyzer Alps

The Rotenfluh (also spelled Rotenflue) is a mountain in the Swiss Prealps, located east of Schwyz in Central Switzerland. It is part of the range surrounding the valley of Alpthal, culminating at the Gross Mythen. The Rotenfluh is a popular vantage point over the Lake Lucerne region.

== Transport ==
The mountain is part of a ski area and is easily accessible from Rickenbach near Schwyz by the Rotenfluebahn. Unlike the previous cable car, which culminated at an elevation of 1,527 metres (5,010 ft), the current facility reaches a higher elevation, the upper station being within a few metres from the top. Several restaurants lie in the summit area. Buses link the valley station of the Rotenfluh cable car (Rotenfluebahn) with Schwyz railway station.

Nathalie Henseler is the CEO and chairman of the board of the Rotenfluebahn Mythenregion AG.

== See also ==
- List of mountains of Switzerland accessible by public transport
- List of mountains of the canton of Schwyz
