= Ibergeregg Pass =

Mountain pass in Schwyz, Switzerland

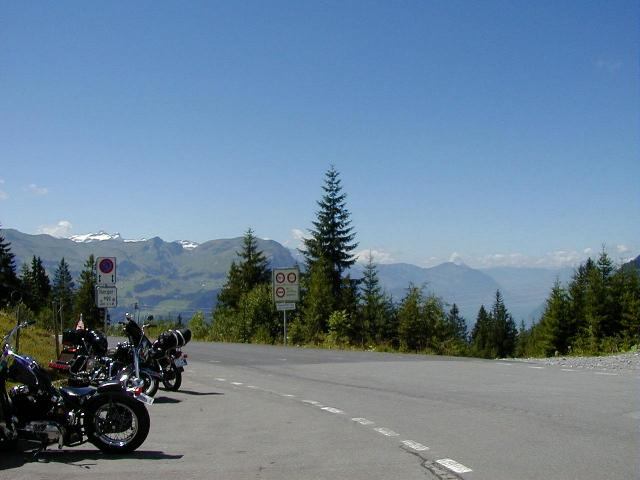
- Ibergeregg Pass

- Location within Alps
- Elevation: 1,406 metres (4,613 ft)
- Traversed by: Road

Third Approach
- Location: Switzerland
- Coordinates: 47°01′03″N 08°44′00″E

The Ibergeregg Pass is a mountain pass at an elevation 1,406 metres or 4,613 feet in the Swiss canton of Schwyz. The pass connects the town of Schwyz and village of Oberiberg, with onward links to Einsiedeln and the Sihlsee. The headwaters of the Minster, a tributary of the Sihl, are nearby, and the pass is flanked by the Alpine peaks of Furggelenstock and Firstspitz.

A mule track has crossed the pass since the Middle Ages, and the current paved road was constructed in 1873. The pass road has a maximum grade of 14 percent.

At the summit of the pass are an inn, a chapel, and a ski station. The area is a summer and winter resort, with skiing and hiking.

== See also ==
- List of highest paved roads in Europe
- List of mountain passes
- List of the highest Swiss passes
