= Schwyz =

Capital of Schwyz canton, Switzerland

- Municipality
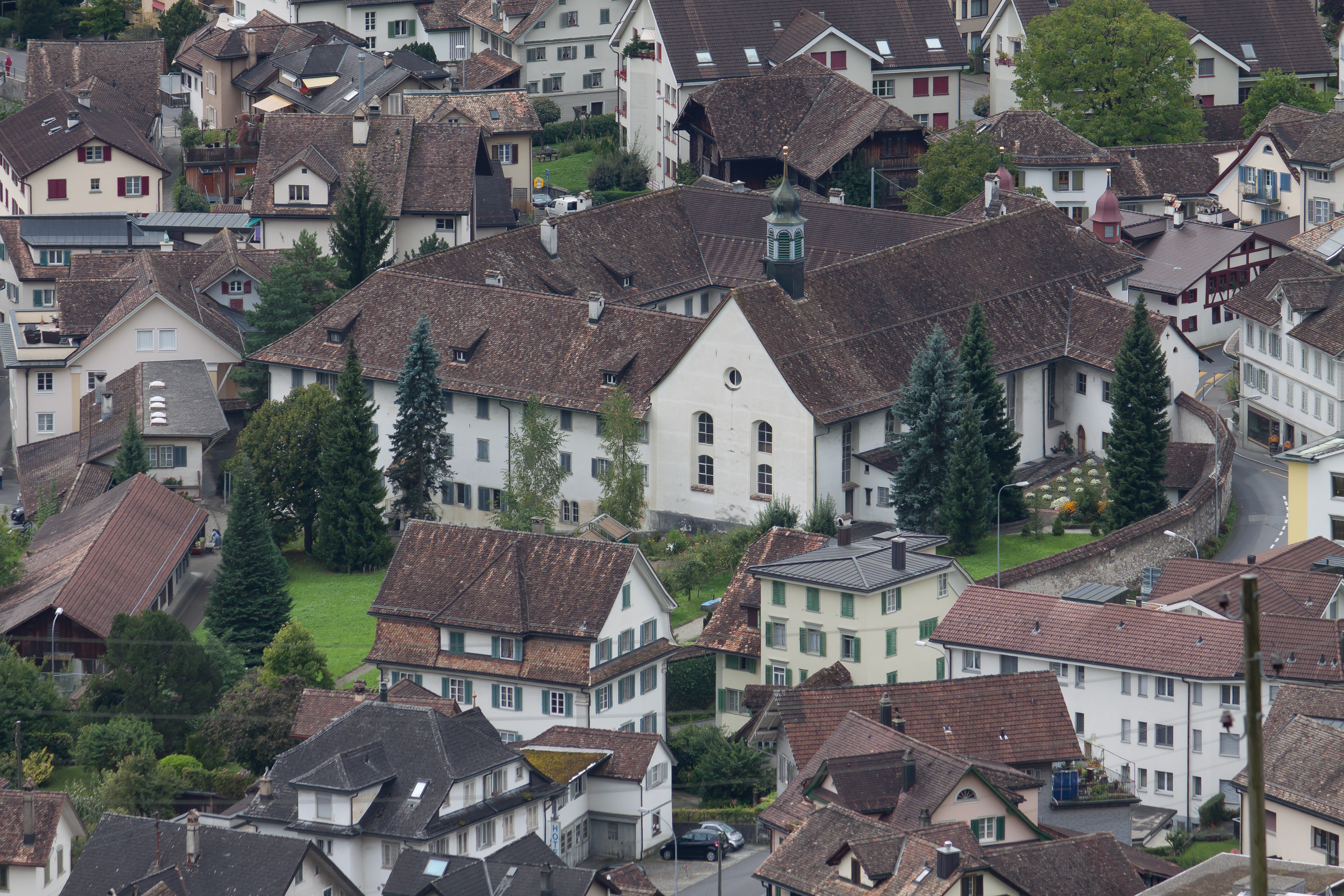

- Flag Coat of arms
- Location of Schwyz
- Location within Switzerland Location within Canton of Schwyz
- Coordinates: 47°1′N 8°39′E
- Country: Switzerland
- Canton: Schwyz
- District: Schwyz

Government
  - Mayor: Hugo Steiner SPS/PSS

Area
  - Total: 53.28 km^{2} (20.57 sq mi)
- Elevation: 516 m (1,693 ft)

Population (December 2020)
  - Total: 15,435
  - Density: 289.7/km^{2} (750.3/sq mi)
- Time zone: UTC+01:00 (CET)
  - Summer (DST): UTC+02:00 (CEST)
- Postal code: 6430
- SFOS number: 1372
- ISO 3166 code: CH-SZ
- Localities: Schwyz, Ibach, Seewen, Rickenbach
- Surrounded by: Alpthal, Illgau, Ingenbohl, Lauerz, Morschach, Muotathal, Oberiberg, Rothenthurm, Sattel, Steinen
- Website: www.schwyz.ch

Schwyz (German pronunciation: [ʃviːts]; French: Schwytz [ʃvits]; Italian: Svitto) is a town and the capital of the canton of Schwyz in Switzerland. It houses the Federal Charter of 1291 or Bundesbrief — the charter that eventually led to the foundation of Switzerland — at the Bundesbriefmuseum.

== Name ==
The earliest certain record of the name dates to 972, recorded in Medieval Latin as villa Suittes. There are a number of uncertain records dated between 924 and 960, in the form Swites (Suuites) and Switz. The name is recorded as Schwitz in the 13th century, and in the 17th to 18th century often as Schweitz. The name's etymology is uncertain. It was long presented as derived from the name of an eponymous founder in Swiss legend, one Suito or Switer, an explanation found in Swiss school textbooks until the first half of the 20th century. There is currently no consensus on the name's derivation. Isaac Wake, diplomat of King James VI and I in Bern, suggested in 1625 that the name originated in Sweden, among the Suecia, "who in the time of king [sic] Sigebert made a transmigration out of Suecia and planted themselves in this country". A Germanic etymology was suggested by Gatschet (1867), deriving the name from an Old High German verb suedan "to burn" (referring to slash-and-burn clearing of woodland for habitation). Brandstetter (1871) is critical of Gatschet's suggestion and prefers derivation from an Alemannic personal name in Svid- as it were presenting a scholarly defense of the Suito of the founding legend. The etymology proposed for the Schweizerisches Idiotikon by Hubschmied (1929) derives the name from a Gallo-Roman *(alpes) suētas, from the Gaulish or Latin word for "pig", via a Romance *suēdes "(mountain, pasture) of pigs" yielding an Alemannic Swītes. Hubschmied distanced himself from this opinion in 1961, preferring an unspecified pre-Roman (or "Etruscan") source. Sonderegger (1966) revisits Gatschet's suedan "slash-and-burn" proposal, but now claims derivation from a cognate Celtic root, *sveit-, Proto-Celtic *sveitos with a meaning of "clearing" or similar, giving Gaulish *Svētos (the long vowel as in Rēnos "Rhine"), Gallo-Romance *Svēdus, -is, and finally Swītes in Old High German by the 8th century.

The name Schwyz was extended to the area dominated by Schwyz (the Canton of Schwyz), and later to the entire Old Swiss Confederacy. Other cantons tended to resent this in the 15th century, but after 1499 the term Schwyzer was widely self-adopted, out of spite so to speak, since it had been employed as a term of abuse by the Swabian side during the Swabian War. Eidgenossenschaft and Schwytzerland (the origin of the English name Switzerland) could be used interchangeably as country names in the 16th century.

The Swiss German pronunciation [ʃviːts] is the same for the name of the town and that of the country (the two are distinguished only by use of the definite article for the latter, [ʃviːts] "Schwyz", [tʃviːts] "Switzerland"). The spelling of y for [iː] originates from the ligature ij in 15th-century handwriting.

== History ==
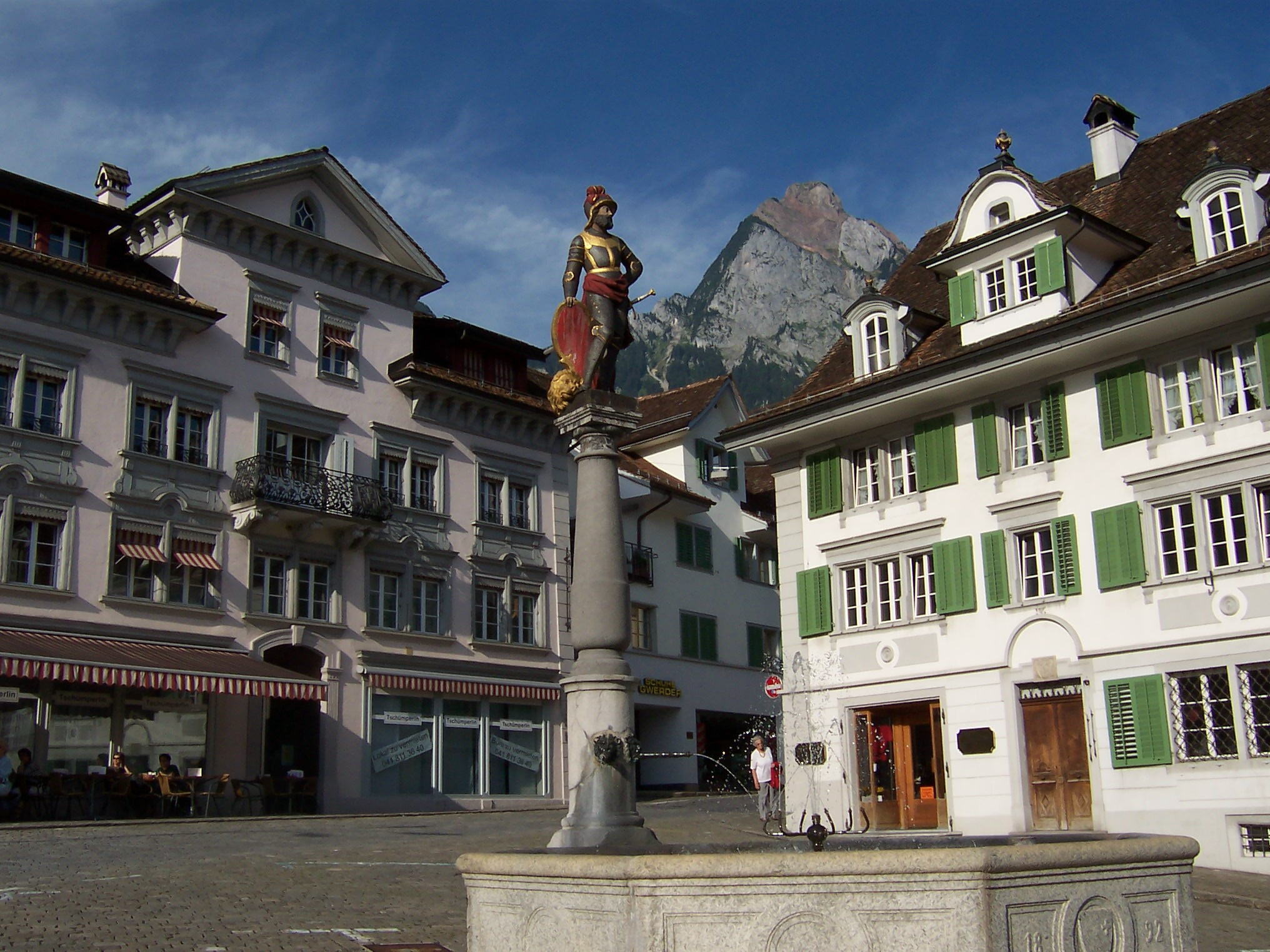
Fountain in the central plaza in Schwyz

Aerial view (1963)

While a few Roman era coins have been found in Schwyz, the earliest evidence of a settlement comes from the 8th century. The Alamanni cemetery at the parish church and the church itself are both from the first half of the 8th century. This first church was followed by a second ottonian church around 1000, which may have been destroyed by the 1117 Verona earthquake. In 1121 the third church building, a romanesque building, was consecrated. This was followed in the 15th century by the much larger fourth church which was destroyed, along with much of the village, by fire in 1642. The fifth church, an early baroque church was replaced because of serious structural defects by the current late baroque church which was dedicated in 1774.

Because Schwyz was the capital of a canton, many of the government organizations administered both the town and the canton at the same time, and the history of the town is closely tied to the history of the canton.

According to the chronicle of Johann Stumpf from 1548, the old town originally consisted of a village square, the church and its cemetery, the town hall, the inn, the archive tower and a number of scattered wooden houses. Around 1500, to distinguish it from the Canton of Schwyz, Schwyz town was often called Kilchgassen, which meant the village around the church but not the surrounding villages. The fire of 1642, which destroyed 47 buildings in the center of the village, allowed the town to be totally rebuilt. A new, larger town square with major roads radiating out was built in front of the new church and the new city hall. The houses were rebuilt as urban townhouses and a ring of about 30 large patrician farm houses grew up surrounding the village center.

== Geography ==
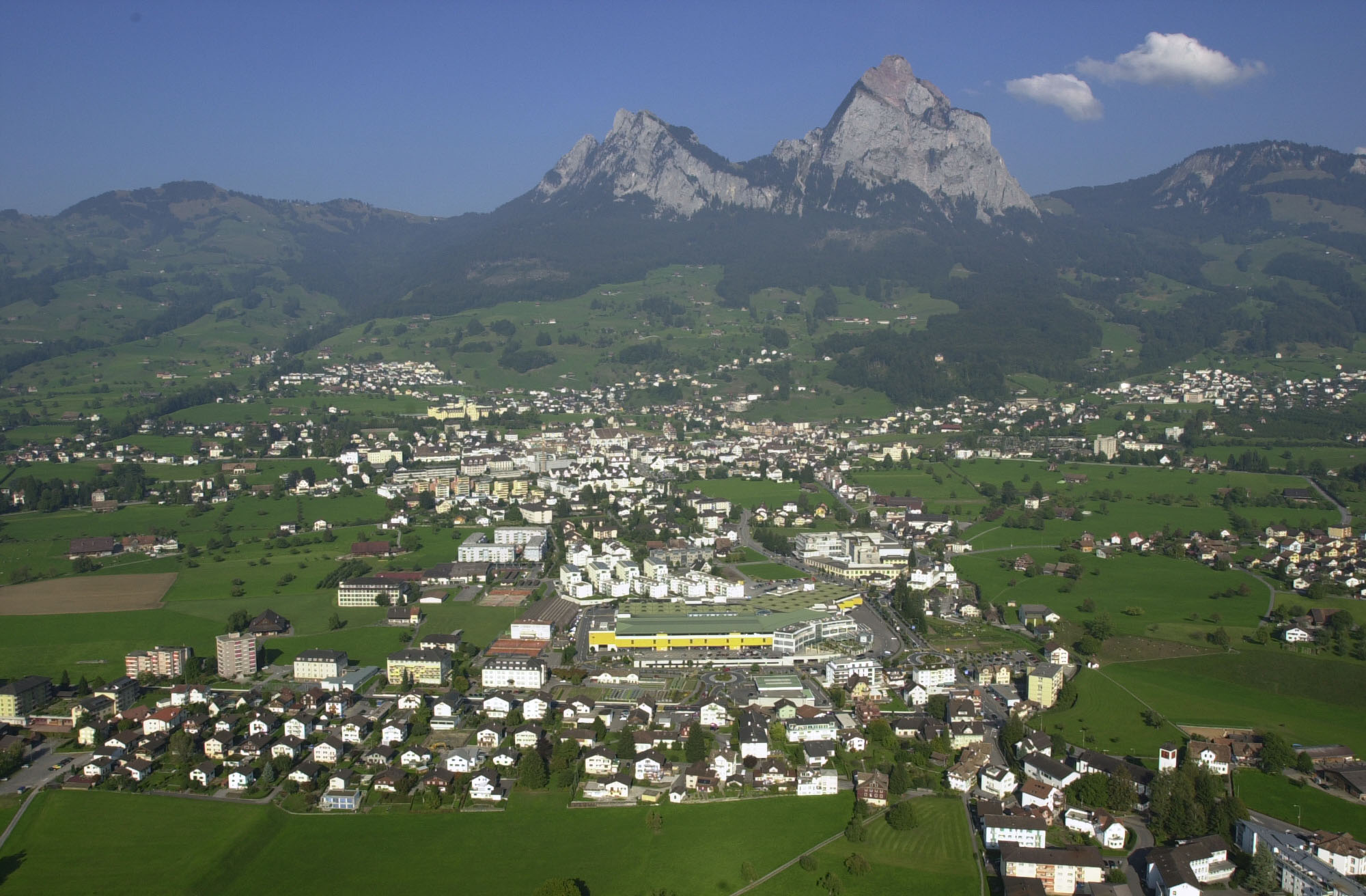
View of Schwyz town below the Mythen mountains

Besides the town of Schwyz, the municipality includes the settlements of Ibach, Seewen and Rickenbach. To the east, the municipality includes, or borders on, the mountains of Hochstuckli, Kleiner Mythen, Grosser Mythen, Rotenflue, and Furggelenstock. The river Muota flows out of these mountains and through the municipality on its way to Lake Lucerne. The Haggenegg Pass and Holzegg Pass both cross to Alpthal, whilst the Ibergeregg Pass crosses to Oberiberg.

Schwyz has an area, as of 2006, of 53.2 square kilometers (20.5 sq mi). Of this area, 46.4% is used for agricultural purposes, while 39.1% is forested. Of the rest of the land, 8.7% is settled (buildings or roads) and the remainder (5.8%) is non-productive (rivers, glaciers or mountains).

== Coat of arms ==
The blazon of the municipal coat of arms is Gules, a Confederate cross couped in the hoist argent.

== Demographics ==
Schwyz had a population (as of December 2020) of 15,435. As of 2008, 15.6% of the population were resident foreign nationals. Over the year 2010–2011 the population reduced by 0.6%. Migration accounted for −0.9%, while births and deaths accounted for 0.0%. Most of the population (as of 2000) speaks German (12,441 or 90.1%) as their first language, Serbo-Croatian is the second most common (378 or 2.7%) and Italian is the third (273 or 2.0%). There are 23 people who speak French and 25 people who speak Romansh.

As of 2008, the population was 49.9% male and 50.1% female. The population was made up of 5,824 Swiss men (42.2% of the population), 1,058 (7.7%) non-Swiss men, 5,932 Swiss women (43.0%) and 988 (7.2%) non-Swiss women. Of the population in the municipality, 6,681 or about 48.4% were born in Schwyz and lived there in 2000. There were 2,195 or 15.9% who were born in the same canton, while 2,780 or 20.1% were born somewhere else in Switzerland, and 1,797 or 13.0% were born outside of Switzerland.

As of 2000, children and teenagers (0–19 years old) make up 25.6% of the population, while adults (20–64 years old) make up 60.3% and seniors (over 64 years old) make up 14.1%.

As of 2000, there were 6,314 people who were single and never married in the municipality. There were 6,305 married individuals, 722 widows or widowers and 461 individuals who are divorced.

As of 2000, there were 5,250 private households in the municipality, and an average of 2.5 persons per household. There were 1,582 households that consist of only one person and 536 households with five or more people. In 2000, a total of 4,968 apartments (90.3% of the total) were permanently occupied, while 375 apartments (6.8%) were seasonally occupied and 156 apartments (2.8%) were empty. As of 2009, the construction rate of new housing units was 4.8 new units per 1000 residents.

As of 2003 the average price to rent an average apartment in Schwyz was 1185.58 Swiss francs (CHF) per month (US$950, £530, €760 approx. exchange rate from 2003). The average rate for a one-room apartment was 543.08 CHF (US$430, £240, €350), a two-room apartment was about 904.87 CHF (US$720, £410, €580), a three-room apartment was about 1068.78 CHF (US$860, £480, €680) and a six or more room apartment cost an average of 1461.34 CHF (US$1170, £660, €940). The average apartment price in Schwyz was 106.2% of the national average of 1116 CHF. The vacancy rate for the municipality, in 2010, was 0.25%.

== Historic population ==
The historical population is given in the following chart:

Historic Population Data
| Year | Total Population | German Speaking | Italian Speaking | Catholic | Protestant | Other | Jewish | Islamic | No religion given | Swiss | Non-Swiss |
|---|---|---|---|---|---|---|---|---|---|---|---|
| 1621 | 2,052 | | | | | | | | | | |
| 1669 | ca. 2,500 | | | | | | | | | | |
| 1743 | 4,639 | | | | | | | | | | |
| 1799 | 6,338 | | | | | | | | | | |
| 1802 | ca. 5,000 | | | | | | | | | | |
| 1837 | 5,225 | | | | | | | | | | |
| 1850 | 5,432 | | | 5,428 | 4 | | | | | 5,406 | 26 |
| 1870 | 6,137 | | | 6,114 | 38 | | | | | 5,987 | 167 |
| 1888 | 6,616 | 6,424 | 110 | 6,552 | 64 | 21 | | | | 6,380 | 236 |
| 1900 | 7,398 | 7,072 | 246 | 7,268 | 129 | 18 | 1 | | | 6,911 | 487 |
| 1910 | 8,000 | 7,549 | 352 | 7,807 | 184 | 48 | 3 | | | 7,399 | 601 |
| 1930 | 8,256 | 7,866 | 245 | 8,004 | 246 | 50 | | | | 7,830 | 426 |
| 1950 | 10,259 | 9,827 | 255 | 9,888 | 358 | 92 | 1 | | | 9,896 | 363 |
| 1970 | 12,194 | 11,206 | 744 | 11,615 | 501 | 209 | | 5 | 17 | 11,080 | 1,114 |
| 1990 | 12,872 | 11,530 | 453 | 11,420 | 667 | 849 | 3 | 225 | 160 | 11,319 | 1,553 |
| 2000 | 13,802 | 12,441 | 273 | 11,269 | 751 | 1,065 | 5 | 502 | 377 | 11,756 | 2,046 |

== Heritage sites of national significance ==
The Bundesbriefmuseum (Museum of the Swiss Charters of Confederation), the Dominican nuns Convent of St. Peter am Bach, the entire medieval and early modern settlement, the Hermitage and chapel, the Forum der Schweizer Geschichte (Forum of Swiss History), the Ab Yberg im Grund House, the Bethlehem House at Reichsstrasse 9, the Ceberg im Feldli house at Theodosiusweg 20, the house at Gotthardstrasse 99 in Ibach, the Grosshus at Strehlgasse 12, the Immenfeld house, the house at Langfeldweg 14 in Kaltbach, the house at Oberschönenbuch 79 in Ibach, the Herrenhaus Waldegg, the Hettlingerhäuser, the Hofstatt Ital Reding, the Catholic Parish Church of St. Martin, the Maihof, the Palais Büeler, the Rathaus (Town council house), the Reding House, the State Archives of Schwyz and the Köplihaus house are listed as a Swiss heritage site of national significance. The entire old city of Schwyz is part of the Inventory of Swiss Heritage Sites.

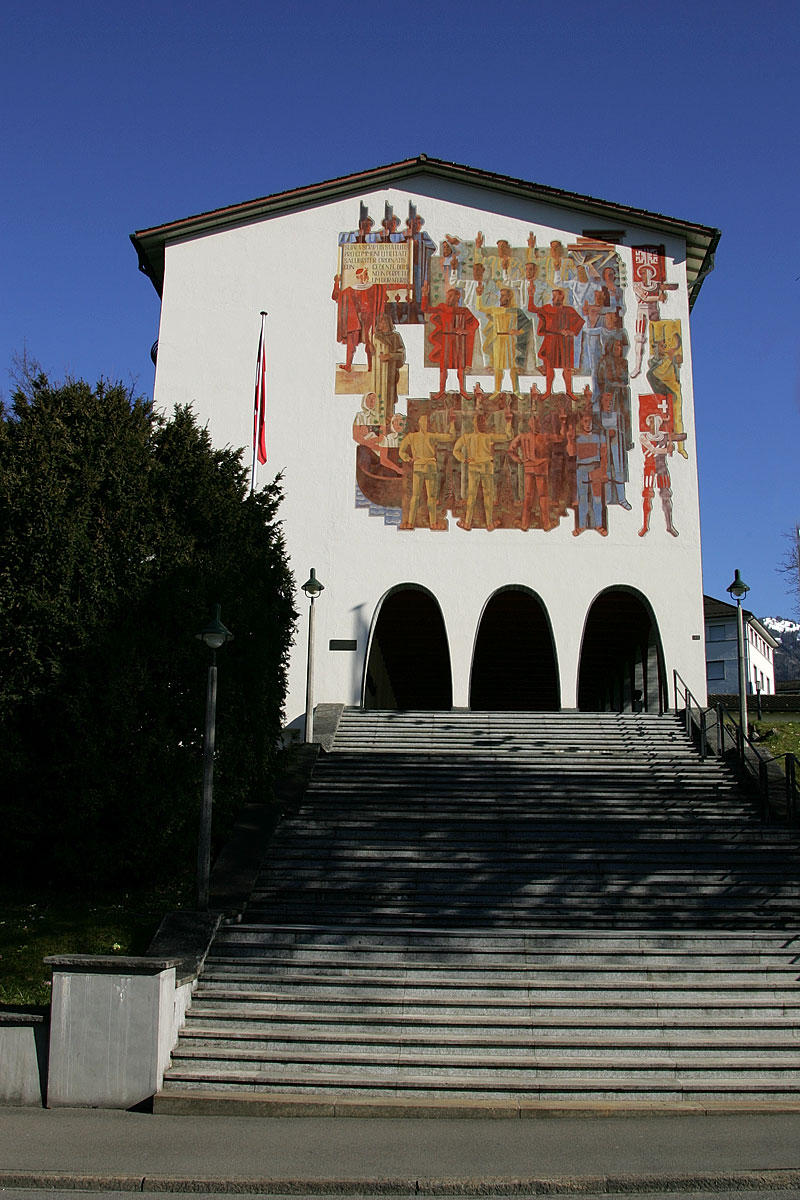
Bundesbriefmuseum (Museum of the Swiss Charters of Confederation)

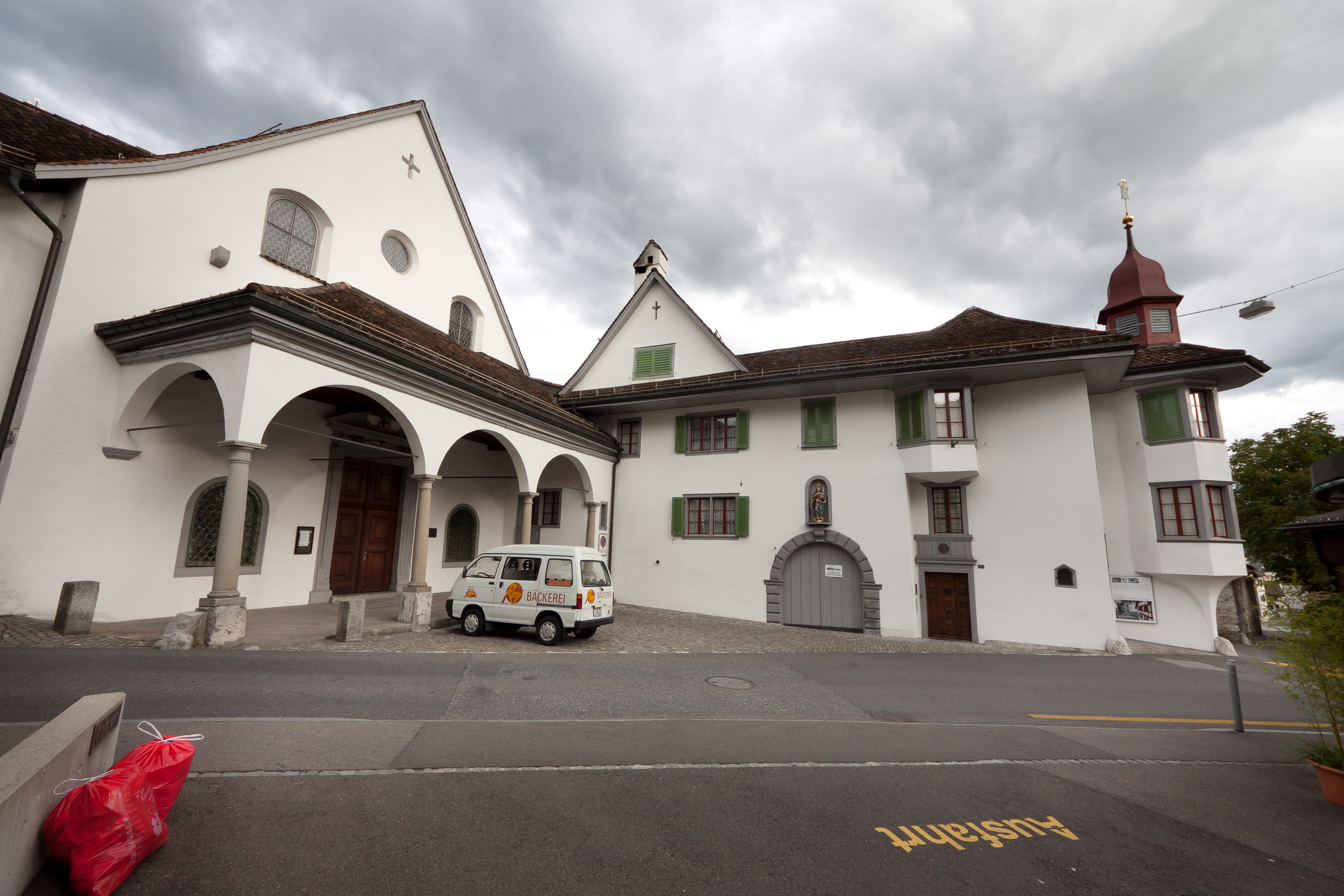
Dominican Nuns Convent of St. Peter am Bach

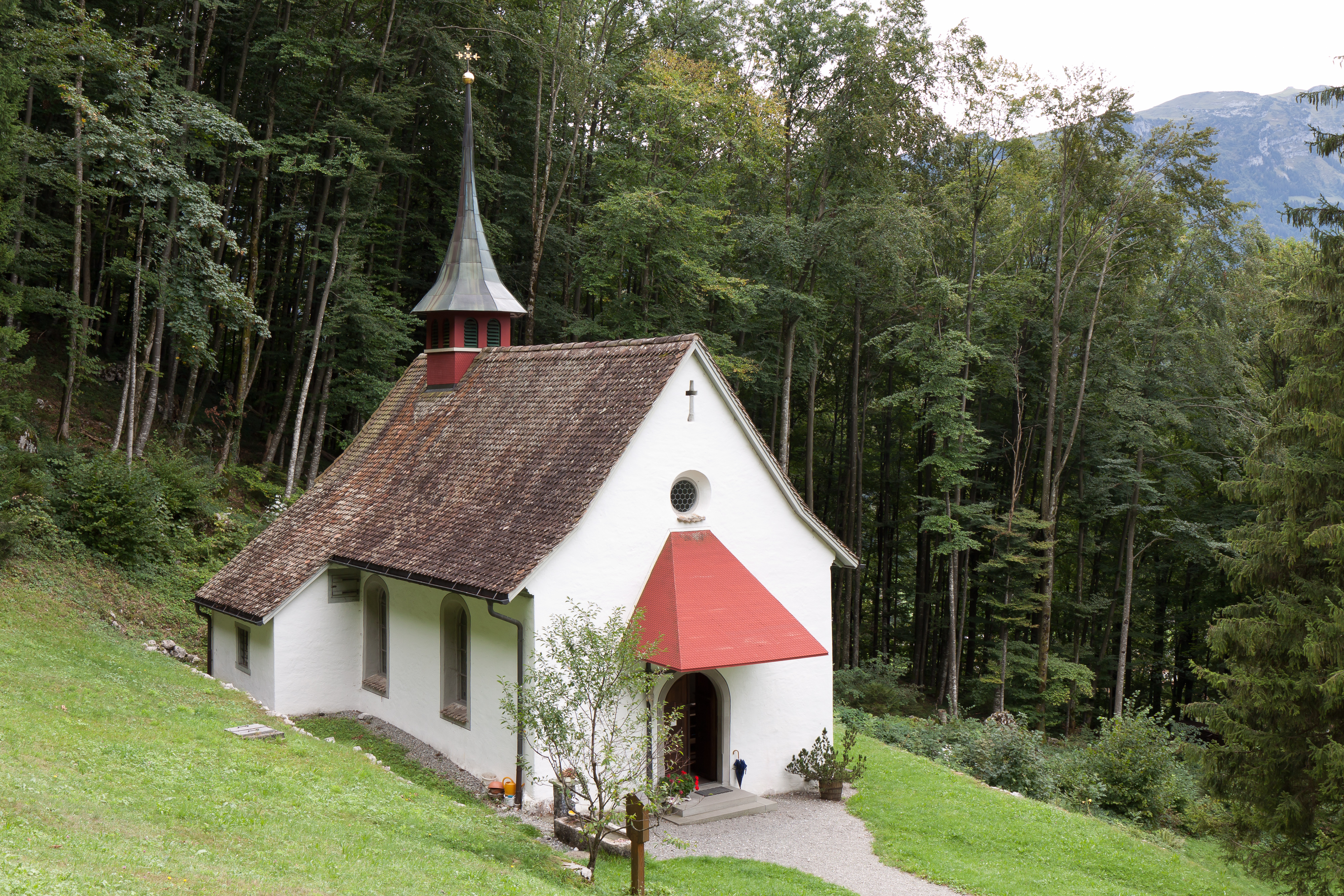
Hermitage with Chapel of the 14 Emergency Helpers and a Brothers' House

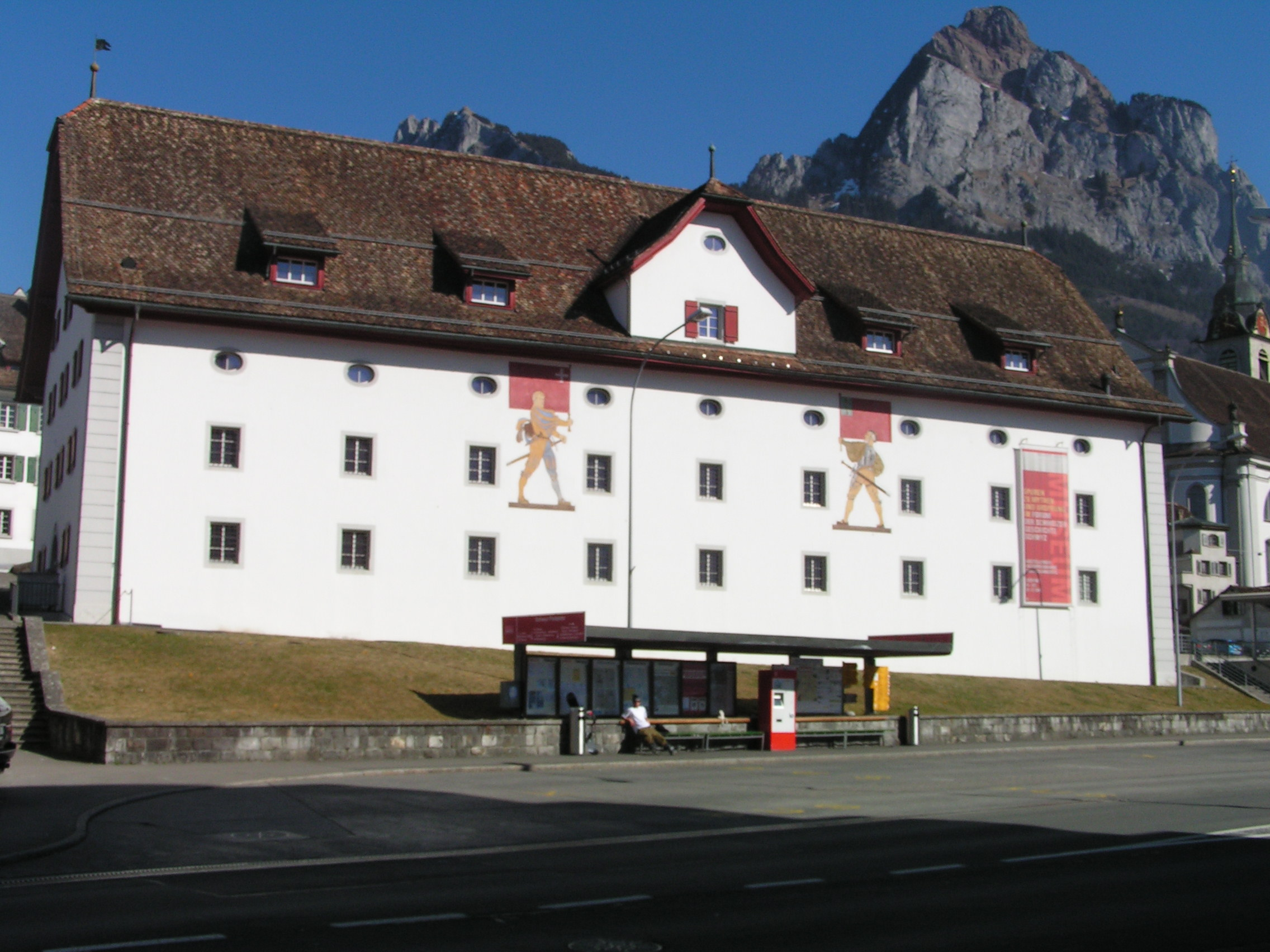
Forum der Schweizer Geschichte (Forum of Swiss History)

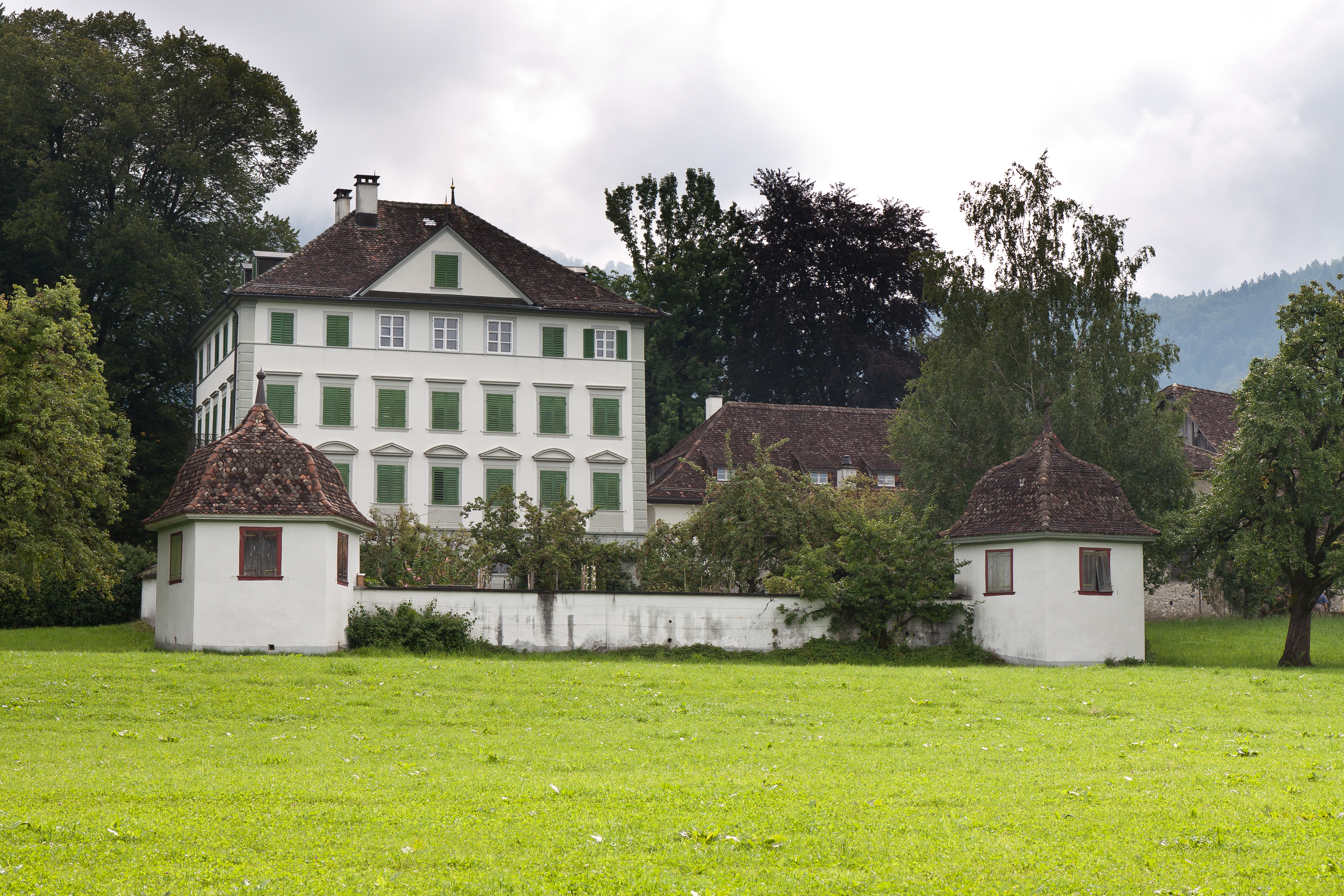
Ab Yberg im Grund House with St. Sebastian Chapel

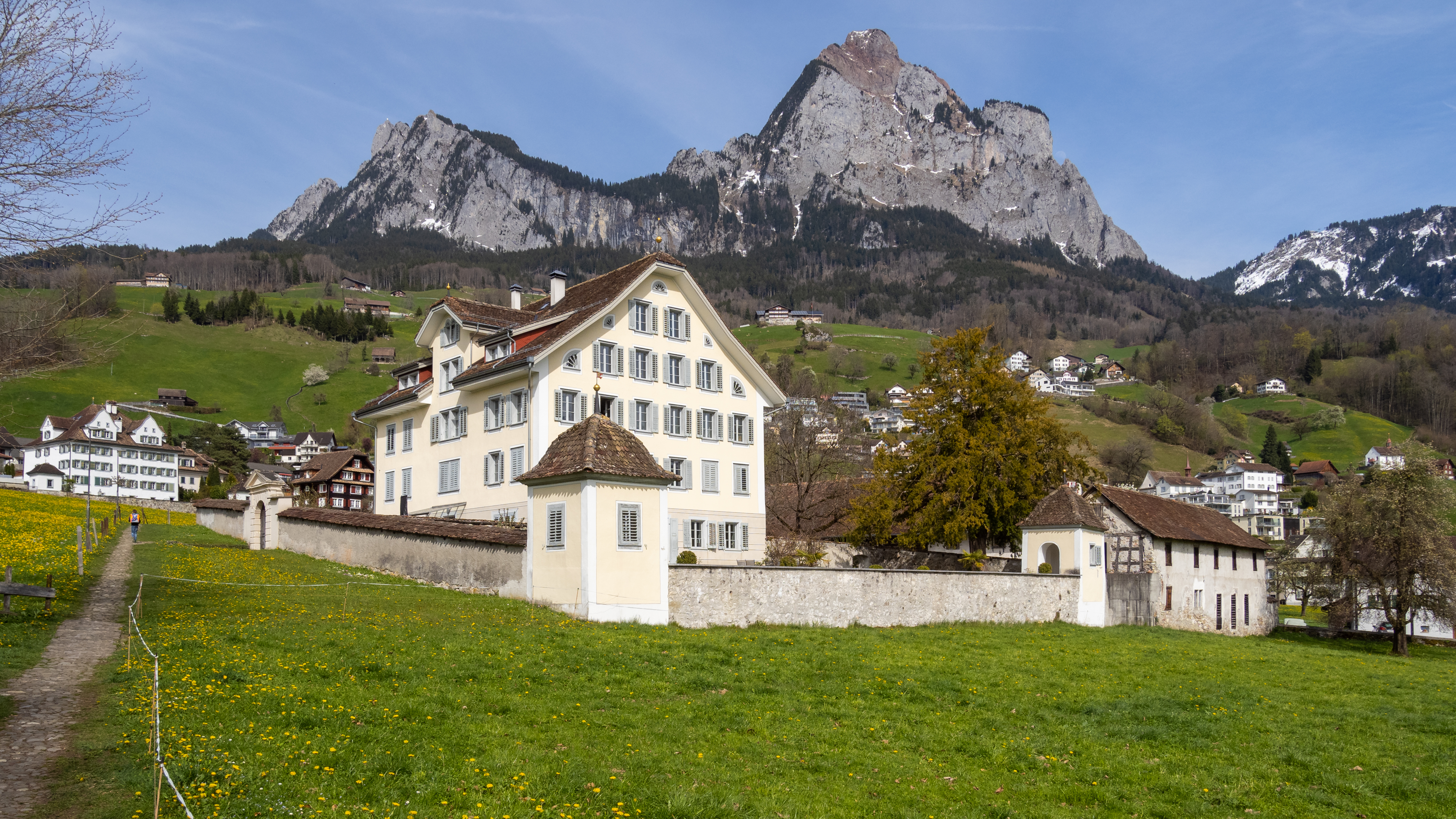
Manor house "Mittleres Feldli" and Mythen

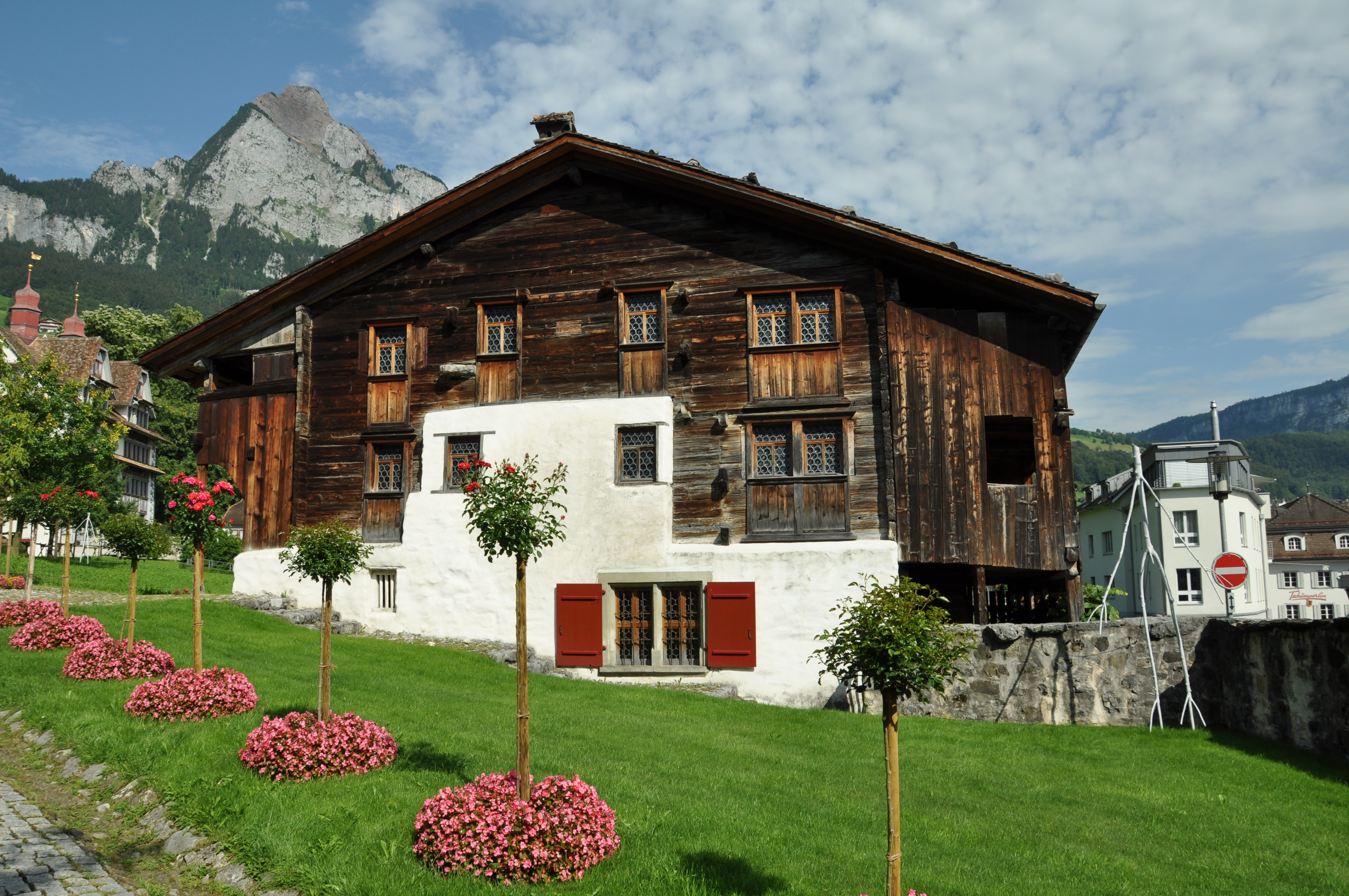
Bethlehem House at Reichsstrasse 9

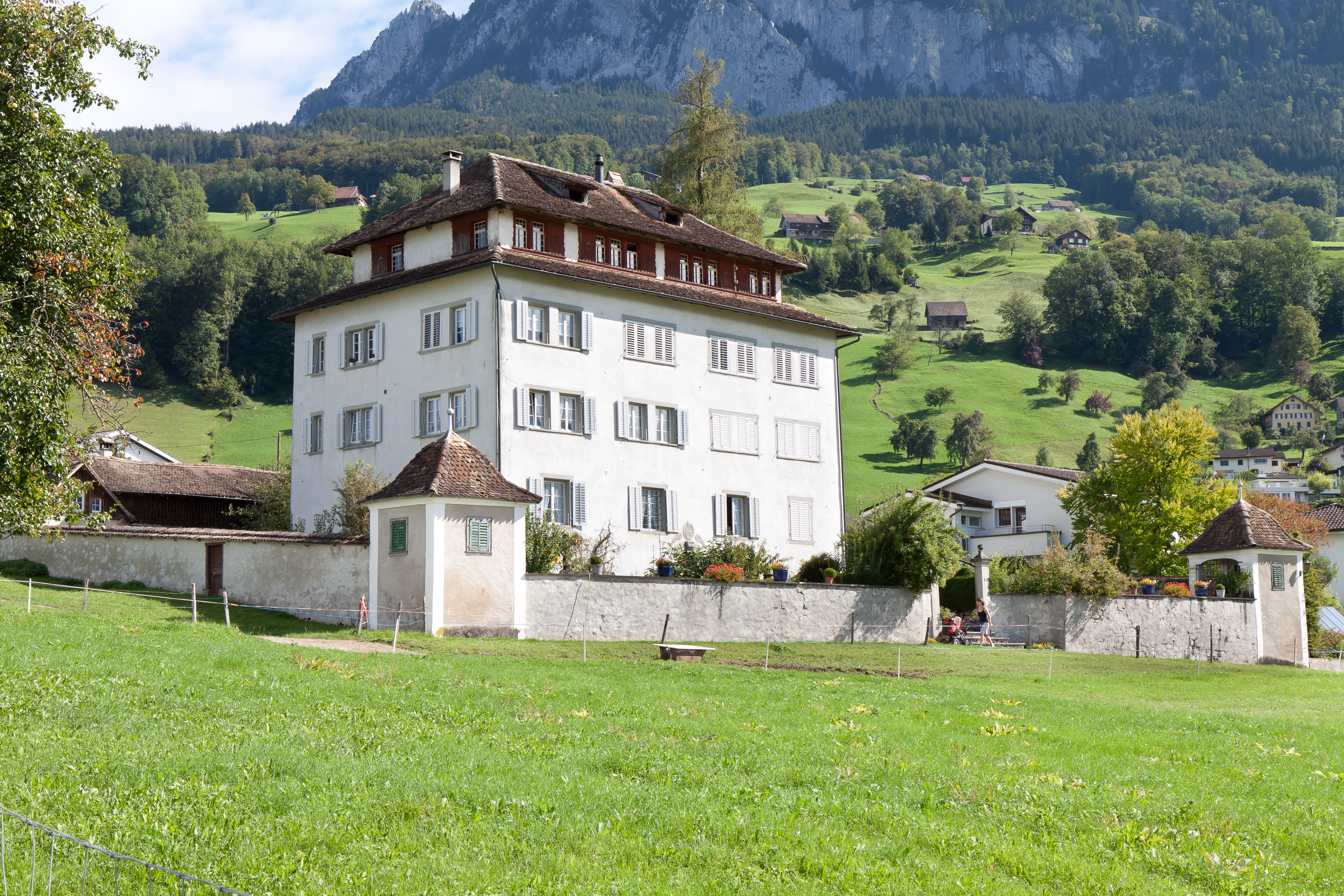
Ceberg im Feldli House at Theodosiusweg 20

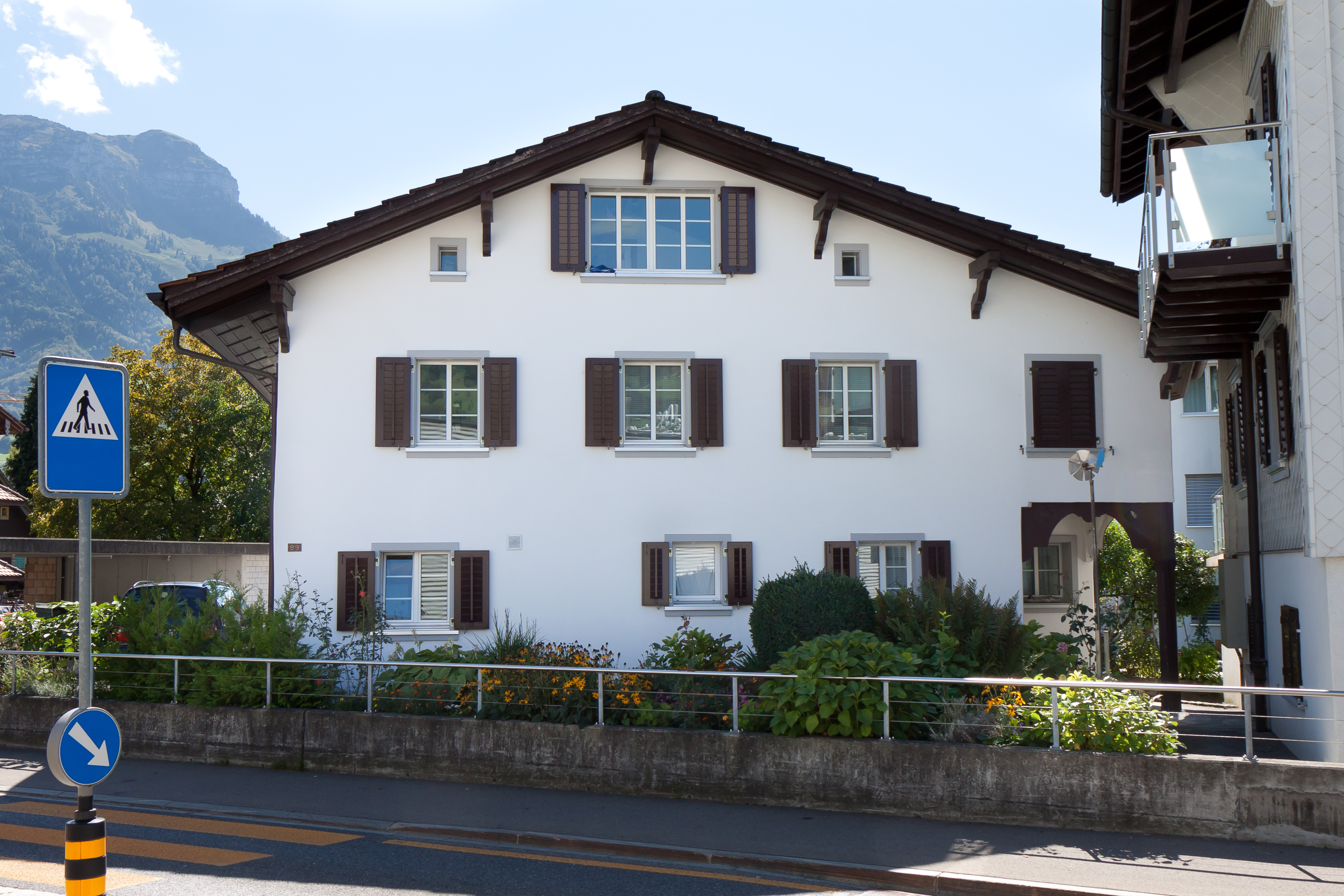
House at Gotthardstrasse 99, Ibach

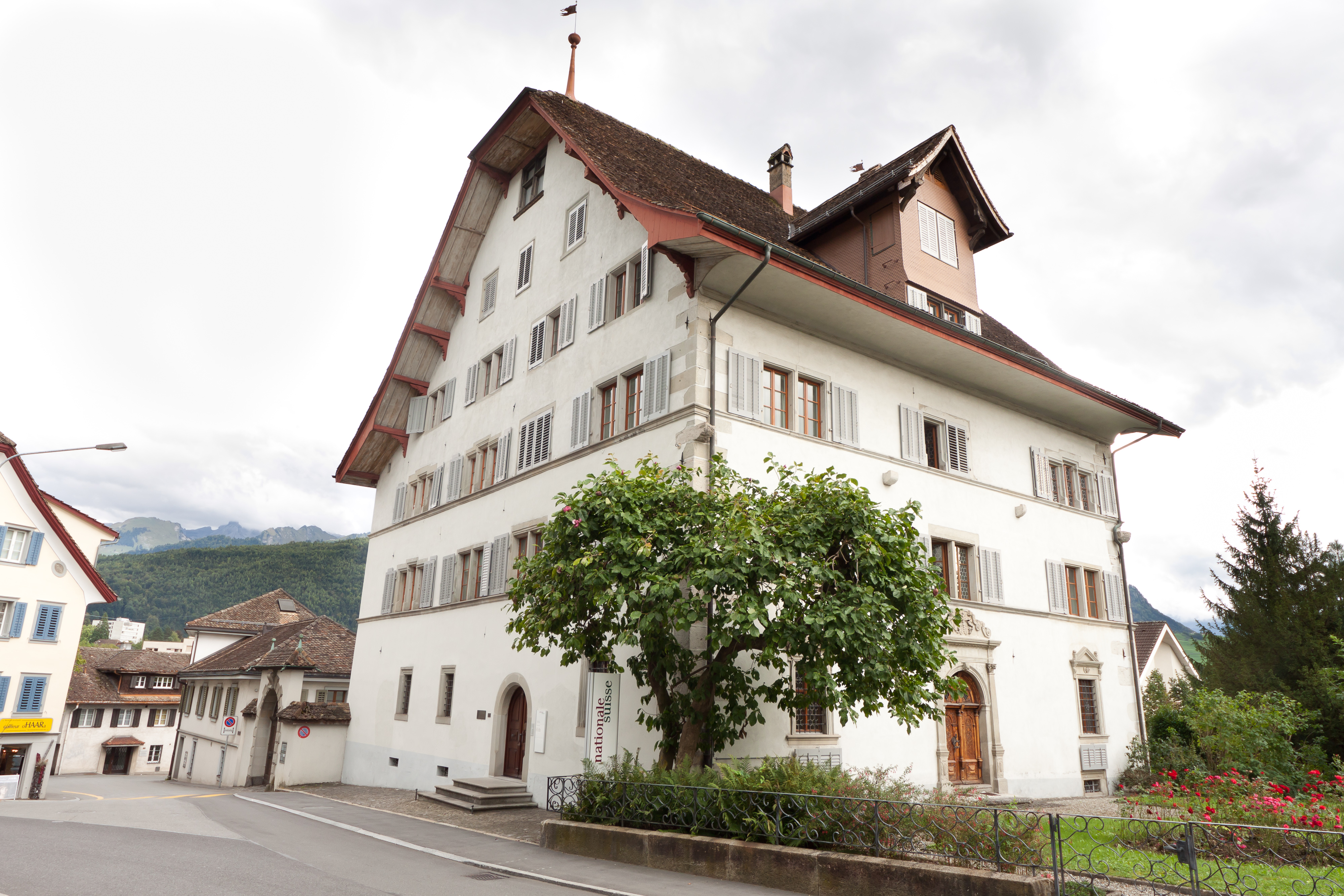
Grosshus House at Strehlgasse 12

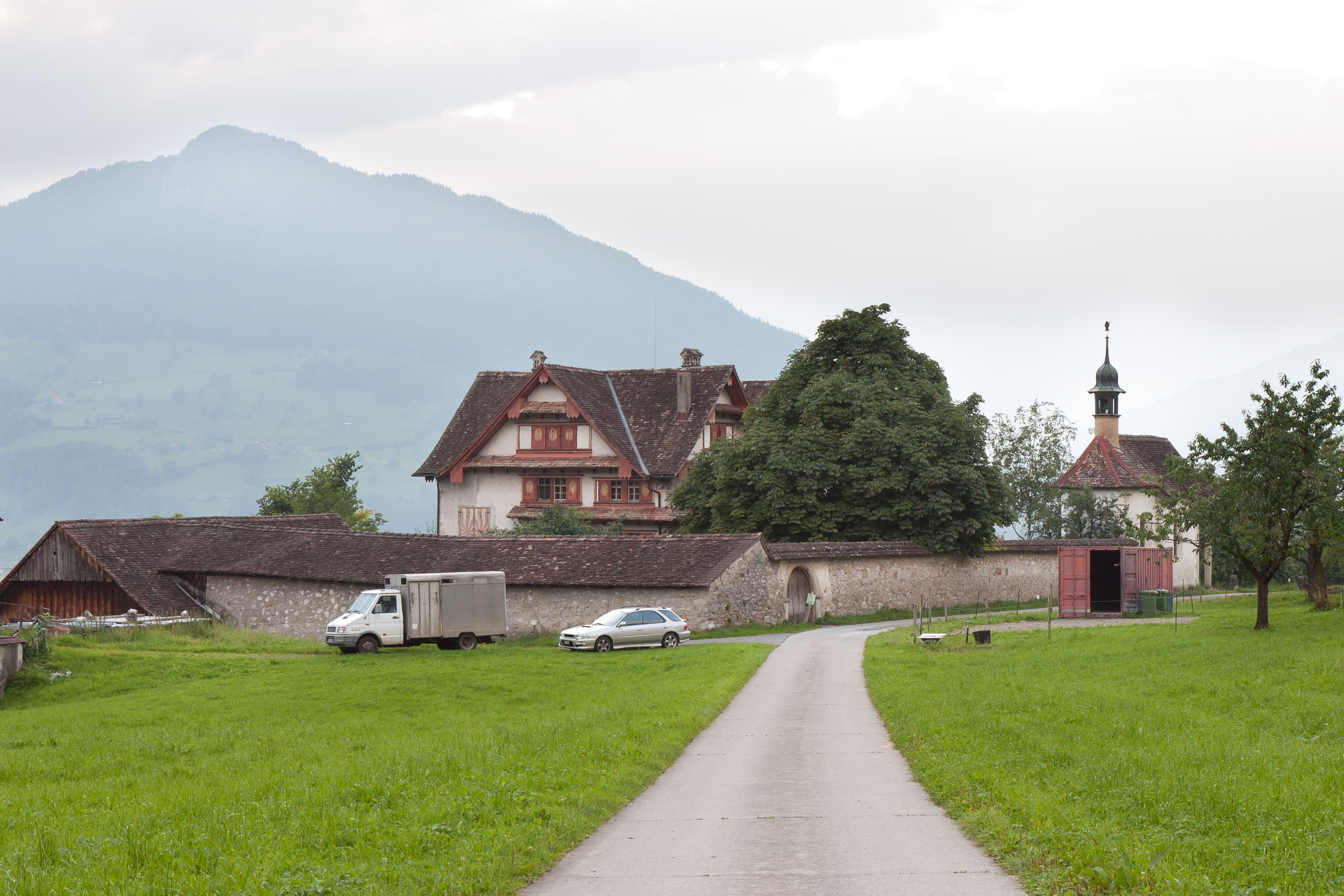
Immenfeld House

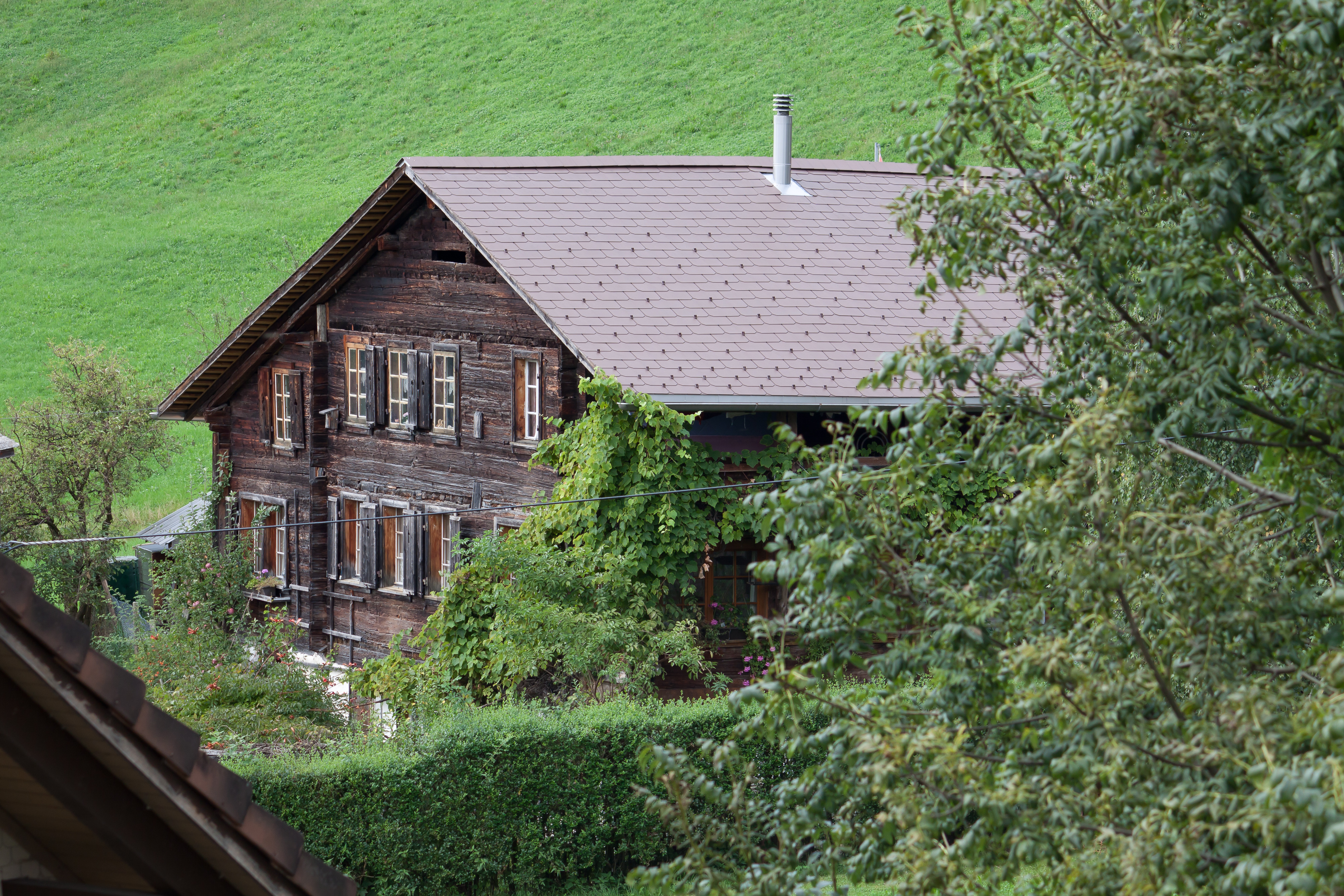
House at Langfeldweg 14, Kaltbach

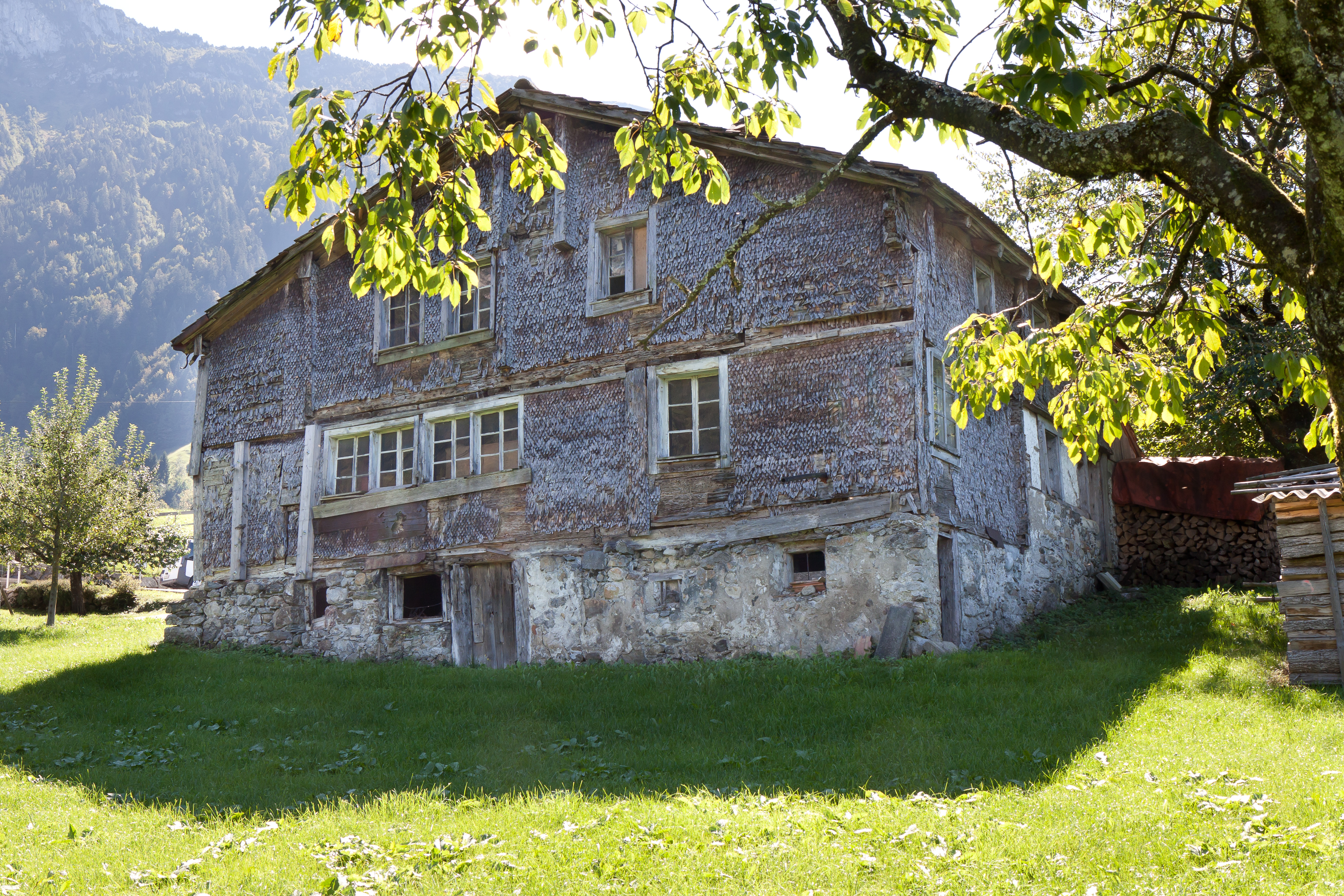
House at Oberschönenbuch 79, Ibach

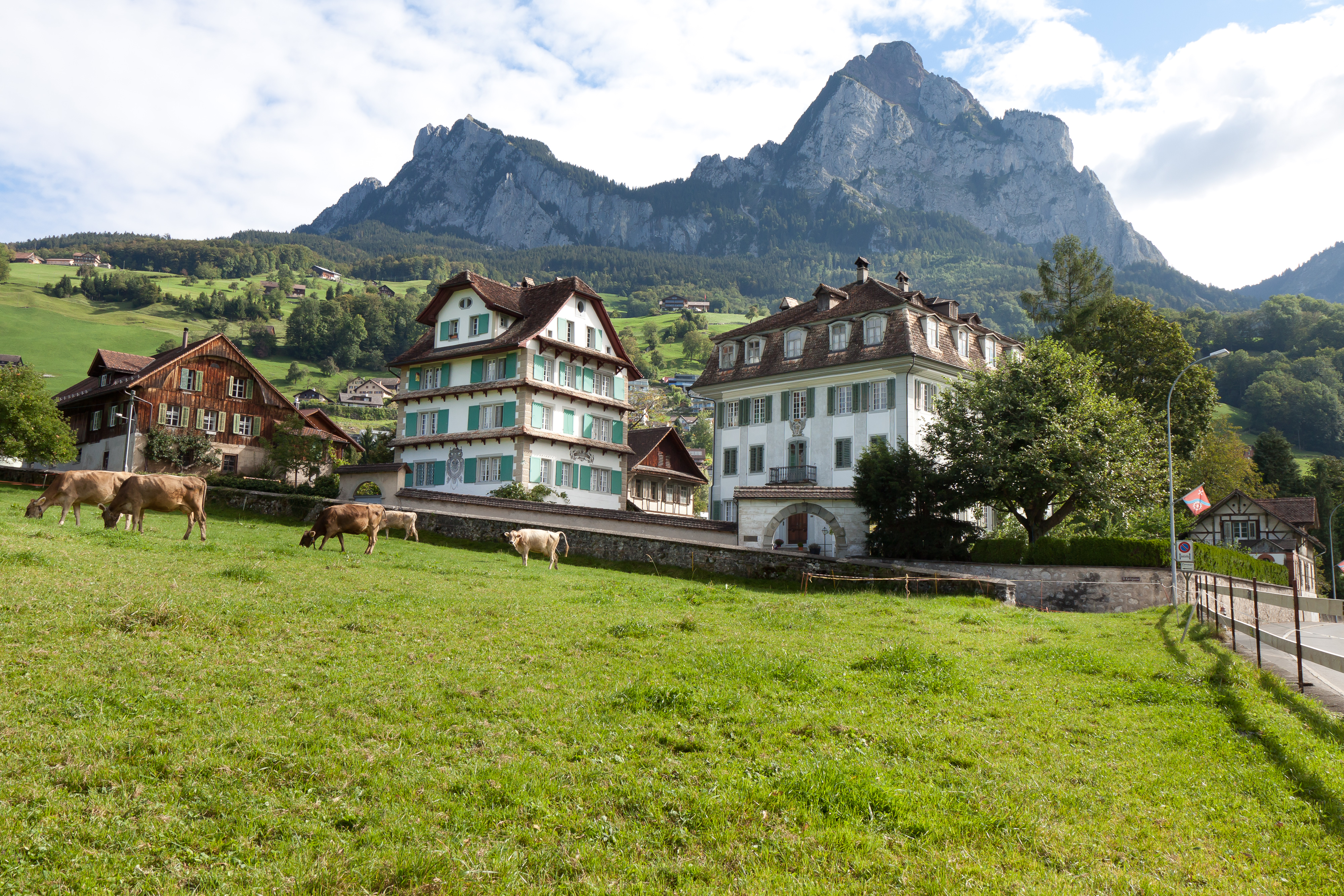
Hettlingerhäuser

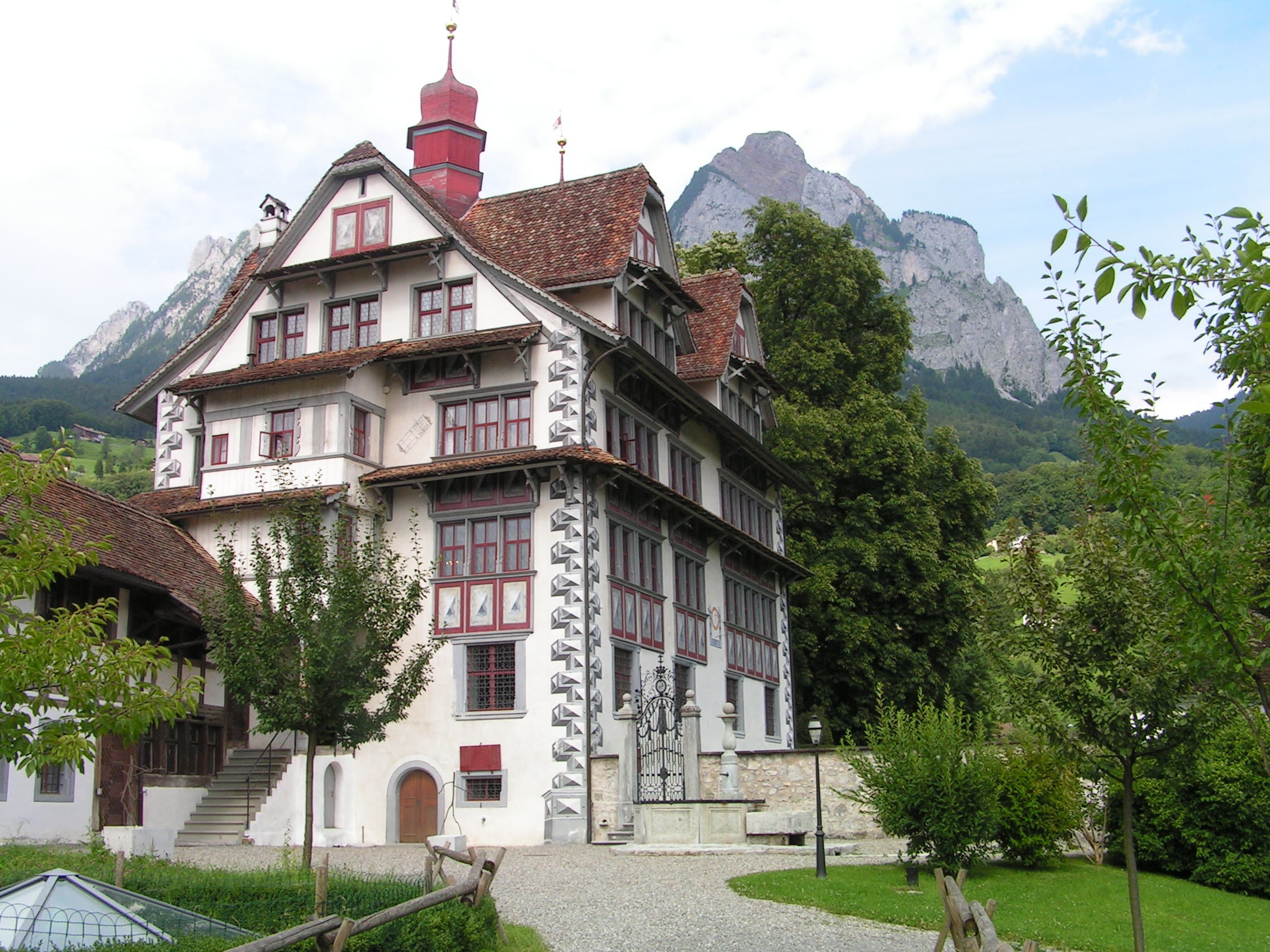
Hofstatt Ital Reding

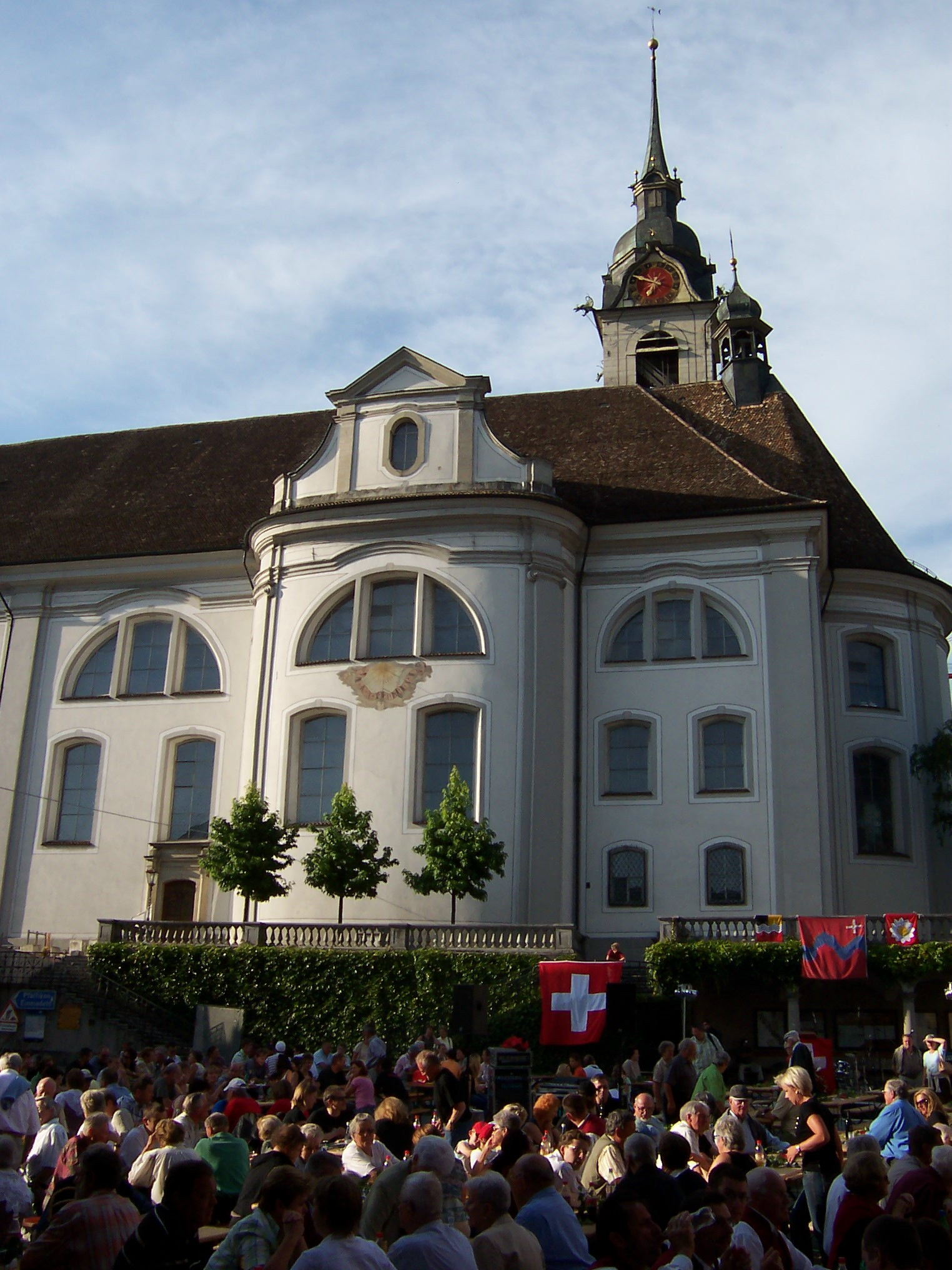
Catholic Parish Church of St. Martin ith Kerchel and Heiligkreuz Chapel

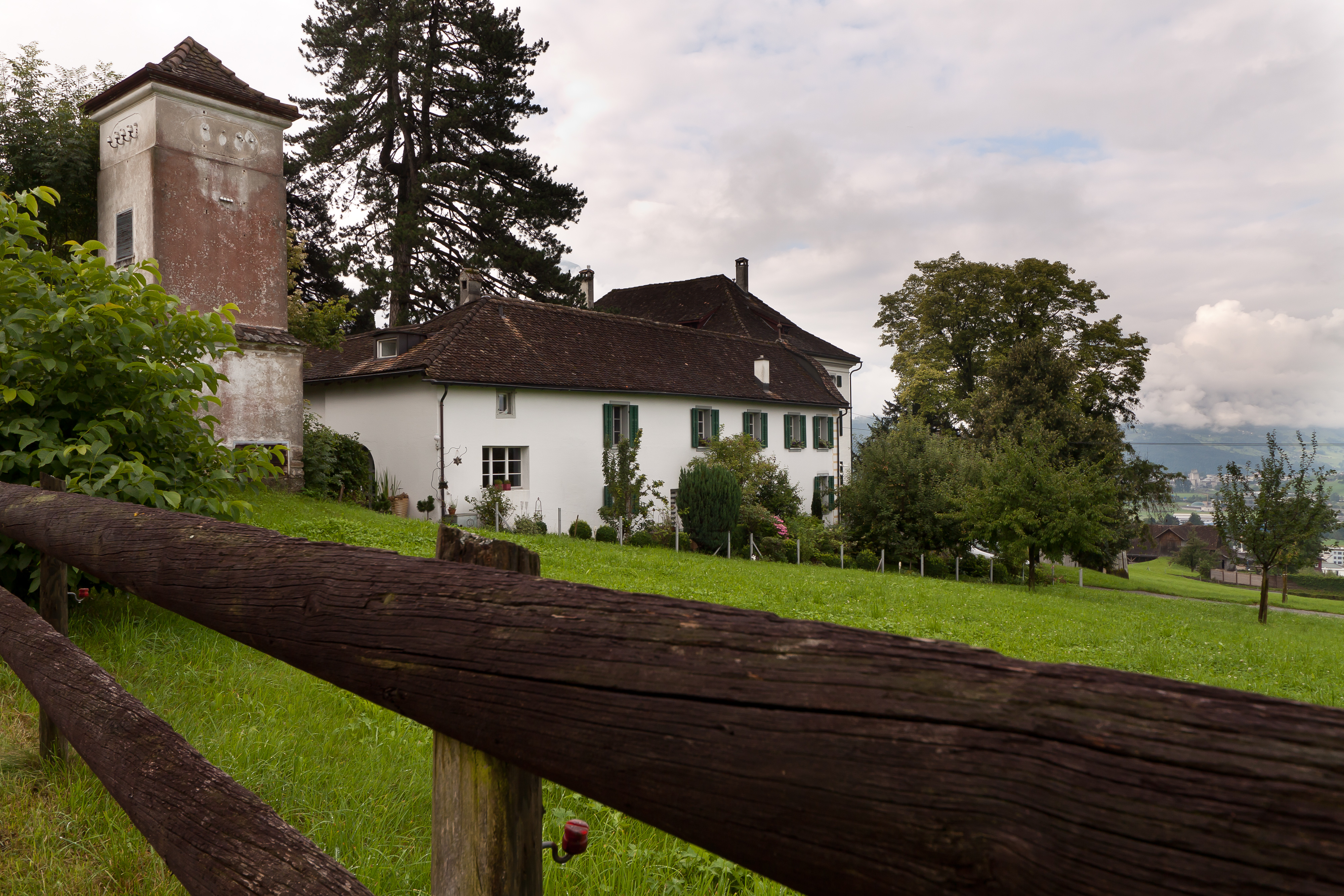
Maihof

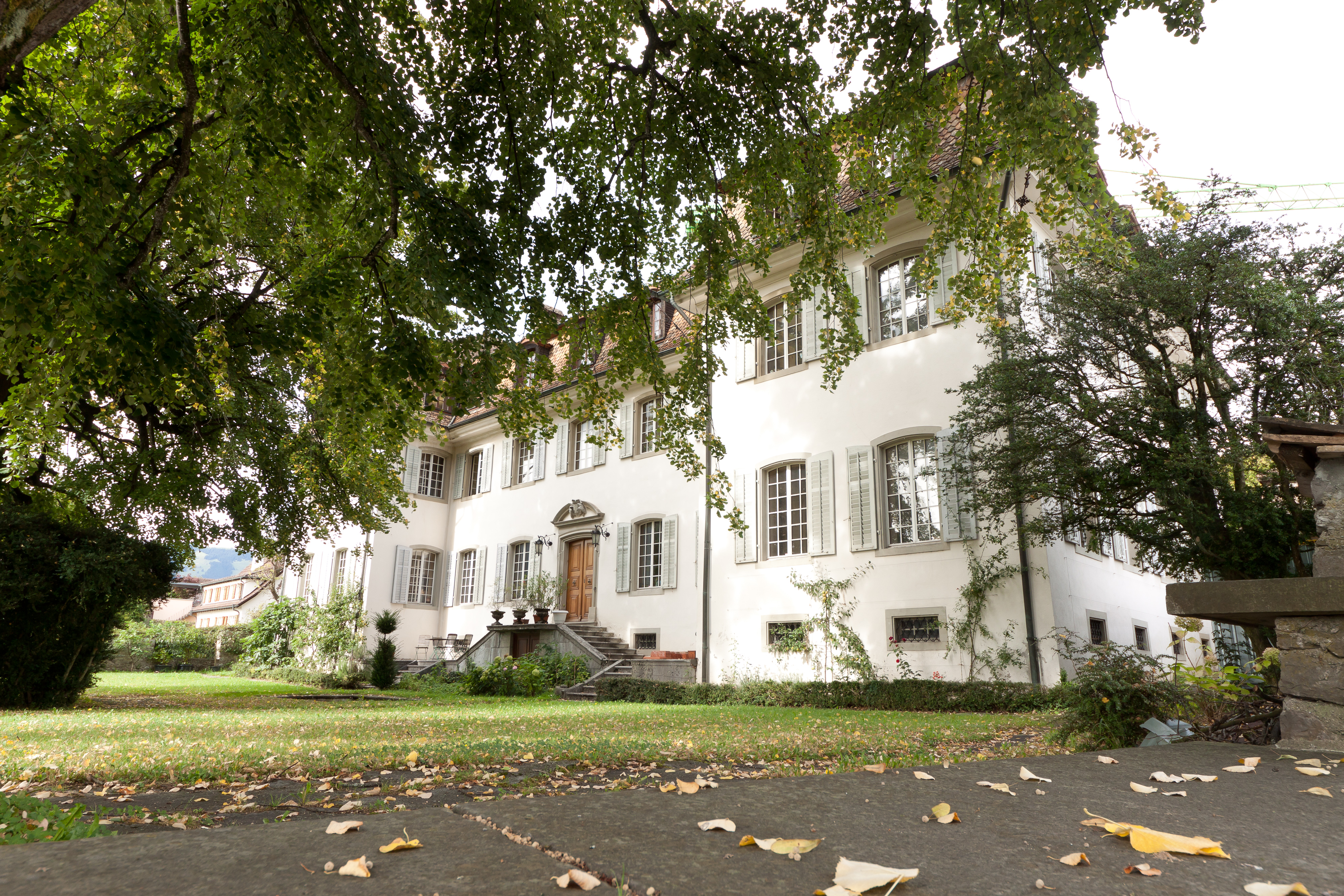
Palais Büeler (formerly Palais von Weber)

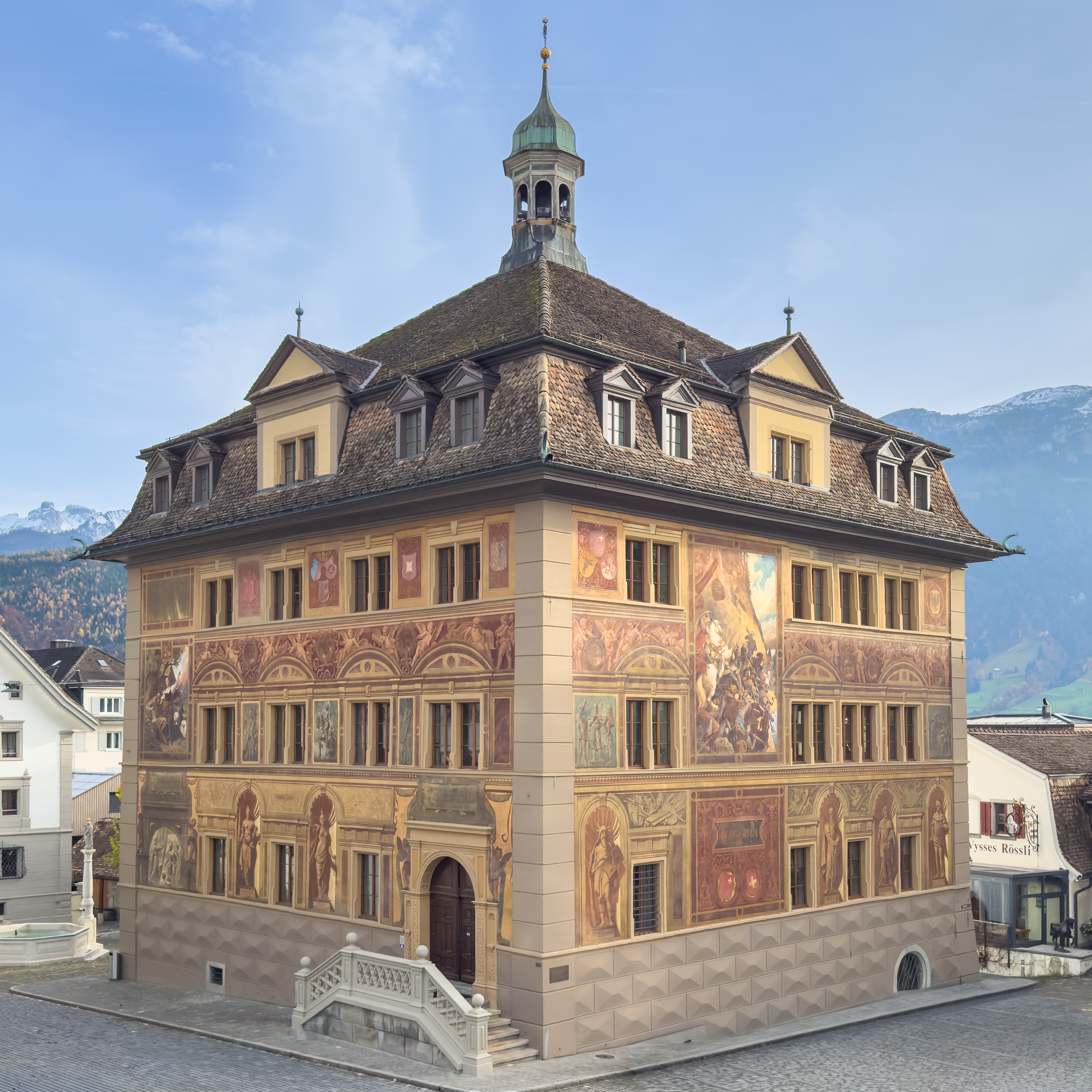
Rathaus (Town council house)

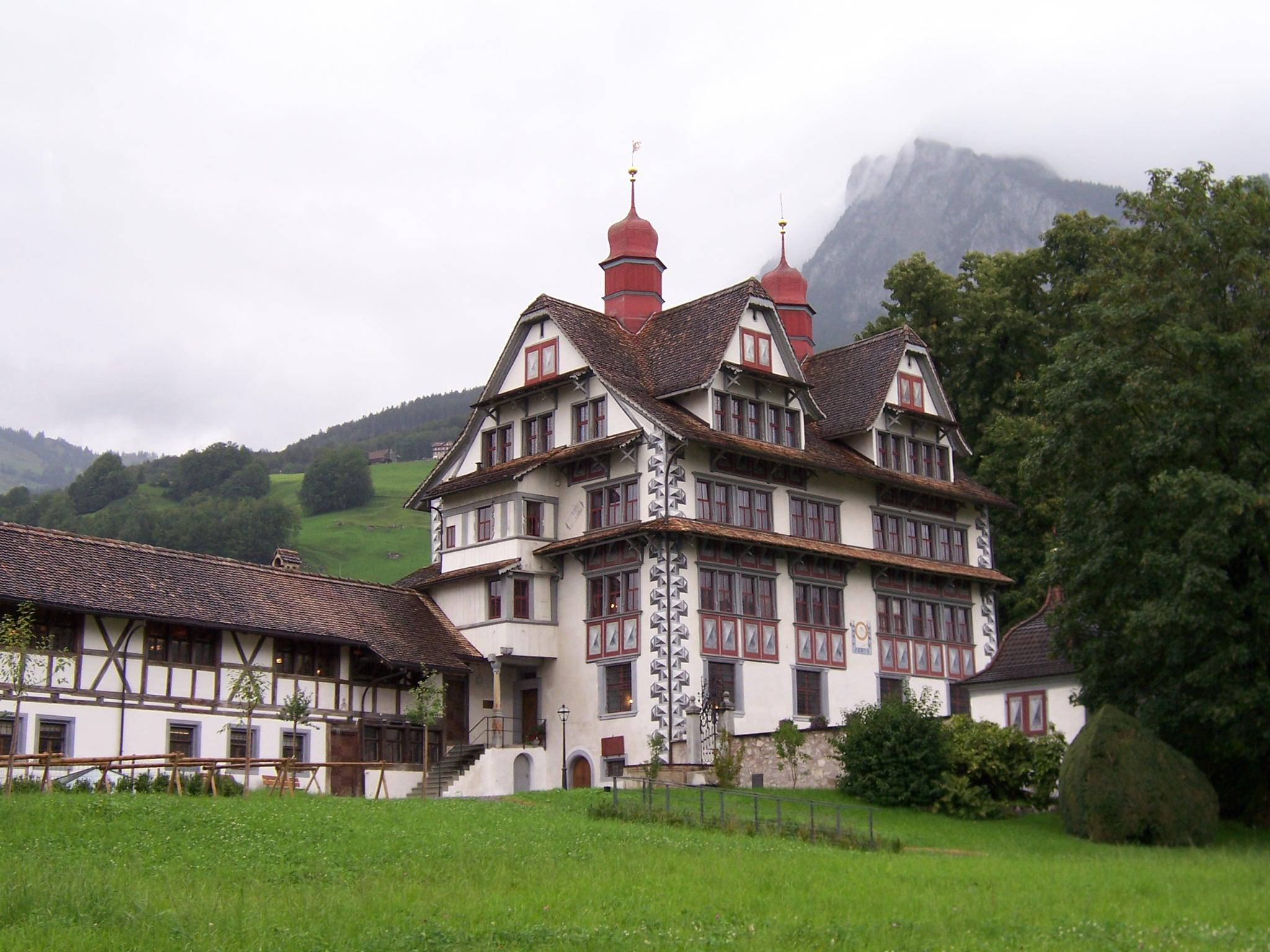
Reding House

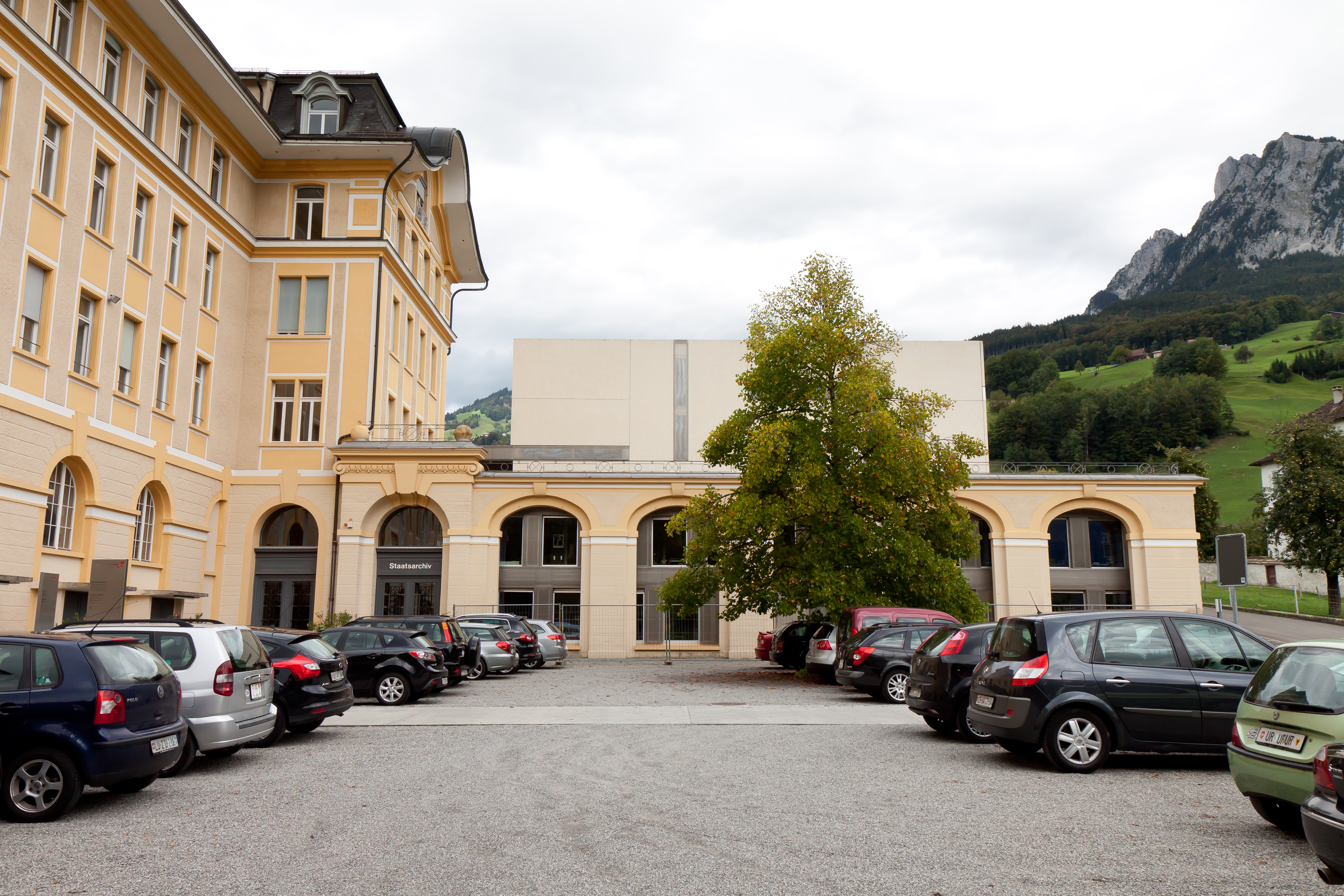
State Archives of Schwyz

== Politics ==
In the 2007 federal election the most popular party was the SVP which received 39.91% of the vote. The next three most popular parties were the CVP (26.12%), the SPS (17.05%) and the FDP (12.72%). In the federal election, a total of 5,554 votes were cast, and the voter turnout was 57.8%.

== Economy ==
As of 2010, Schwyz had an unemployment rate of 1.8%. As of 2008, there were 484 people employed in the primary economic sector and about 174 businesses involved in this sector. 2,756 people were employed in the secondary sector and there were 179 businesses in this sector. 7,099 people were employed in the tertiary sector, with 696 businesses in this sector.

In 2008 the total number of full-time equivalent jobs was 8,570. The number of jobs in the primary sector was 303, of which 273 were in agriculture and 30 were in forestry or lumber production. The number of jobs in the secondary sector was 2,647 of which 1,589 or (60.0%) were in manufacturing, 8 or (0.3%) were in mining and 928 (35.1%) were in construction. The number of jobs in the tertiary sector was 5,620. In the tertiary sector; 1,357 or 24.1% were in wholesale or retail sales or the repair of motor vehicles, 306 or 5.4% were in the movement and storage of goods, 272 or 4.8% were in a hotel or restaurant, 136 or 2.4% were in the information industry, 733 or 13.0% were the insurance or financial industry, 427 or 7.6% were technical professionals or scientists, 260 or 4.6% were in education and 1,053 or 18.7% were in health care.

In 2000, there were 4,484 workers who commuted into the municipality and 2,168 workers who commuted away. The municipality is a net importer of workers, with about 2.1 workers entering the municipality for every one leaving. Of the working population, 13.6% used public transportation to get to work, and 45.3% used a private car.

== Religion ==
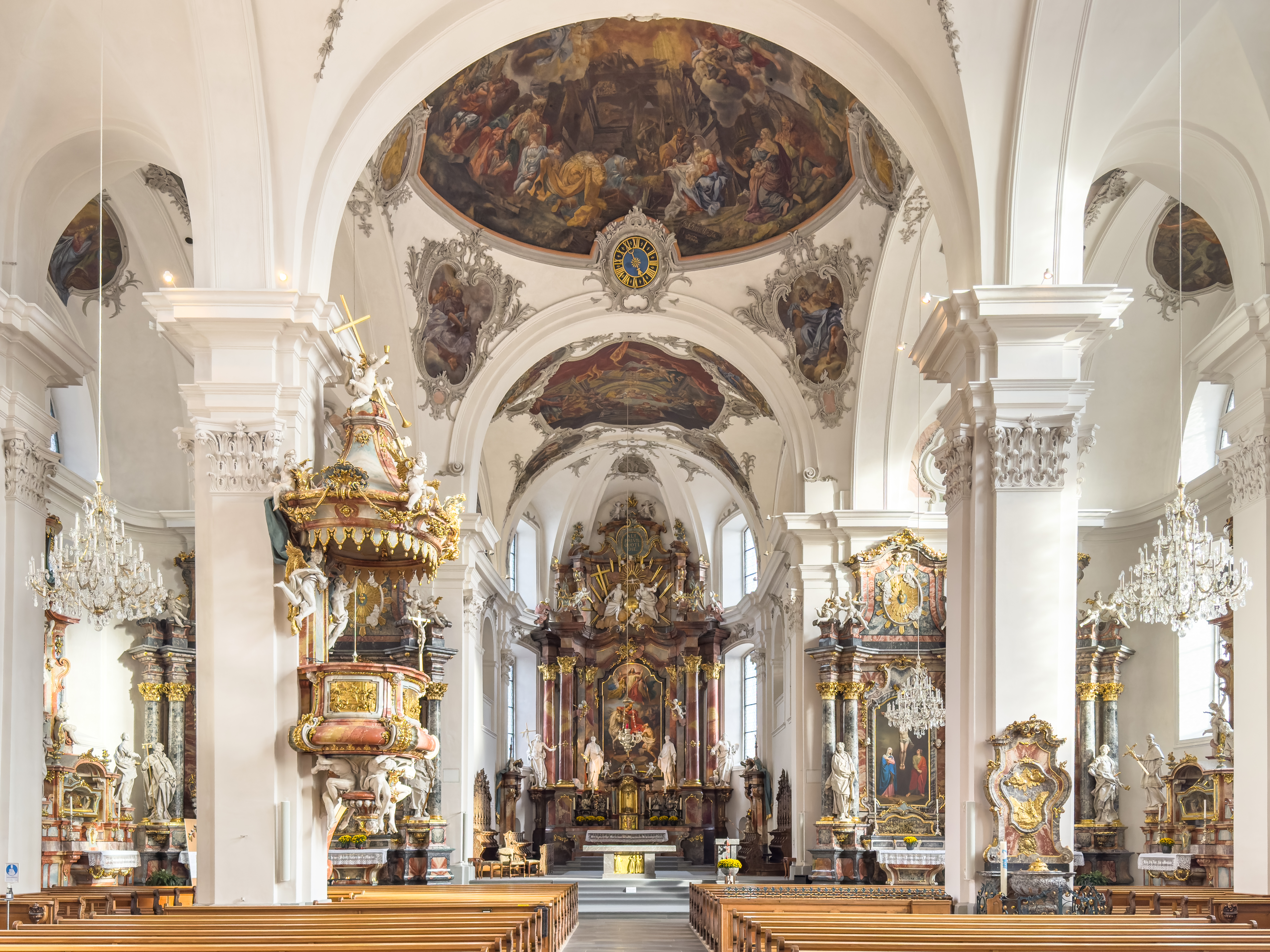
Roman Catholic Church of St. Martin

From the 2000 census, 11,269 or 81.6% were Roman Catholic, while 675 or 4.9% belonged to the Swiss Reformed Church. Of the rest of the population, there were 423 members of an Orthodox church (or about 3.06% of the population), there were 7 individuals (or about 0.05% of the population) who belonged to the Christian Catholic Church, and there were 155 individuals (or about 1.12% of the population) who belonged to another Christian church. There were 5 individuals (or about 0.04% of the population) who were Jewish, and 502 (or about 3.64% of the population) who were Islamic. There were 42 individuals who were Buddhist, 31 individuals who were Hindu and 7 individuals who belonged to another church. 377 (or about 2.73% of the population) belonged to no church, are agnostic or atheist, and 385 individuals (or about 2.79% of the population) did not answer the question.

== Education ==
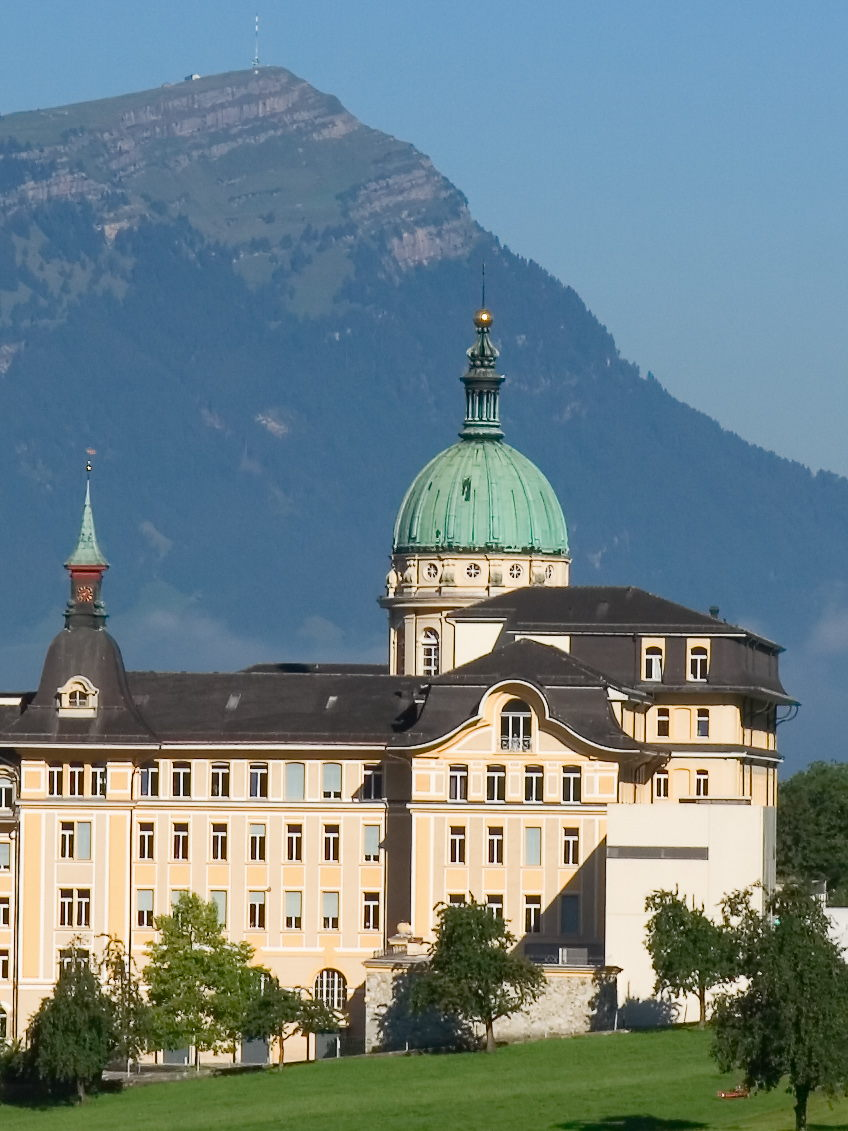
Kantonsschule Kollegium Schwyz, an upper Secondary school in Schwyz

In Schwyz about 4,873 or (35.3%) of the population have completed non-mandatory upper secondary education, and 1,473 or (10.7%) have completed additional higher education (either university or a Fachhochschule). Of the 1,473 who completed tertiary schooling, 71.1% were Swiss men, 19.4% were Swiss women, 5.3% were non-Swiss men and 4.1% were non-Swiss women. As of 2000, there were 419 students in Schwyz who came from another municipality, while 186 residents attended schools outside the municipality.

Schwyz is home to the Kantonsbibliothek Schwyz library. The library has (as of 2008) 108,142 books or other media, and loaned out 136,064 items in the same year. It was open a total of 276 days with average of 29 hours per week during that year.

A major school in Schwyz is the Kantonsschule Kollegium Schwyz (KKS), an upper Secondary school that is a Gymnasium and a vocational or technical college. The KKS has operated for over 150 years, though it builds on several older schools. The first Latin school in Schwyz opened in 1627 in the former Capuchin monastery of St. Josef im Loo. This school remained open until the 1798 French invasion. On 25 July 1841, the Jesuits laid the cornerstone of what would become the Jesuit College on the site of the modern Kollegium. The school opened in 1844 but only remained under Jesuit control for three years. In 1847, Federal troops marched into Schwyz to suppress the Catholic Sonderbund and forced the Jesuits to flee. It was reopened in 1855 under the Capuchin Father Theodosius Florentini and in the following year began teaching students. The school continued to teach students using both religious and secular teachers until the 1970s. In 1972, the lower Secondary students moved to Pfäffikon and the school became an upper Secondary Kantonsschule.

== Weather ==
Schwyz has an average of 149.2 days of rain per year and on average receives 1,629 mm (64.1 in) of precipitation. The wettest month is August during which time Schwyz receives an average of 199 mm (7.8 in) of precipitation. During this month there is precipitation for an average of 13.9 days. The month with the most days of precipitation is June, with an average of 14.8, but with only 182 mm (7.2 in) of precipitation. The driest month of the year is February with an average of 99 mm (3.9 in) of precipitation over 13.9 days.

== Transport ==
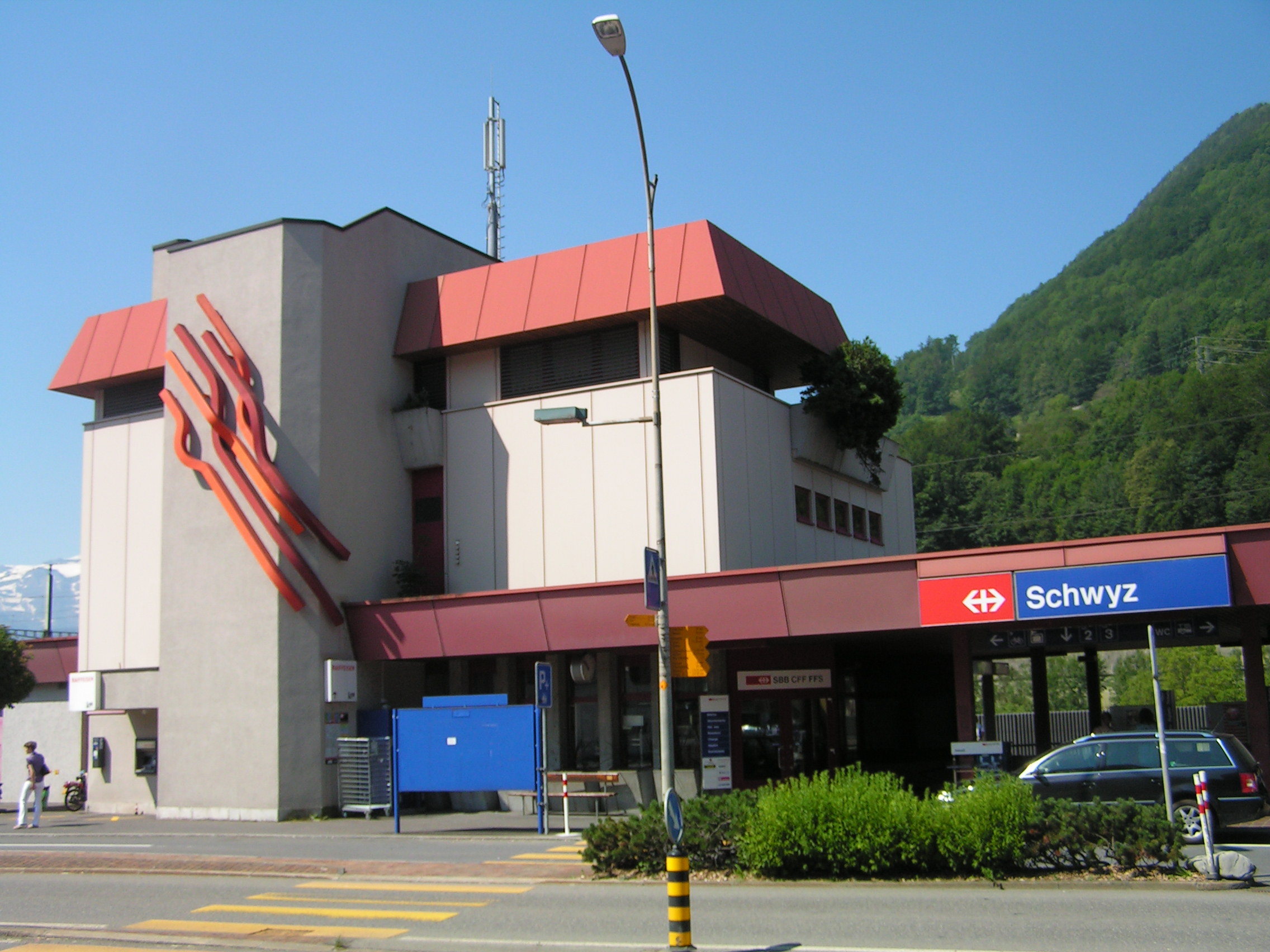
Schwyz railway station

The A4 motorway, between Zürich and the Brunnen passes through the west of the municipality, and the town is linked to it by main roads and motorway junctions. Other main roads connect the town to Lucerne (along both banks of Lake Lucerne), to the Gotthard Pass and southern Switzerland, and to Pfaffikon and Einsiedeln in the north of the canton of Schwyz. A minor road crosses the Ibergeregg Pass to Oberiberg, providing an alternative route to Einsiedeln. Other minor roads reach to near the summits of both the Haggenegg Pass and Holzegg Pass, but only hiking trails actually cross these passes and continue to Alpthal.

Schwyz railway station, on the Gotthard railway, is located about 2 km (1.2 mi) outside the town, in the parish of Seewen. The station is served by InterRegio and S-Bahn trains.

Early plans for the Schweizerische Südostbahn included a proposal for what is now the Pfäffikon SZ–Arth-Goldau railway to terminate at Brunnen railway station instead of Arth-Goldau railway station. If that proposal had come to fruition, the Schwyz town centre would have had a railway station – initially on the Kollegi football field, and later in Steisteg.

From 6 October 1900 to 14 December 1963, the Schwyzer Strassenbahnen linked the Schwyz railway station with the town centre. On 8 May 1915, the additional section between Schwyz and Brunnen See was opened – and on the same day, the Schwyz SBB–Schwyz line was shut down. The trams were eventually replaced by the Auto AG Schwyz, which today operates 12 bus lines in the cantons of Lucerne and Schwyz.

The Rotenfluebahn links Rickenbach with the summit of the Rotenfluh mountain, which is, in summer, a popular vantage point over the Lake Lucerne region, and, in winter, a ski area.

== Notable people ==
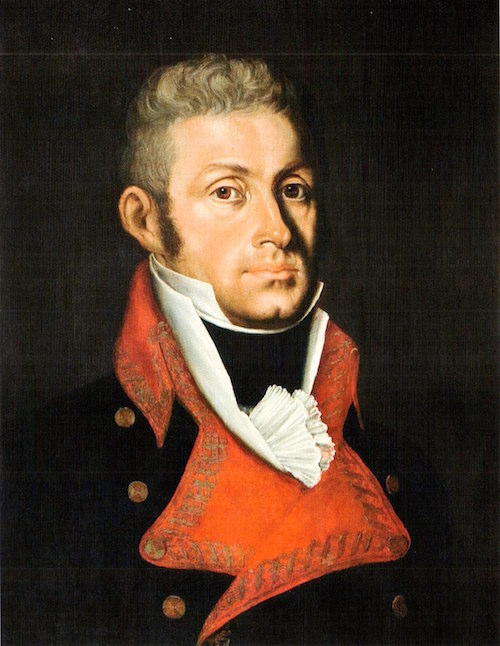
General Teodoro Reding

- Theodor von Reding (1755 in Schwyz – 1809) a Spanish general, led Swiss and Spanish troops against Napoleon
- Alois von Reding (1765 in Schwyz – 1818) a Swiss patriot, military officer and politician, brother of Theodor
- Carl Elsener Sr. (1922 – 2013 in Schwyz) a Swiss entrepreneur with the Swiss Army knife
- Xavier Koller (born 1944 in Schwyz) a Swiss film director and screenwriter
- Gertrud Leutenegger (born 1948 in Schwyz – 2025 there) a Swiss poet, novelist, playwright and theatre director
- Monika Kaelin (born 1954 in Schwyz) a model and actress

Sport

- Oscar Camenzind (born 1971 in Schwyz) a former professional road racing cyclist
- Luca Schuler (born 1998 in Schwyz) a Swiss freestyle skier, competed at the 2014 Winter Olympics
- Corinne Suter (born 1994 in Schwyz) a Swiss alpine skier, Olympic gold medallist at the 2022 Winter Olympics
