= Rotenfluebahn =

Swiss gondola lift

- Rotenfluebahn
- Interactive map of Rotenfluebahn

Overview
- Status: Operational
- Character: Recreational
- Location: Rickenbach, Schwyz
- Country: Switzerland
- Coordinates: 47°0′53″N 8°40′9.3″E
- Termini: Talstation; Bergstation
- Elevation: lowest: 613 m ü. M. highest: 1571 m ü. M.
- No. of stations: 3
- Construction cost: 23 Mio.
- Construction begin: 11:00, 17 October 2013 (+01:00)
- Open: 9 December 2014; 11 years ago
- Website: www.mythenregion.ch/sommer/region/rotenflue/

Operation
- Owner: Rotenfluebahn Mythenregion AG
- Operator: Rotenfluebahn Mythenregion AG
- No. of carriers: 23
- Carrier capacity: 800 passengers per hour
- Ridership: 82'971 (FY2023–24)
- Operating times: 9.00 - 16.30 (October - Begin ski operation); 8.30 - 16.15 (Begin ski operation - March); 8.30 - 17.00 (May - June); 8.30 - 17.30 (June - October)
- Trip duration: 11 min.
- Fare: CHF 28.-

Technical features
- Aerial lift type: Mono-cable gondola detachable
- Manufactured by: Doppelmayr/Garaventa Group
- Line length: 2,830 m (9,280 ft)
- No. of support towers: 16
- No. of cables: 1
- Operating speed: 5 m/s (16 ft/s)

The Rotenfluebahn is a gondola lift in the canton of Schwyz. It links Rickenbach with the Rotenfluh. It is owned and operated by the Rotenfluebahn Mythenregion AG (formerly Seilbahn Rickenbach-Rotenfluh AG until September 2013). The current lift was built in 2014 and has been operating since December 2014.

In December 2024, the lift was featured in the crime film series Der Zürich-Krimi.

== History ==
The first aerial tramway was built in 1957 and connected Huserenberg with Rothenfluh. An additional one from Rickenbach to Huserenberg was then built in 1964. It operated until 2 November 2004, when it was closed due to security concerns. It was then demolished in 2009.

In 2005, Nathalie Henseler became the CEO of Seilbahn Rickenbach-Rotenfluh AG, and at the general assembly, it was decided to begin planning a new lift. The planning took several years, partly due to objections to the planning application that went all the way to the Federal Supreme Court. Notable investors of the new lift include: The municipality, district and canton of Schwyz, the Schwyzer Kantonalbank, the Swiss government. After 8 years of planning the new lift was approved in July 2013 by the Federal Office of Transport. Construction began in October 2013 with the groundbreaking on 17 October. The lift opened after a year of construction on 9 December 2014.
