= Nathalie Henseler =

Swiss entrepreneur, author and politician

- Born: 9 December 1975 (age 50); Altdorf, Switzerland
- Education: University of Zurich
- Occupations: CEo and chairman of the board of the rotenfluebahn mythenregion ag
- Children: 3 children
- Website: www.sprache-und-politik.ch

Nathalie Henseler (born 9 December 1975, Altdorf, Switzerland) is a Swiss entrepreneur, author and politician (FDP).

== Life and career ==
Nathalie Henseler grew up in Goldau. After finishing high school at Theresianum Ingenbohl, she studied German language and literature, geography and history at the University of Zurich.

She then worked for several years as a freelance journalist and editor at the daily newspaper Blick. After which, she then became self-employed as a political and strategy consultant.

In 2006, she voluntarily took over the presidency of the unused Rotenfluebahn. 10 years later, after long political processes, the new gondola lift reopened in December 2014. Today Nathalie Henseler is CEO and chairman of the board of the Rotenfluebahn Mythenregion AG. She was voted "Head of the Year 2014" in the canton of Schwyz.

In 2022, Henseler's determination and achievement to keep the Rotenfluebahn alive were honoured as she was named as one of 50 Swiss women who have influence life in their region and beyond the Swiss borders.

Henseler is married, has three children and lives in Rickenbach, Schwyz.

== Politics ==
Nathalie Henseler was from 2005 until 2009 a member of the Constitutional Commission of the Canton of Schwyz and from 2008 until 2009 of its Executive Committee. She is co-founder of the Schwyzer Kinderparlament. She ran for Council of States, the elections in 2015, in the canton of Schwyz.

== Bibliography ==
- Henseler, Nathalie; Maeder, Herbert (1 November 2010). Gipfelgeschichten: wie die Schweizer Berge zu ihrem Namen kamen (in German). Fona Verlag AG. ISBN 978-3-03781-009-5. LCCN 2012422248. OCLC 694877863. OL 25373771M.
