= Museum of the Swiss Charters of Confederation =

History museum in Schwyz, Switzerland

Coordinates: 47.0219°N 8.6483°E

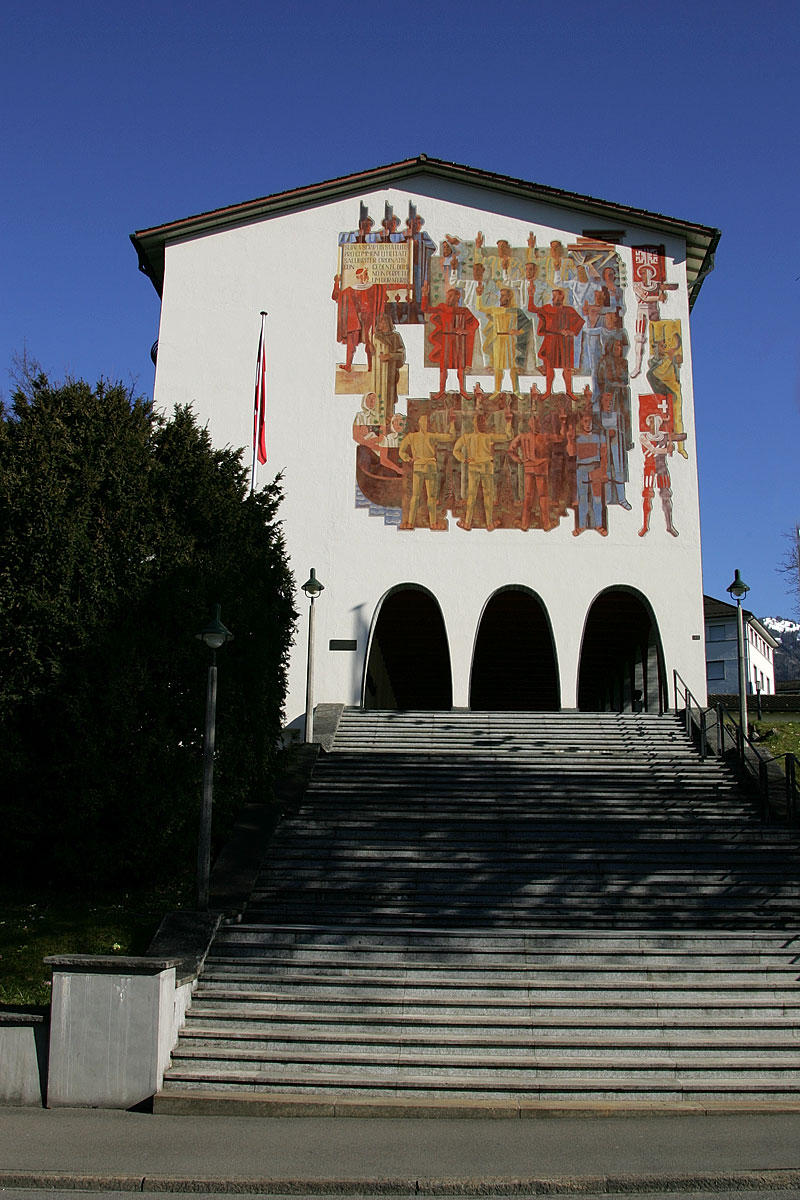
The main façade of the building with the mural "Fundamentum" by Heinrich Danioth

The Museum of the Swiss Charters of Confederation (German: Bundesbriefmuseum; up to 1992 the Federal Charter Archive) is a history museum in Schwyz. It was built in 1936 as a national shrine for the Federal Charter of 1291, which was believed to be the founding document of the Swiss Confederation. Today, the museum explains the national myth and the actual history of the Old Swiss Confederacy. It features a collection of original documents and flags.

== History ==
First ideas for a national monument date back to the 600th anniversary of the Confederation in 1891. It was only realized in the 1930s when the Canton of Schwyz planned to move its state archive to a wing of the new building. The main part of the building was the exhibition hall for the Charter of 1291 which would lay on an "Altar of the Fatherland". The archive was built and opened in 1936. Murals on the façade and on the interior depict the Rütli Oath and Nicholas of Flüe. Four years later, the monumental sculpture "Wehrbereitschaft" (Readiness to Defend) was erected in the park.

The overwhelming Spiritual national defence of this period vanished over time. The Federal Charter of 1291 is no longer seen as Switzerland's founding document. Other documents have been given equal importance. Beginning with the exhibition design of 1999, the museum began to integrate the latest historical findings. Since 2014, the myth surrounding the Federal Charter is an important part of the current permanent exhibition, while the architectural setting of the 1930s remains present.

== See also ==
- List of museums in Switzerland
