= Rickenbach, Schwyz =

Rickenbach
- Village
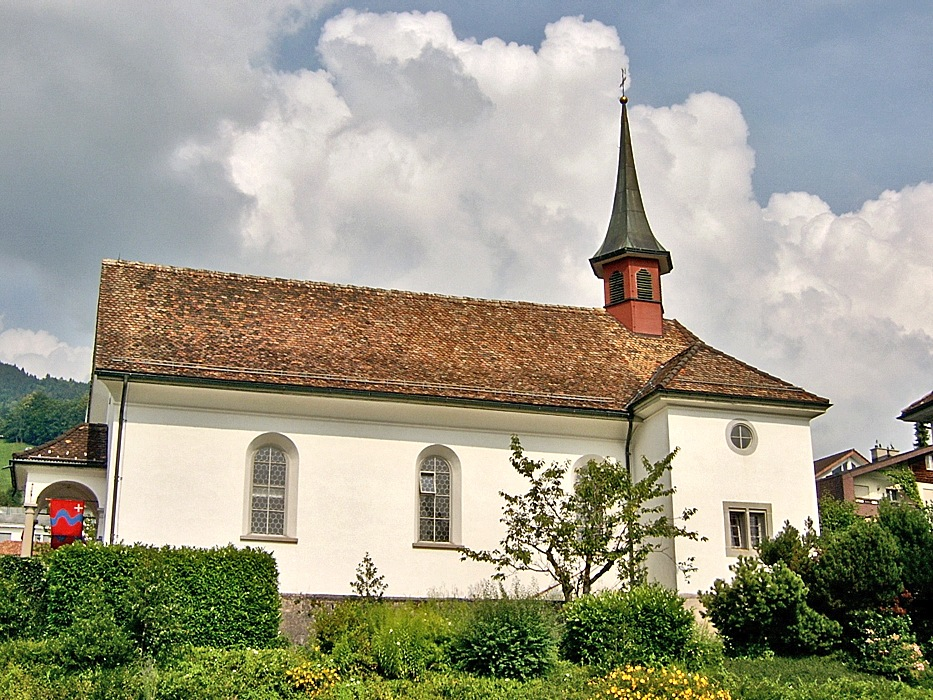
- Kapelle St. Magdalena, Rickenbach

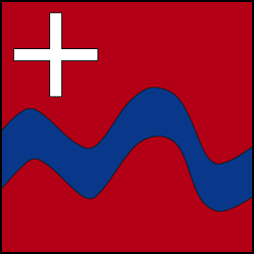
- Flag Coat of arms
- Interactive map of Rickenbach
- Coordinates: 47°0′52.34″N 8°40′11.76″E
- Country: Switzerland
- Canton: Schwyz
- Municipality: Schwyz

Rickenbach (Swiss Standard German pronunciation: [ˈrɪkn̩bax]) is a village in the municipality of Schwyz, itself in the canton of Schwyz in Switzerland. It lies some 1.5 km (0.93 mi) to the east of the town centre of Schwyz.

Aerial view (1968)

The Rotenfluebahn links Rickenbach with the summit of the Rotenfluh mountain, which is, in summer, a popular vantage point over the Lake Lucerne region, and, in winter, a ski area.
