= Furggelenstock =

Mountain in Switzerland

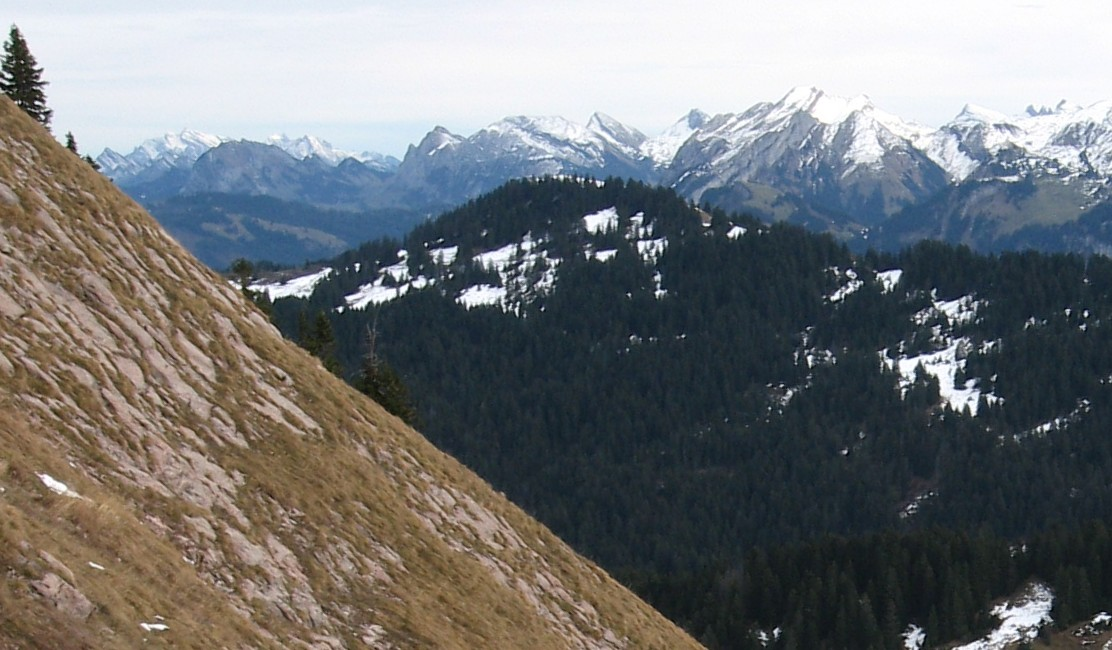
- The Furggelenstock from the west

Highest point
- Elevation: 1,656 m (5,433 ft)
- Prominence: 250 m (820 ft)
- Coordinates: 47°02′19″N 08°43′59″E

Geography
- Location within Switzerland Location within Canton of Schwyz
- Country: Switzerland
- Canton: Schwyz
- Parent range: Schwyzer Alps

Climbing
- Easiest route: Trail

The Furggelenstock (1,656 m or 5,433 ft above sea level) is a mountain of the Swiss Prealps, located west of Oberiberg in the canton of Schwyz. It lies on the range surrounding Alpthal.

== See also ==
- List of mountains of the canton of Schwyz
