= Waag (disambiguation) =

A Weigh house, (waag in the Netherlands) is a public building where goods are weighed.

Waag may also refer to:

- Waag (Amsterdam), a 15th-century building on Nieuwmarkt square in Amsterdam
- Waag, Haarlem, Netherlands, a former weigh house in Haarlem that today serves as a café catering to tourists
- Waag (Paramaribo), a former weigh house in Paramaribo, Suriname
- Waag, Schwyz, a village in the municipality of Unteriberg, Schwyz, Switzerland
- Váh (German: Waag), a river in Slovakia
- Waag (Minster), a river in Switzerland
- WAAG, a radio station licensed to Galesburg, Illinois, United States
