= Schweighof =

Medieval Alpine dairy farm tied to seigneurial lordship

A Schweighof/Schwaighof (plural Schweighöfe; from the Old High German Schweig, meaning a herd) was a type of rural estate specialized in dairy production, founded in the High and Late Middle Ages in the German-speaking Alpine and Pre-Alpine regions of Europe—particularly in Switzerland, the Tyrol, Carinthia, Swabia, and Bavaria— on the initiative of seigneurial lords and closely tied to the system of seigneurial lordship. Such farms served primarily to supply the lords' households with dairy and livestock products, and only secondarily for marketing of surplus.

== Switzerland ==
=== Origins and development ===
In sources concerning the territory of present-day Switzerland, the corresponding Latin term armentum—which has multiple meanings—first appears in the 12th century in connection with the abbeys of Muri in Aargau and Schänis. It is not always possible to determine whether the term refers specifically to Schweighöfe or only to herds or pastures made available to peasants. Many such farms appeared from the second half of the 13th century on the northern edge of the Alps, particularly in Central Switzerland, a phenomenon also observed in Tyrol, Carinthia, Swabia, and Bavaria.

Their creation was due chiefly to the initiative of ecclesiastical lordships and, to a lesser extent, of lay lordships such as the Habsburgs. The abbeys of Einsiedeln and Murbach-Lucerne held Schweighöfe in the present-day canton of Schwyz, and the Fraumünster of Zürich held some in Uri. These farms were established on former lordly demesne land and sometimes formed enclosures within communal pastures, which could provoke disputes with other commoners. This was perhaps one of the reasons why, at the beginning of the 14th century—when the conflict between Schwyz and the abbey of Einsiedeln intensified (the Marchenstreit)—the Schweighöfe became a favored target of the peasants. For the prosperous Schwyz peasant class, the aim was probably also to eliminate competition on the cattle and dairy market. In any case, from the 14th century onward, it appears that urban markets were supplied chiefly by well-off livestock farmers.

=== Operation ===
Located in remote areas, Schweighöfe were generally not integrated into the seigneurial estate but entrusted to third parties under temporary or personal tenancy, rather than under hereditary tenure as was the practice in Tyrol. The holders—at least in 14th-century Central Switzerland—were often mayors (Meier) or other officeholders, who by virtue of their functions maintained good relations with urban markets and who probably subleased the farms to others in turn.

Schweighöfe included a stock of livestock—cattle or sheep—which the tenant had to return at the end of the contract. The lord regularly reserved the right, if necessary, to take the farms back into seigneurial direct cultivation. Until the 16th century, rent was paid in kind: cheese, butter, Ziger, cattle, or sheep. Above a certain level of rent, tenants were entitled, under agreed terms, to grain supplies from the lord.

== Decline ==
Schweighöfe gradually disappeared during the 15th century, giving way to Sennhöfe—dairy and livestock farms that also practiced cereal cultivation.

== Bibliography ==
- F. Glauser, "Von alpiner Landwirtschaft beidseits des St. Gotthards 1000–1350", in Geschichtsfreund, 141, 1988, pp. 5–173.
- R. Sablonier, "Innerschweizer Gesellschaft im 14. Jahrhundert", in Innerschweiz und frühe Eidgenossenschaft, vol. 2, 1990, pp. 145–153.
- A. Zangger, Grundherrschaft und Bauern, 1991, pp. 501–506.

== See also ==
- Common land in Switzerland
- Senn (occupation)
- Alpine transhumance
- Manorialism
