= Marchenstreit =

Medieval and early modern border disputes

Marchenstreit (literally "mark dispute") is the German name for border disputes and conflicts over rights of use that arose in the late Middle Ages and the early modern period between valley communities or municipalities and monasteries. The term derives from the Germanic marcha, meaning a border region or boundary. Such disputes broke out across Europe and were by no means confined to the Alpine region. Their origins lay in collective land use, the shift from arable farming to livestock raising, demographic pressure, efforts at economic expansion, and the colonization of new lands on which rights of sovereignty and ownership were poorly defined.

== Switzerland ==
=== Schwyz and Einsiedeln ===
The best-known such conflict on Swiss territory was that between Schwyz and Einsiedeln Abbey. In 1018 the emperor Henry II had granted the monastery the forests of the upper Sihl valley and the Alpthal. Yet by before 1100 the inhabitants of Schwyz had pushed their land clearances north of the Mythen watershed. After Abbot Gero complained against this continuing advance, the emperor Henry V sided with the monastery in 1114, and at the lawsuit of 1143 the emperor Conrad III in turn confirmed the boundary set in 1114. The pressure from the Schwyzers nevertheless intensified: they opened new pastures, cleared them, and built shelters for the herdsmen. The monastery, whose economic prosperity also depended on this area, reclaimed lands that until then had been only extensively cultivated. This situation was a consequence of the intensification of trade relations with the city of Zurich.

The abbey responded by having its advocates of Rapperswil seize the Schwyzers' livestock and burn the huts. It suffered a setback, however, when in 1217 Count Rudolf II of Habsburg issued a ruling—the authenticity of the document has recently been called into question—that for the first time favored the Schwyzers: the territory of the present communes of Oberiberg and Unteriberg, together with the Alpthal, was attributed to the canton of Schwyz. In the course of the thirteenth century the Schwyzers consequently occupied further land in the abbey's domain. The abbot again invoked the emperor's prerogative to dispose freely of uncultivated lands and hence the legitimacy of the donation of 1018, while the Schwyzer settlers based their claims on customary law.

From 1173 the Habsburgs held the rights of lower justice over Schwyz. When the emperor Rudolf I took over the advocacy of the monastery in 1283, the Marchenstreit, which had originally been chiefly an economic conflict, became increasingly political. The House of Habsburg had to assume its responsibilities as advocate of the monastery. In 1311 the Zurich president of the court of arbitration, Rudolf Mülner the Elder, again attempted mediation, Zurich having an economic interest in concluding peace. Mülner ordered the Schwyzers to restore to the monastery the properties situated in the areas of Studen and Altmatt. The Schwyzer attack on the abbey in 1314 sharpened the conflict and was probably one of the causes of the war of Morgarten of 1315. A settlement was reached only in 1350, with the peace negotiated by Thüring von Attinghausen. The boundaries laid down in detail in that document still essentially form the borders between the districts of Schwyz and Einsiedeln today.

=== Other disputes ===
Similar conflicts broke out in other regions. Uri clashed with Engelberg Abbey between 1375 and 1472 in the area of the Blackenalp below the Surenen Pass (the Engelberg Marchenstreit, settled in 1513) over rights of use and the recognition of territorial boundaries. Further border disputes pitted Schwyz against Uri in the area between the Bisisthal and the Schächental (Galtenäbnet and Ruosalp), Schwyz against Glarus (Euloch and Richisau in the area of the Pragel Pass), Uri against Glarus (Klausen Pass), Hasli against Kerns, and the communities of Bedretto and Faido, as well as, in Valais, Savièse and Conthey.

== Bibliography ==
- A. Riggenbach, Der Marchenstreit zwischen Schwyz und Einsiedeln und die Entstehung der Eidgenossenschaft, 1966.
- P. J. Brändli, "Mittelalterliche Grenzstreitigkeiten im Alpenraum", in Mitteilungen des Historischen Vereins des Kantons Schwyz, 78, 1986, 19–188.
- R. Sablonier, "Innerschweizer Gesellschaft im 14. Jahrhundert", in Innerschweiz und frühe Eidgenossenschaft, 2, 1990, 9–233, especially 143–153.
