= Feuding in Switzerland =

Customary private warfare in medieval and early modern Switzerland

Feuding (German: Fehde; French: faide or guerre privée) was a customary and, in the Middle Ages, broadly legitimate means of pursuing legal claims by force in the territory of present-day Switzerland. Its aim was to punish a wrong or to compel an opponent, through injury and coercion, to acknowledge the feuder's legal position. The feud is regarded as a characteristic feature of the European Middle Ages, and its containment and abolition in the early modern period as a stage on the way to the modern constitutional state. Older historiography interpreted the feud as an expression of robber-knighthood, whereas more recent scholarship recognizes in such self-help a form of enforcing legal claims that was legitimate in the Middle Ages, while also noting its criminal aspects.

Feuds were usually waged by families or clans, though larger communities (communes, valleys, and cantons) were often involved. The means included manslaughter, devastation, arson, robbery, theft, and the arbitrary seizure of pledges, and the grounds were killing, bodily injury, or general enmity. In a European perspective, the blood feud—revenge for murder, serious injury, or affront to honor—is strictly distinguished from the knightly feud, which was permitted only to the nobility (and sometimes to corporate associations) and could be waged over any disputed matter. In Switzerland, however, the right of feud among burghers and peasants does not appear to have been limited to the blood feud; those who waged feuds, including over property claims, came from all social ranks. Although many studies touch on feud cases in Switzerland, the feud has been systematically examined only for Central Switzerland.

== Early and High Middle Ages ==
Feuding is already discernible in the Germanic tribal laws and is described in the writings of Gregory of Tours. According to these early written sources, the feud was a legal instrument accepted alongside the judicial settlement of conflicts. Feuds were common in Switzerland in the High and Late Middle Ages; particularly well documented are the boundary conflict between Schwyz and Einsiedeln Abbey (the Marchenstreit) and the Izzeli-Gruoba feud.

Because feuds had devastating consequences for the parties and harmed the wider population, the earliest written records already document attempts to break them off—through atonement (the Urfehde, an oath not to take revenge) or composition (compensation of the injured party)—and to regulate how they were conducted. More far-reaching efforts to combat feuding came in the 11th century from the Church, which proclaimed the Peace of God. This movement was continued from the 12th to the 14th century by the territorial peaces (Landfrieden) concluded by princes, towns, and—in Switzerland—communal associations; the oldest Swiss pacts have the character of such peace alliances. They sought to limit the feud, to compel the resolution of conflicts by legal means, to improve the pursuit of wrongdoers beyond the borders of a single locality, to strengthen the courts, and to promote the enforcement of law. At first neither the Peace of God nor the territorial peaces had much success, since the judiciary was too little developed and public authority too weak to guarantee the peaceful settlement of claims; under these conditions, self-help was the recognized alternative to court proceedings, especially as the feud was bound up with warfare.

The Peace of God and the territorial peaces nonetheless contributed to the further regulation and restriction of the feud. Criteria developed by which a just feud was distinguished from an unjust one, the most important being a legitimate ground for the feud and a formal declaration of war (Absage). Sometimes the principle of prior complaint also applied: the injured party first had to attempt to achieve its aims by legal means and, failing that, to obtain the ban and excommunication of the opponent before declaring the feud. For the protection of those under feud, places of refuge arose—immunities at inns or on resting-benches beside roads, as well as the right of asylum in churches, chapels, and monasteries, which spread during the High Middle Ages (the oldest traces being at Einsiedeln Abbey around 950).

== Late Middle Ages and early modern period ==
Feuds were waged in Switzerland into the early modern period. Some grew into collective undertakings of a war-like character, such as the Saubannerzug and the campaign against Konstanz in 1495. Because an individual peasant or burgher often lacked the means for a feud (weaponry, a stronghold), feud commissions were assigned to knights, who in turn engaged helpers; analogous to mercenary service, a "feud service" developed, with feud entrepreneurs and feud helpers, becoming a branch of the economy that offered a living or a sideline to knights, mostly of the lesser nobility, and to men of peasant and burgher stock. Smaller feuds could coalesce into a large undertaking that became a catch-basin for various legal disputes and sometimes took on the character of an opposition movement. Many feud leaders operated outside the Confederation along the trade roads, where the confederate cantons were especially vulnerable. Notable examples are the feud of the Valaisan Johann Gruber against the tithings of Valais and the whole Confederation (1390–1430) and the conflicts of the Wolleb of Urseren with Milan, Savoy, and Florentine merchants in the later 15th century. For feud captains and their helpers, the prospect of booty and profit counted for more than the legal claim, and a settlement of the enmity was not economically advantageous and was not sought.

In the late Middle Ages, opposition to the feud found expression in polemical writings, including those produced in connection with the Council of Basel. Containing the feud was a chief concern of the emerging state powers. The Eternal Peace (Ewiger Landfriede) established by King Maximilian I in 1495 was an important stage in the pacification of the Empire: it contained a complete prohibition of the feud, supplemented by the newly created Imperial Chamber Court, to which one could appeal and which could be invoked directly in cases of denial of justice. The confederate cantons, however, did not recognize the Imperial Chamber Court, out of concern for their own jurisdiction. Even so, feuding declined in Switzerland too, owing to the development and enforcement of the monopoly of force by territorial lords, towns, and cantons, which compelled disputing parties to settle peacefully and increasingly criminalized those who waged feuds.

The towns advanced most resolutely and were the first to achieve a restriction and finally the abolition of the feud. In 1399 Count Amadeus VIII of Savoy (the future antipope Felix V) denied the Vaudois nobles the right of feud they claimed. In all confederate territories the duty of pursuit (Nacheile, the pursuit of wrongdoers) and of keeping the peace was established. In 1534 the Diet condemned to death a man from Baden who had sent a declaration of war to the abbey of St. Blaise over material demands and waged a feud against it. The blood feud was restricted to the person of the killer (Lucerne and the Waldstätte, 1379); a composition payment could replace it (for example at Schwyz in 1447); and the killer had to be outlawed and proscribed by a court judgment (Glarus and Schwyz, 16th century). Despite these efforts, the right of blood revenge persisted into the 18th century—at Schwyz a case is recorded as late as 1698. Once regular judicial procedure existed within a power that monopolized the use of force and guaranteed the execution of sentences, feuds lost their character as a legitimate legal instrument. The development of the territorial lordship of the confederate cantons and their associates displaced feuding, and with it ecclesiastical asylum and the places of refuge also disappeared.

== Bibliography ==
- M. Kothing, "Die Blutrache nach schwyzerischen Rechtsquellen", in Der Geschichtsfreund, 12, 1856, 141–152; 13, 1857, 87–91
- I. Müller, Geschichte von Ursern von den Anfängen bis zur Helvetik, 1984, 29–31
- P. Blickle, "Friede und Verfassung", in Innerschweiz und frühe Eidgenossenschaft, 1, 1990, 17–23
- D. Tappy, "Amédée VIII et les coutumes vaudoises: l'abrogation de la 'mauvaise coutume' du droit de guerre privée", in Amédée VIII – Félix V, premier duc de Savoie et pape (1383–1451), ed. B. Andenmatten, A. Paravicini Bagliani, 1992, 299–316
- A. Widmer, "daz ein bùb die eidgnossen angreif." Eine Untersuchung zu Fehdewesen und Raubrittertum am Beispiel der Gruber-Fehde (1390–1430), 1995
