= Gruyère cream =

Double cream produced in Fribourg, Switzerland

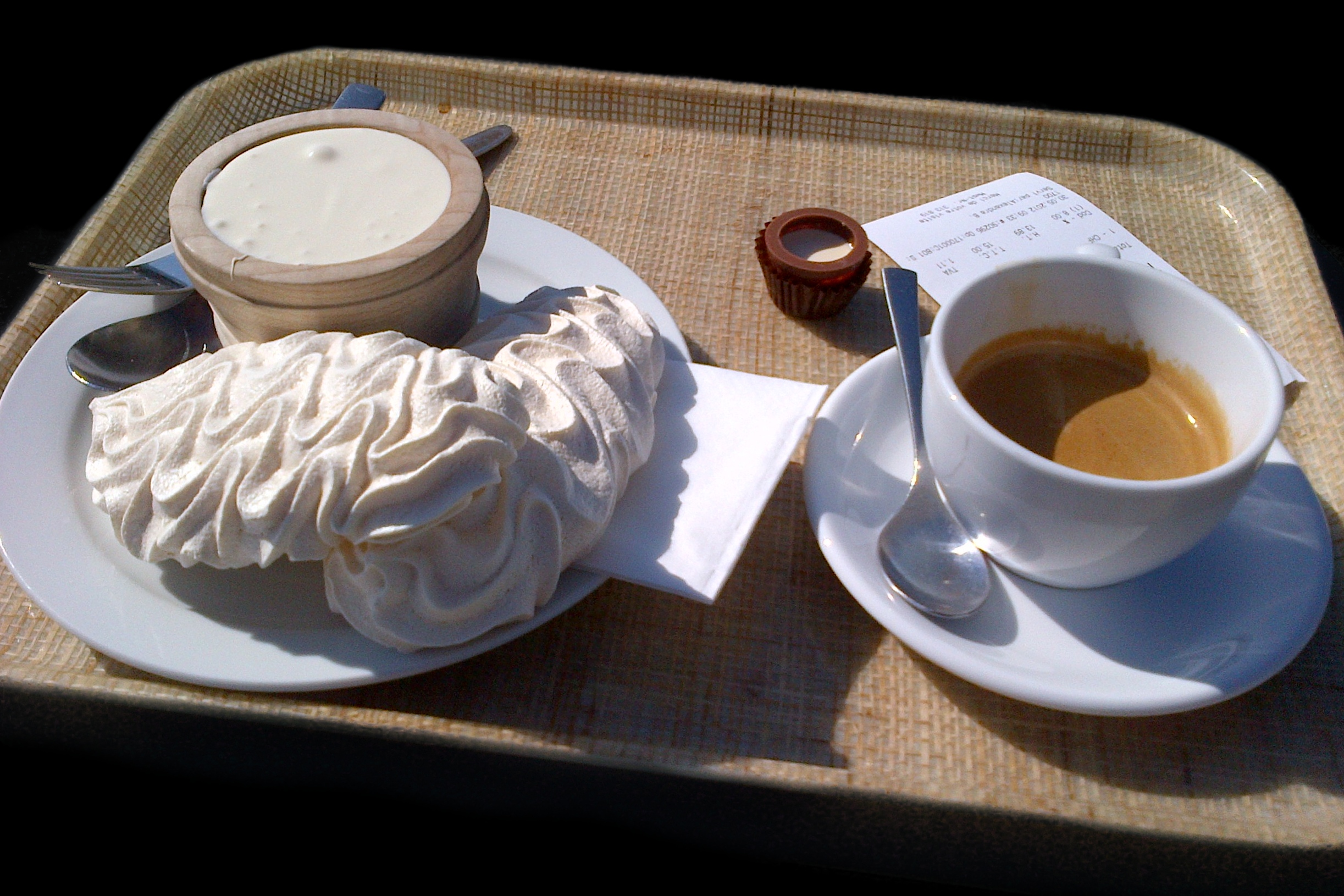
Gruyère cream accompanying meringues

Gruyère cream (French: Crème de Gruyère) is a double cream produced in the canton of Fribourg. It is named after the region of Gruyères, from which it originates. In Switzerland, double cream must contain at least 45% fat while Gruyère cream contains about 50%, which gives it its thickness and smoothness. It is listed in the Culinary Heritage of Switzerland.

Gruyère cheese is notably produced in the same region since the 13th century. Cream production, however, is reputed since the 19th century only. Joseph Favre in particular, a cook from Valais, praised Gruyère cream as one of the finest in Europe, owing its great quality to that of the Alpine pastures. In the early 20th century, Armaillis who went down to the village for mass, brought with them Gruyère cheese and Gruyère cream as an offering for the priest. Nowadays, in the canton of Fribourg, Gruyère cream is found in all dairies and is considered the standard cream, meaning that there is no need to specify when requesting.

Gruyère cream is traditionally served in a wooden tub, with a carved wooden spoon. It is often served along with meringues for dessert (which are served as part of the Bénichon festival meal). Gruyère cream is also served as part of a savoury dish with fritters, bricelets, aniseed bread, croquets, and cuquettes.

== See also ==
- Swiss cheeses and dairy products
- Swiss cuisine
