= Minster (river) =

River in Switzerland

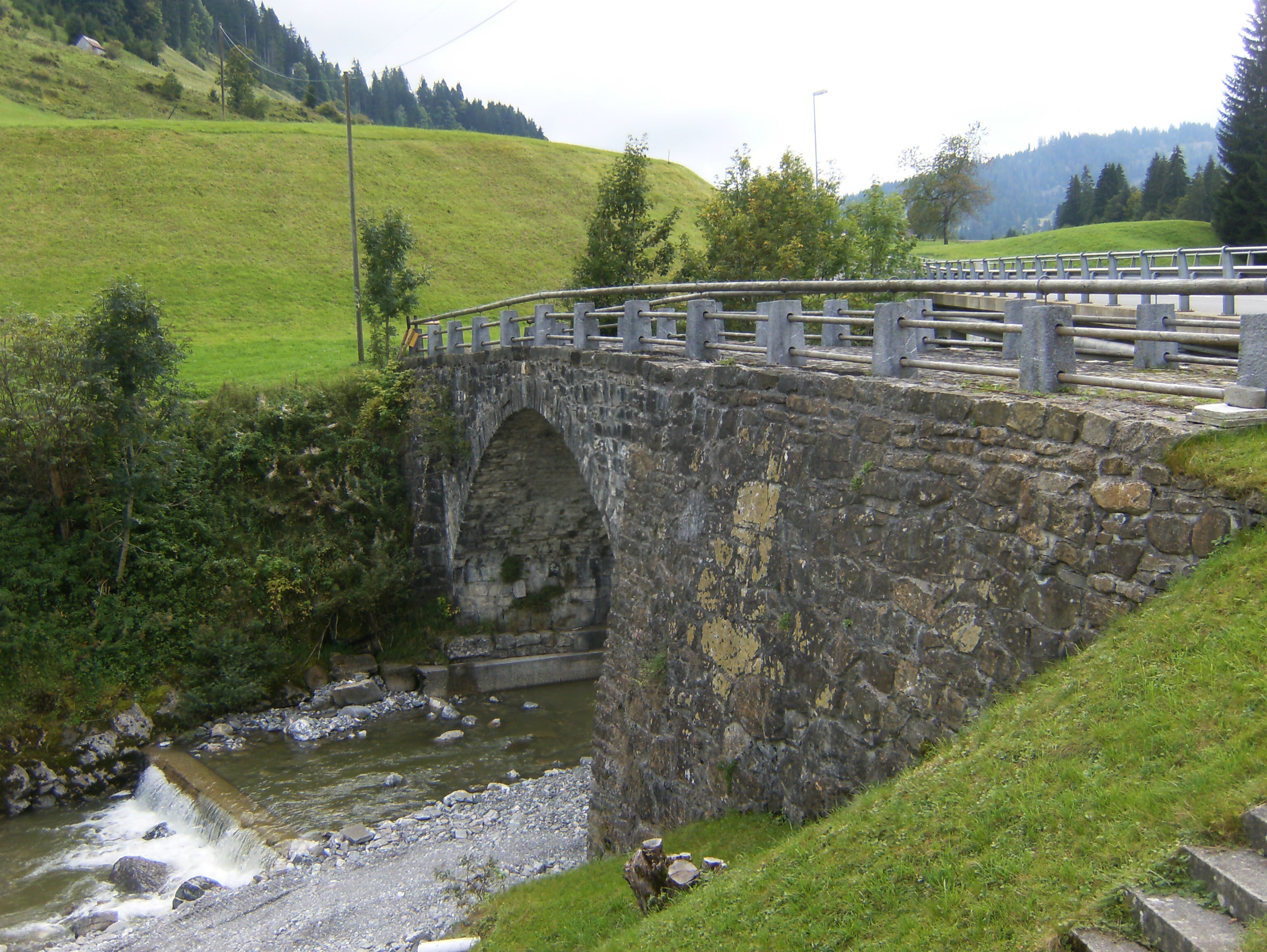
- The Jessenenbruecke over the Minster

Location
- Country: Switzerland

Physical characteristics
- Source
  - location: Canton of Schwyz, Switzerland
- Mouth
  - location: Sihl
  - coordinates: 47.0864°N 8.8110°E
- Length: 13.1 km (8.1 mi)

Basin features
- Progression: Sihl→ Limmat→ Aare→ Rhine→ North Sea

The Minster (Swiss Standard German pronunciation: [ˈmɪnstər]) is a river in the Swiss canton of Schwyz and a tributary of the Sihl river. It has a length of 13.1 km (8.1 mi). Since the creation of the artificial Sihlsee reservoir by impounding the Sihl, the Minster now flows into the reservoir rather than directly into the river.

The river's headwaters lie near the Ibergeregg pass, on the slopes of the Furggelenstock and Firstspitz mountains. From there it flows in a north-western direction to the villages of Oberiberg and Unteriberg. Between the two villages, the river flows under the Jessenenbruecke bridge. Some 1 km (0.62 mi) below this bridge, the Minster receives the waters of the Waag river, whilst a further 1 km (0.62 mi) on, it flows into the southern end of the Sihlsee.

== See also ==
- List of rivers of Switzerland
