= Roggenstock =

Mountain in Switzerland

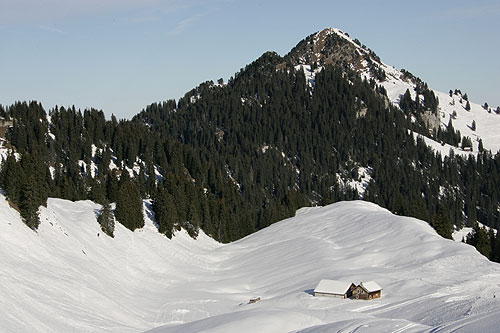
- The Roggenstock from the south

Highest point
- Elevation: 1,778 m (5,833 ft)
- Prominence: 296 m (971 ft)
- Coordinates: 47°01′24″N 08°47′23″E

Geography
- Location within Switzerland Location within Canton of Schwyz
- Country: Switzerland
- Canton: Schwyz
- Parent range: Schwyzer Alps

Climbing
- Easiest route: Trail

The Roggenstock (1,778 m or 5,833 ft) is a mountain of the Swiss Prealps, located south of Oberiberg in the canton of Schwyz. It lies north of the Hoch-Ybrig area.

== See also ==
- List of mountains of the canton of Schwyz
