= Hoch-Ybrig =

Ski resort in Schwyz Canton, Switzerland

Coordinates: 47°01′15″N 08°48′32″E

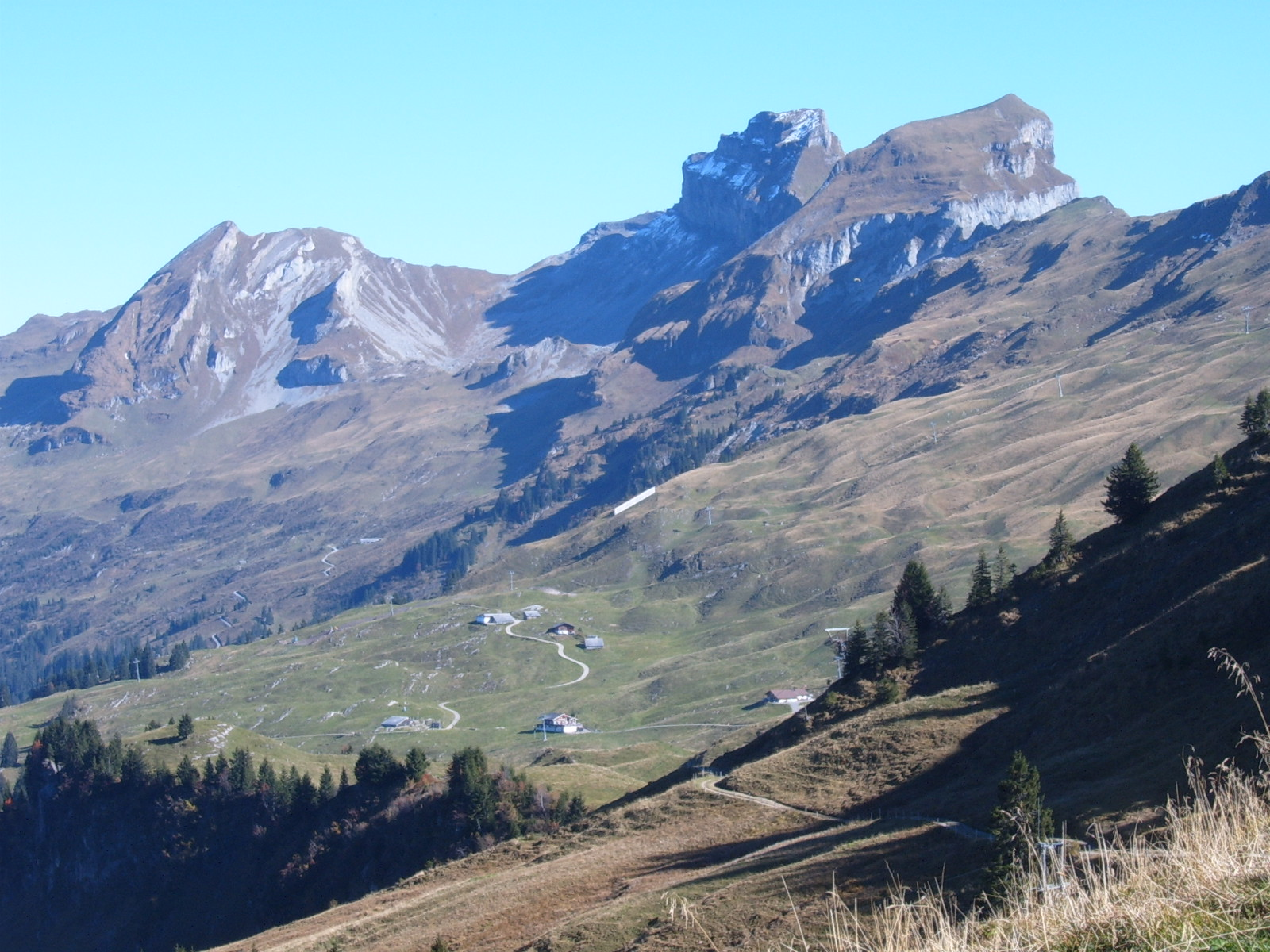
Twäriberg, Drusberg, and Forstberg, seen from Spirstock

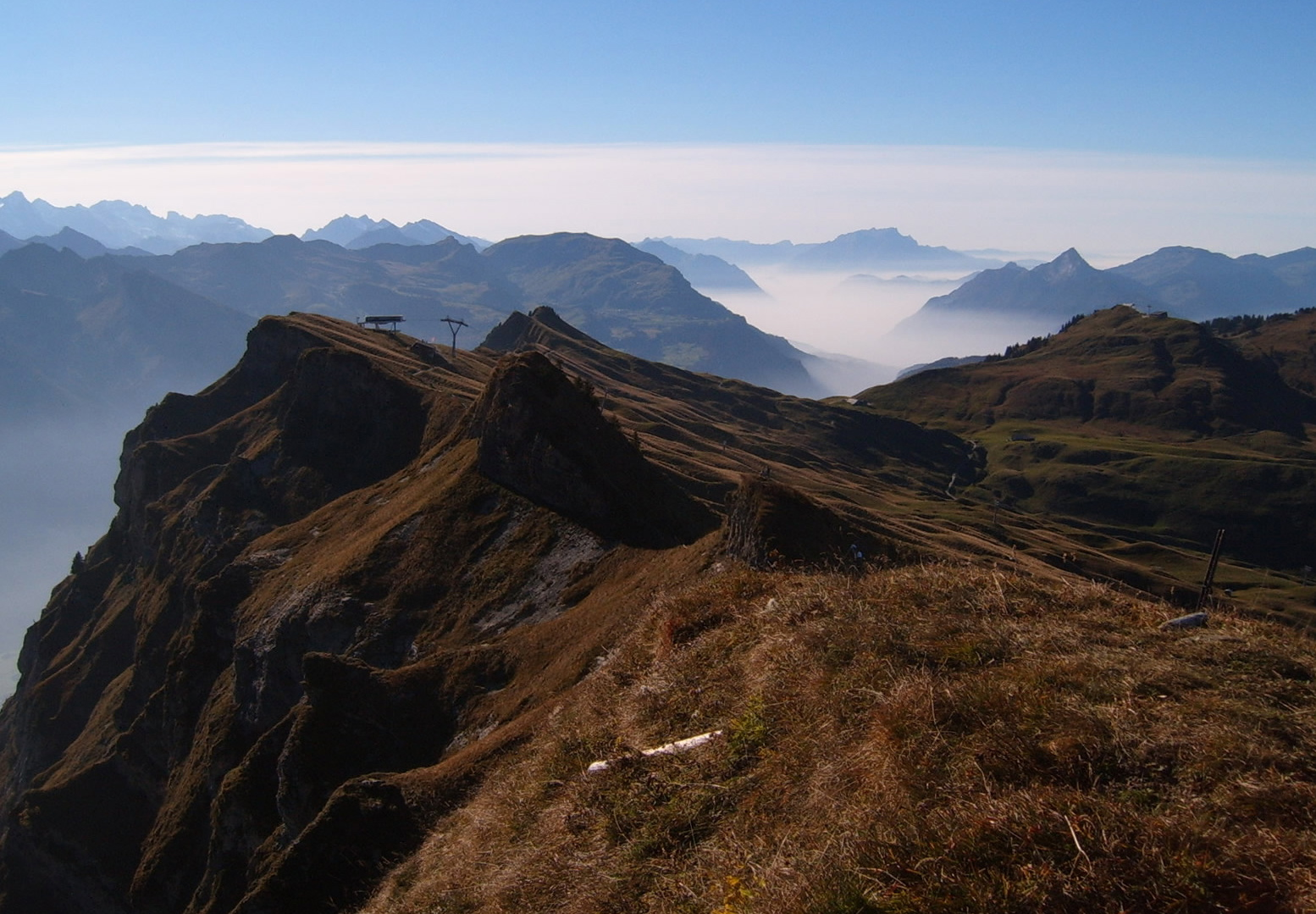
Sternen, Hoch-Ybrig

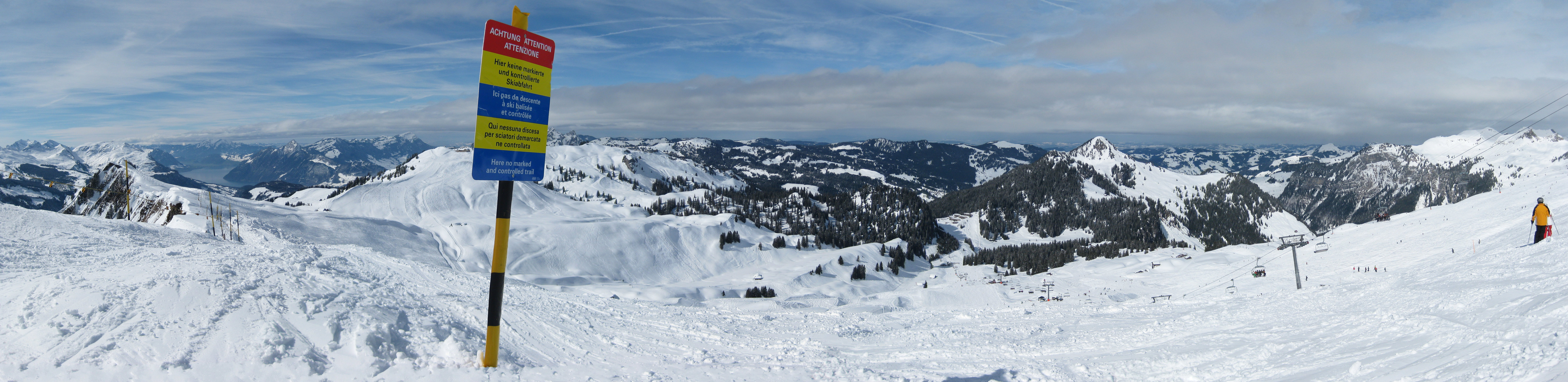
Hoch-Ybrig in Winter

Hoch-Ybrig is a skiing and hiking area in the canton of Schwyz, Switzerland, shared by the municipalities of Unteriberg and Oberiberg.

Hoch-Ybrig is dominated by the mountain range Forstberg - Druesberg (2,282 m / 7,487 ft) - Twäriberg. These mountains of the Schwyzer Alps form a boundary between Hoch-Ybrig on one side and Muotathal valley and the canton of Glarus on the other side.

== Cable cars ==
A cable car leads from Weglosen (1,035 m / 3,396 ft) to Seebli (1,460 m / 4,790 ft) at the feet of Roggenstock. From Seebli, there are chairlift connections to Spirstock (1,771 m / 5,810 ft) and Sternen (1,856 m / 6,089 ft).

== Operating Durations ==
The following table displays the operating hours since the 1968/1969 season.

Climate change is having its effect on the area: even though operating in recent duration stays relatively stable, in the last decade the amount of actual snow has declined heavily. For instance in the 2015/2016 season only after 15 January the full area was operational when there was enough snow on all the pistes. in 2016 during 12 and 13 November about 90 centimetres (35 in) of snow fell, but due to mild temperatures all of it disappeared again in about a week and thus operation could not commence.

The site has 16 snow canons and 3 lances with which they can keep a few slopes open if there is little snow.

Season	Start	End	# Days
1968/69	1968-12-24	1969-04-07	105
1969/70	1969-12-25	1970-05-18	145
1970/71	1970-12-24	1971-04-21	119
1971/72	1971-11-19	1972-04-10	144
1972/73	1972-11-25	1973-05-06	163
1973/74	1973-11-30	1974-04-22	145
1974/75	1974-10-05	1975-05-04	202
1975/76	1975-11-22	1976-05-02	163
1976/77	1976-11-27	1977-05-08	163
1977/78	1977-11-19	1978-05-07	170
1978/79	1978-12-02	1979-05-13	158
1979/80	1979-11-17	1980-05-11	176
1980/81	1980-12-04	1981-04-20	138
1981/82	1981-12-05	1982-05-09	156
1982/83	1982-12-21	1983-05-01	132
1983/84	1983-12-03	1984-05-06	156
1984/85	1984-12-22	1985-04-28	128
1985/86	1985-12-26	1986-04-28	124
1986/87	1986-12-20	1987-05-01	133
1987/88	1987-12-26	1988-04-24	121
1988/89	1988-12-10	1989-04-09	121
1989/90	1989-12-09	1990-04-16	118
1990/91	1990-11-10	1991-04-15	145
1991/92	1991-11-23	1992-05-03	163
1992/93	1992-12-05	1993-04-25	131
1993/94	1993-11-20	1994-04-24	156
1994/95	1994-12-24	1995-04-25	123
1995/96	1995-11-25	1996-04-26	144
1996/97	1996-11-30	1997-04-13	135
1997/98	1997-12-06	1998-04-26	138
1998/99	1998-11-21	1999-05-02	163
1999/2000	1999-11-20	2000-05-01	164
2000/01	2000-12-16	2001-05-01	137
2001/02	2001-12-01	2002-04-28	149
2002/03	2002-12-07	2003-04-27	135
2003/04	2003-12-20	2004-05-02	135
2004/05	2004-11-27	2005-04-24	149
2005/06	2005-12-07	2006-04-23	138
2006/07	2006-12-13	2007-04-16	125
2007/08	2007-11-17	2008-04-20	156
2008/09	2008-11-26	2009-04-19	145
2009/10	2009-12-05	2010-04-18	135
2010/11	2010-12-01	2011-04-10	131
2011/12	2011-12-17	2012-04-15	121
2012/13	2012-12-08	2013-04-14	128
2013/14	2013-11-30	2014-04-21	141
2014/15	2014-12-24	2015-04-12	109
2015/16	2015-11-28	2016-04-10	134

== See also ==
- List of mountains of the canton of Schwyz
- List of ski areas and resorts in Switzerland
- Swiss Alps
