= Korporation =

Bodies that hold common land in Switzerland

In Switzerland, Korporationen (singular Korporation) are corporate bodies that grew out of the shared use of the medieval common lands (Gemeinmarchen), namely commons (Allmenden), forests and alpine pastures. They are based on the Germanic tradition of cooperative law. They took shape as corporate bodies in the late Middle Ages. In the 19th century their members tried to withdraw their property from the reach of the public authorities, and in many places corporation citizens' communities (Korporationsbürgergemeinden) were formed. Many corporations still exist today; in most cantons they are public-law corporations with a guarantee of their property and extensive autonomy.

== Origins ==
In the 19th century, the view arose that corporations developed from original mark associations (Markgenossenschaften). This view is now considered outdated. Rather, groups of people used forests, pastures, alpine pastures, waters and paths in common and in this way gradually took on corporate structures. The development into corporations proper took place only in the late Middle Ages, when the cooperative use of the common lands was tightened and better organized because of the growing population and the increasing importance of cattle farming.

The corporations came into being in different ways. In many places, as settlement developed and new land was opened up (Landesausbau), the farmers gradually brought land that belonged to no lord into their cooperative use. Where manorial lordships (Grundherrschaften) existed, as for example in Vaud, Einsiedeln and Appenzell, the lords determined and organized the use of the common lands, or at least approved the statutes issued by the members (Genossen). In Ursern and in the Walser communities in Graubünden, the use of the common lands was left to the new settlers as an incentive. Some corporations acquired their common property (Genossengüter) wholly or partly by purchase.

== Development ==
The corporations did not develop in a uniform way either. Commons associations (Allmendgenossenschaften) that originally covered large areas split into several smaller corporations as smaller settlement groups took up separate uses (Sondernutzungen). Many of these confined themselves entirely to the use of their common property. Others took on state tasks and developed into village associations (Dorfgenossenschaften), the forerunners of today's municipalities. Most towns also had common property. In a few places, for example in Uri and Schwyz, whole valley communities (Talschaften) or rural cantons (Länder) held the use of the common lands. The corporate and state activities of the corporations were often combined into a single unit.

From the late Middle Ages, and increasingly under the Ancien régime, the corporations, villages, towns and rural cantons sought to restrict the use of the common property and to reserve it for the long-established inhabitants. Besides descent, residence or the ownership of a property within the fixed circle of members was often made a condition for the right of use. Some corporations dissolved when their property was divided up.

The liberal constitutional development of the 19th century, marked by a growth in the tasks of the state, strengthened this tendency toward separation: the members of the corporations tried to withdraw their property from the reach of the public authorities. As a result, the citizens' communities (Bürgergemeinden) came into being alongside the residents' municipalities (Einwohnergemeinden); they administered part of the citizens' property, mainly for welfare purposes. In addition, in many places, partly out of the guilds, corporation citizens' communities (Korporationsbürgergemeinden; in Ticino the patriziati) were formed, which still claim the rights and duties that arise from the use of the common lands. Membership in them, however, is no longer a condition for municipal and Swiss citizenship.

== Today ==
Many corporations that are not tied to the territory of a municipality still exist. In most cantons they are considered public-law corporations (Körperschaften des öffentlichen Rechts) with a guarantee of their property and extensive autonomy. In the 20th century associations of the citizens' communities and corporations were formed in many cantons, and in 1945 they united to form a Swiss association of the same name, the Schweizerischer Verband der Bürgergemeinden und Korporationen.

== Bibliography ==
- P. Caroni, Le origini del dualismo comunale svizzero, 1964
- P. Liver, "Das Dorf", in Abhandlungen zur schweizerischen und bündnerischen Rechtsgeschichte, 1970, 122–132
- R. Göpfert, Festschrift zur 50. Generalversammlung des Schweizerischen Verbandes der Bürgergemeinden und Korporationen, 1994
- J. Petermann, Die luzernischen Korporationsgemeinden, 1994
- A. Hubli, Die Genossamen Schillingsrüti und Sattelegg, 1995
- A. Jörger, Genossame Wangen: Geschichte einer Allmeindgenossenschaft in der March, Kanton Schwyz, 2000
- H. Stadler-Planzer, P. Stadler, Die Korporation Pfäffikon SZ: Grundlagen, Entstehung, Entfaltung, 2008
