= Common land in Switzerland =

Collective land use rights in Swiss agrarian society

Common land in Switzerland (German: Allmend; French: biens communaux), refers to land over which a defined community holds collective use rights. It is distinct from both private property, in which an individual owner may exclude others, and from public land, which is owned and managed by the state for general access; common land is instead controlled by a specific group whose members hold defined rights to exploit it, typically for grazing, timber, or other natural resources.

In Switzerland, this system structured rural life from the Middle Ages until the liberal reforms of the nineteenth century. The Allmend — comprising pastures, woodland, and wasteland set aside for collective use — formed a distinct third economic zone alongside arable fields and farmsteads in the typical village economy. Until the nineteenth century, peasant, sub-peasant, and artisan households depended heavily on access to these collective resources, and their regulation played a central role in the life of rural settlements and small towns alike.

These collective rights are distinct from individual usufruct rights tied to a specific person, such as a life annuity (Leibrente), a lifelong right of residence, or a benefice (Pfrund). Disputes over common land were among the most frequent forms of social conflict in premodern Swiss society. Institutional descendants of the system survive today in parts of Switzerland in the form of Bürgergemeinden, Korporationen, and alpine cooperatives, though their legal basis and extent vary considerably by canton.

== Origins and medieval development ==
The question of when and how common land emerged was debated in Swiss legal history from the late nineteenth century into the recent past. One school of thought, drawing on classical sources and early Germanic law codes such as the Lex Salica, argued for origins in prehistoric Germanic times: the land seized by Germanic hundreds (tribal groupings of roughly a hundred households) was supposedly exploited collectively from the outset, with individual use developing only later as clan structures dissolved, leaving the Allmend as the last remnant of collective ownership — the Markgenossenschaft theory. Critics of this view argued instead that individual land use preceded collective arrangements, and that the need to define and regulate common land only arose during the high medieval period of clearance and settlement expansion, when previously extensive and loosely used peripheral zones came under pressure from competing groups.

This second view is supported by findings from settlement and economic history: the village with its collectively organized field system is a phenomenon of the high Middle Ages, whereas the early medieval period was characterized by more fluid, often shifting hamlets and individually organized farming. In the early medieval period, as long as land resources were sufficient, the boundary between cultivated land and common land was fluid — parts of the commons could be temporarily ploughed, use was largely unrestricted, and conflicts were resolved by neighborly agreement. There may have been differences between the more lordship-dominated plateau and the less lordship-penetrated Alpine regions in how common land use was regulated even then.

The Allmend played a fundamental role in livestock farming until the introduction of summer stall-feeding. Beyond grazing on meadows and stubble fields, forests were pastured — particularly by pigs, the main source of meat in the Middle Ages, fattened on acorns and beechnuts in autumn. Forests also provided construction and firewood, and the gathering of fruits, berries, and mushrooms supplemented the diet or provided relief in times of famine. The Allmend also served as a land reserve that could be drawn upon as needed.

The process by which commons were formally demarcated from other agricultural zones, and their user groups defined and regulated, unfolded gradually, varying by region and period. In the plateau, the Allmend was definitively separated from arable land in the twelfth and thirteenth centuries, at the height of the medieval settlement expansion, as the village and the open-field system became established. In the Alps and pre-Alps, an analogous development began in the fourteenth century, linked to growing specialization in market-oriented livestock farming. In central Switzerland, predominantly private alps oriented toward subsistence were established in the eleventh and twelfth centuries, while from the late thirteenth through the fifteenth centuries, cooperatively managed alps and high pastures grew in number. The circle of entitled users began to close from the mid-fifteenth century onward, following the demographic and economic crisis of the late Middle Ages; entry to the commons often required long-standing ownership of a farmstead within the village, and newcomers had to purchase the right with an entry fee. The impetus for cooperative foundations appears to have come both from the wealthier peasantry — increasingly oriented toward livestock raising and trade and supplying urban markets — and from seigneurial authorities.

== Usage rights in the early modern period ==
In the early modern period, usage rights were progressively narrowed, both in terms of who was entitled to them and how they could be exercised. Villages in all agricultural zones depended on the Allmend: in the grain-growing lowlands (Kornland) of the plateau, draft animals — oxen and horses — relied mainly on common pasture because hay reserves would have lasted only a few weeks, while cows, small livestock, and dairy cattle accompanied them on the commons. In alpine areas, where livestock raising and dairy farming played a greater role, the commons were needed not only for summer grazing but for pasture in other seasons as well. User collectives also closed themselves off from outsiders by imposing higher entry fees or denying access altogether, while attempting to restrict the rights of their economically weaker members.

Two systems emerged for defining the circle of entitled users: real law and personal law. In real-law associations (Realrechtsverbände), usage rights were tied to a house or landholding — the Gerechtigkeit (known as Rechtsame in the canton of Bern) — and formed an important component of municipal citizenship rights. In personal-law associations (Personalrechtsverbände), rights depended on membership in the community, sometimes restricted to long-established families. When population grew sharply in the sixteenth century, real-law communes fixed the number of usage rights numerically to protect the commons from overuse; in personal-law associations, population growth inevitably increased the number of entitled users, gradually diminishing each individual's share. Allocation of grazing rights was based on an assessment of the carrying capacity of the village territory, and in some areas this was formally determined in advance through a process called Seyung. Despite these measures, conflicts over the commons were frequent — notably between owners of large and small livestock.

Within the circle of entitled users, benefits were usually graduated. Widely used was the Winterungsregel, which allowed the driving of cattle to pasture only if the owner had wintered them on their own fodder. Originally intended to anchor a needs-based principle and exclude speculative large farmers and cattle traders from driving foreign livestock onto the commons, this rule increasingly favored large livestock holders as scarcity grew. Exceptions were sometimes made for the poor, who were permitted to drive a leased cow onto the commons.

In the villages of the plateau, access to wood and pasture was often graduated by ownership class — full peasants (Bauern) versus smallholders and cottagers (Tauner) — defined either by possession of a plough team or more precisely by landholding size. Large farms needed more pasture and wood than small ones, which gave the graduated system a practical rationale, but as the landless underclass grew, the unequal distribution became increasingly contested. Where full peasants held their own pastures and woodlands, more egalitarian arrangements sometimes prevailed: livestock numbers were capped and wood allocations distributed equally.

== Reduction of common land ==
Individual shares declined not only due to population growth but also because the total area of collective land shrank. In the sixteenth century, forests were cleared throughout Switzerland, commons were converted to settlement or private exploitation, and enclosures (Einschläge) eliminated part of the grazing rights over arable land and meadows. Many communes issued forest ordinances (Holzordnungen) from the second half of the sixteenth century, regulating access to increasingly scarce woodland. Commons divisions (Allmendteilungen) — the last step in a centuries-long process of converting communal into private property — are attested from the fifteenth century in the pre-Alpine zone, for example in the Emmental, becoming more frequent, though generally partial, in the sixteenth and seventeenth centuries and spreading to the grain-growing lowlands.

In the eighteenth century, the conflict over common pastures intensified. Cottagers (Tauner) used the commons mainly for their small livestock, while full and half-peasants wanted to graze their draft animals there, setting the subsistence needs of the village underclass against the interests of the grain farmers. Agronomists of the Enlightenment advocated for the partition of the commons, arguing that meadows would be better maintained and livestock better fed; in a prize competition of the Bernese Economic Society, both a pastor and a country gentleman argued in their winning entries for the distribution of common pastures. Despite such debates, the commons generally remained intact under the Ancien Régime, though it became increasingly common practice to assign garden plots on common land — even in common forests — to needy villagers, sometimes for a limited period and sometimes permanently.

Under the influence of the physiocrats, larger areas of common land were redistributed in the eighteenth century, benefiting smallholders and the landless who were interested in garden plots rather than pasture. Further collective land was lost in the second half of the century, when much of the plateau abandoned fallow-field grazing in favor of fodder crops as part of the agrarian reform movement, allowing livestock to be kept in stalls year-round and manure spread directly on fields.

== Conflicts ==
Disputes over common land were among the most frequent forms of social conflict in premodern Swiss agrarian society, well documented in local and regional monographs, though broader social-historical studies remain rare. Their frequency reflects the central importance of collective landholding: most land outside the cultivated fields belonged to village communities or larger user associations, and once these resources became scarce, rules became necessary — and contested.

Within villages, conflicts arose because the interests of inhabitants varied according to the size and composition of their holdings. Large livestock owners sought unrestricted use of the commons as pasture, while landless villagers wanted to plant cereals, vegetables, and — in the eighteenth century — potatoes. The overlapping of usage rights also generated friction: arable fields and mown meadows had to be opened to village livestock after the harvest. On alpine pastures, external rights of way, watering, snow-refuge, and pre- and post-season grazing were sources of recurring disputes, often unresolved because rights and boundaries had not been defined precisely enough, allowing the same conflicts to reemerge after each settlement.

=== Types of conflict ===
Several distinct conflict types can be identified by the parties involved:

- Subjects versus lords: Local nobles typically held large agricultural estates and had an interest in grazing and wood. The growing reception of Roman law and the intensification of lordship in the early modern period led territorial lords to claim eminent domain over all common land. Invoking the jus domini, they levied ground rents on enclosures and — rarely successfully in Switzerland — attempted to assert active participation in usage rights.
- Between neighboring communities: Pastures, forests, and alps were often originally shared between neighboring settlements. Conflicts led to the demarcation of reserved zones, though overlapping uses generally persisted. Neighboring villages frequently held joint grazing rights on open fields in border areas, and disputes arose when one village drove livestock onto fields the other had not yet harvested.
- Between social groups within a community: Conflicts often ran along lines between peasants, smallholders, and cottagers (Tauner) with diverging claims on the commons. Full members of a user association might also be opposed by residents with lesser rights, or artisans by farmers — millers and meadow owners disputing water rights, for instance.
- External users versus village members: Miners, glassmakers, saltpeter producers, and charcoal burners who had obtained wood-cutting rights as part of a commercial license from the authorities came into conflict with local inhabitants over forest use.

=== Resolution and enforcement ===
Conflicts were adjudicated by seigneurial courts; in the subject territories of the city-states, from the fifteenth century onward by the bailiff (Landvogt) and — on appeal — by the urban council. The council often sided with poorer villagers, both to maintain social peace and because it had an interest in preserving a large subject population and military manpower. Where conflicts involved settlements under different sovereigns, proceedings became more complex, overlapping with boundary disputes (such as the Marchenstreit) and typically requiring arbitration tribunals.

Violence is attested mainly in conflicts between communities: in late medieval alpine disputes, plundering, destruction of buildings and equipment, and physical attacks on persons are documented. Within a single village, violence appears to have been the exception, as the dense network of kinship ties binding different social groups together — particularly in the early modern period — had a moderating effect.

Peaks in conflict frequency correspond to periods of sustained population growth: around 1300 at the end of the high medieval expansion, in the second half of the sixteenth century, and in the late eighteenth century. These conflicts should not, however, be interpreted solely as struggles over shrinking resources: many arose as a consequence of successful economic transformations — such as the expansion of alpine farming in the late Middle Ages, or the enclosure movement — in which some groups gained while others were displaced and resisted.

== Dissolution ==
The Helvetic Republic (1798–1803) marked a turning point. For the first time, the political municipality (Einwohnergemeinde) and the user association (Bürgergemeinde, Korporation) were clearly separated in law, with the Allmend remaining with the latter. A wave of commons divisions followed, and increasingly also forest partitions; the initiative came almost always from middling peasants, while large farmers and the landless population — who depended on fallen wood gathered in forests — generally opposed the changes. After the collapse of the Helvetic Republic, the old arrangements were partially restored.

It was only from the Regeneration period (1830s) onward that collective usage rights were definitively detached from communes, valley communities, and similar bodies. They were either distributed among all shareholders or transferred to newly constituted commons, alp, and timber corporations organized along liberal property principles; after this separation, only those who could demonstrate corresponding shares retained any usage rights. The Allmend has survived in this institutional form in many parts of Switzerland to the present, though the landholdings of Bürgergemeinden have diminished in many areas.

== Legacy ==
Collective land management did not disappear entirely after the nineteenth-century reforms. In many parts of Switzerland, common land survived in institutional form through Bürgergemeinden, Korporationen, and alpine cooperatives — direct descendants of the medieval user associations — which continue to manage forests, pastures, and alpine land on behalf of their members. The extent and legal basis of these institutions varies considerably by canton: some cantons have no Bürgergemeinden, with political communes handling equivalent responsibilities, while in central Switzerland Korporationen remain significant landowners. These modern institutions are distinct from publicly owned land such as cantonal or federal forests, to which general public access rights apply independently of membership in any user community.

The Swiss tradition of collective land management attracted wider scholarly attention through the work of Elinor Ostrom, who used the village of Törbel in the canton of Valais as a central case study in her landmark 1990 work Governing the Commons: The Evolution of Institutions for Collective Action. The community of Törbel had collectively managed its meadows, forests, and water channels since at least 1483. Ostrom's research on how communities can successfully manage shared resources without state control or privatization was awarded the Nobel Memorial Prize in Economic Sciences in 2009.

== Bibliography ==
- Chevallaz, G.A., Aspects de l'agriculture vaudoise à la fin de l'Ancien Régime, 1949, pp. 66–73
- Bader, K.S., Dorfgenossenschaft und Dorfgemeinde, 1962
- Bader, K.S., Studien zur Rechtsgeschichte des mittelalterlichen Dorfes, 3 vols., 1957–1973
- Häusler, F., Das Emmental im Staate Bern bis 1798, vol. 2, 1968
- Walter, F., Les campagnes fribourgeoises à l'âge des révolutions, 1983
- Rogger, D., Obwaldner Landwirtschaft im Spätmittelalter, 1989, pp. 49–58, 245–270
- Sablonier, R., "Innerschweizer Gesellschaft im 14. Jahrhundert", in Innerschweiz und frühe Eidgenossenschaft, vol. 2, 1990, pp. 64, 91–99
- Trevisan, P., "Der Solothurner 'Rechtsamestreit'", in Schweiz im Wandel, ed. S. Brändli et al., 1990, pp. 363–381
- Zumkeller, D., Le paysan et la terre, 1992
- Meier, B.; Sauerländer, D., Das Surbtal im Spätmittelalter, 1995, pp. 278–290
- Ineichen, A., Innovative Bauern, 1996, pp. 163–170
- Deplazes, L., "Una lite fra due vicinanze bleniesi all'inizio del XIII secolo", in MDT, ser. 3, pp. 105–129
- Suter, A., "Troublen" im Fürstbistum Basel (1726–1740), 1985
- Brändli, P.J., "Mittelalterliche Grenzstreitigkeiten im Alpenraum", in MHVS, 78, 1986, pp. 18–188
- Deplazes, L., Alpen, Grenzen, Pässe im Gebiet Lukmanier-Piora (13.–16. Jahrhundert), 1986
- Hürlimann, K., Soziale Beziehungen im Dorf, 2000
- Ostrom, E., Governing the Commons: The Evolution of Institutions for Collective Action, Cambridge University Press, 1990
