= Oberhasli (disambiguation) =

Oberhasli may refer to:

- Oberhasli, a historical region in the Bernese Oberland in the canton of Berne, Switzerland
- Oberhasli District, a former district
- Oberhasli (goat), a breed of goat named after the Bernese district
- Oberhasli, a settlement of the municipality Niederhasli, Zurich canton, Switzerland

== See also ==
- Hasli (disambiguation)
