= Kleiner Mythen =

Mountain in the Schwyzer Alps of Central Switzerland

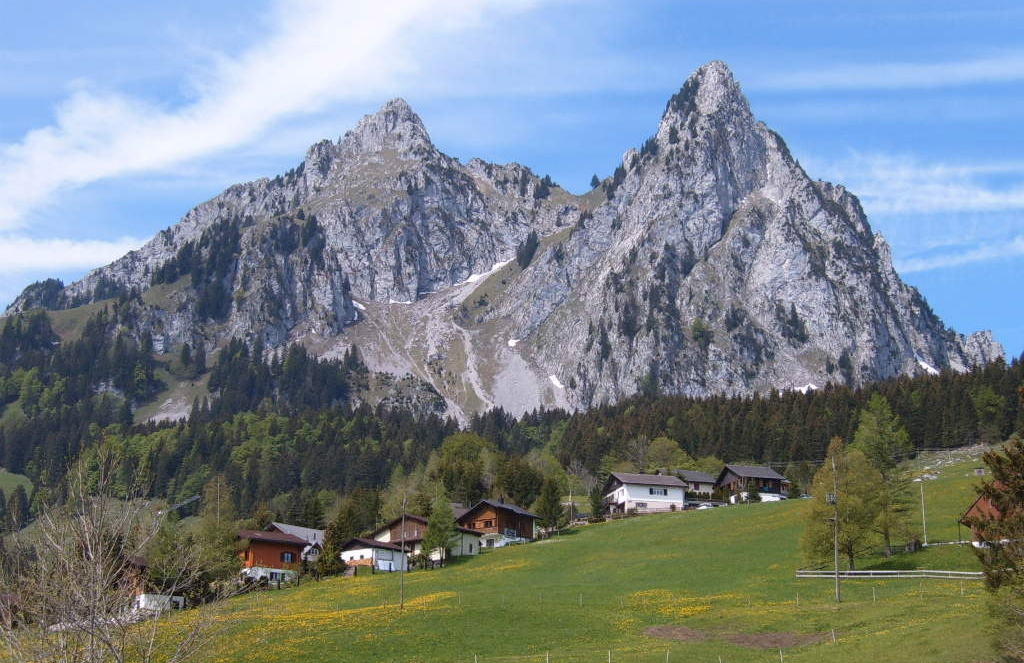
- Kleiner Mythen (left) and Haggenspitz (right)

Highest point
- Elevation: 1,811 m (5,942 ft)
- Prominence: 373 m (1,224 ft)
- Parent peak: Grosser Mythen
- Coordinates: 47°02′26.5″N 8°41′05.2″E

Geography
- Location within Switzerland Location within Canton of Schwyz
- Country: Switzerland
- Canton: Schwyz
- Parent range: Schwyzer Alps

The Kleiner Mythen (lit. 'Small Mythen') is a mountain in the Schwyzer Alps of Central Switzerland. The mountain lies in the canton of Schwyz, to the east of the town of Schwyz, to the south of the village of Alpthal in the valley of the Alp river, and to the north of the Grosser Mythen. The summit to the north of Kleiner Mythen is called Haggenspitz (1,761 m [5,778 ft]).

== See also ==
- List of mountains of the canton of Schwyz
