= Waag (Minster) =

River in Switzerland

Location
- Country: Switzerland

Physical characteristics
- Source
  - location: Canton of Schwyz, Switzerland
  - elevation: 911m
- Mouth
  - location: Oberiberg, Schwyz District
  - coordinates: 47°03′44″N 8°48′38″E
- Length: 7.9 km (4.9 mi)

Basin features
- Progression: Minster→ Sihl→ Limmat→ Aare→ Rhine→ North Sea

The Waag is a river in the Swiss canton of Schwyz and a tributary of the Minster river. It has a length of 7.9 km (4.9 mi).

== Course of the river ==
The Waag rises in the mountains of Gross Stärnen and Chli Stärnen at the Schwyz Alps, in the municipality of Oberiberg, and flows north-northeast into the village of Unteriberg.

At Laueli, the Waag reaches the valley floor, where the artificial Sihlsee reservoir flows into it. It initially crosses the valley in a north-easterly direction, before it takes the Weglosenbach at the Weglosen valley station and turns north. Immediately afterwards, the Gänigenbach flows into it from the east in Fuchsenweid, than proceeds to flow alongside the H386 road.

The Waag passes Lehweid, Hintertwingi, Twingi and Vordertwingi, where the Sitibach flows towards it from the east, before it resumes its northeasterly course. It then passes the villages of Waag and Herti, before finally flowing into the Minster river.

== See also ==
- List of rivers of Switzerland
