= Izzeli-Gruoba feud =

1257–1258 feud in the valley of Uri

- Date: 1257–1258
- Type: Feud
- Cause: Enmity between the Izzeli and Gruoba clans
- Participants: Izzeli clan • Gruoba clan
- Outcome: Reconciliation imposed by Rudolf of Habsburg at Altdorf (23 December 1257); renewed intervention (20 May 1258) after the Izzeli broke the treaty

The Izzeli-Gruoba feud was a feud (faide) that set the Uri clans of the Izzeli and the Gruoba against each other in 1257. Unable to restore peace themselves, the people of the valley appealed to Count Rudolf of Habsburg, who imposed a reconciliation at Altdorf on 23 December 1257. Four men of Uri were charged with upholding the treaty, but on 20 May 1258 the count had to intervene again, as the Izzeli had broken it. The clan had to pay a heavy fine, and the ringleaders were stripped of their property.

The events have been interpreted in various ways. They are now regarded as a notable step in the efforts to abolish the practice of feuding and in the communalization of justice in early Switzerland.

== Bibliography ==
- P. Blickle, "Friede und Verfassung", in Innerschweiz und frühe Eidgenossenschaft, 1, 1990, 13–202, esp. 17–23
- A. Stadler, Uri, 1, 229–232
