= Alpthal =

- Municipality
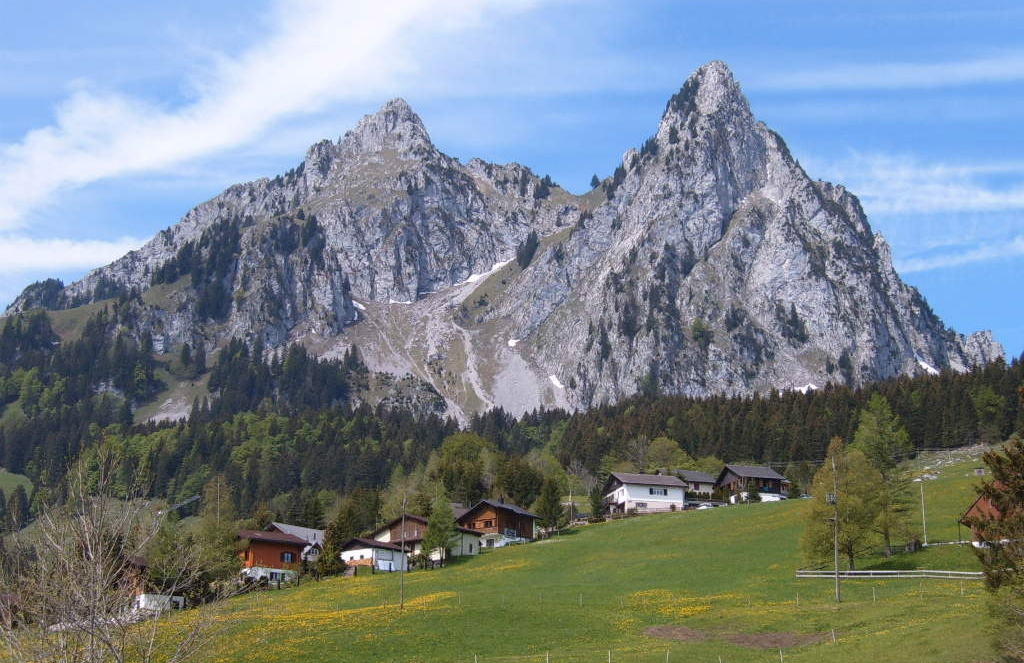

- Coat of arms
- Location of Alpthal
- Location within Switzerland Location within Canton of Schwyz
- Coordinates: 47°4.2′N 8°42.9′E
- Country: Switzerland
- Canton: Schwyz
- District: Schwyz

Area
  - Total: 22.90 km^{2} (8.84 sq mi)
- Elevation (Kirche Alpthal): 996 m (3,268 ft)

Population (December 2020)
  - Total: 613
  - Density: 26.8/km^{2} (69.3/sq mi)
- Time zone: UTC+01:00 (CET)
  - Summer (DST): UTC+02:00 (CEST)
- Postal code: 8849
- SFOS number: 1361
- ISO 3166 code: CH-SZ
- Localities: Eigen, Alpthal, Brunni, Holzegg
- Surrounded by: Einsiedeln, Oberiberg, Rothenthurm, Schwyz
- Website: www.alpthal.ch

Alpthal is a village and municipality in Schwyz District in the canton of Schwyz in Switzerland. Besides the village of Alpthal, the municipality includes the ski resort of Brunni, and settlement of Eigen.

== History ==
Alpthal is first mentioned in 1018 as Albetal. A branch of the Camino de Santiago pilgrimage route connected Einsiedeln with Schwyz via Alpthal and the Haggenegg.

Winter tourism first came to Alpthal in 1950, with the opening of the cable car from Brunni to the Holzegg. Brunni acquired its first ski lift in 1964, and the Brunni-Haggenegg ski area was commissioned in 1974.

== Geography ==
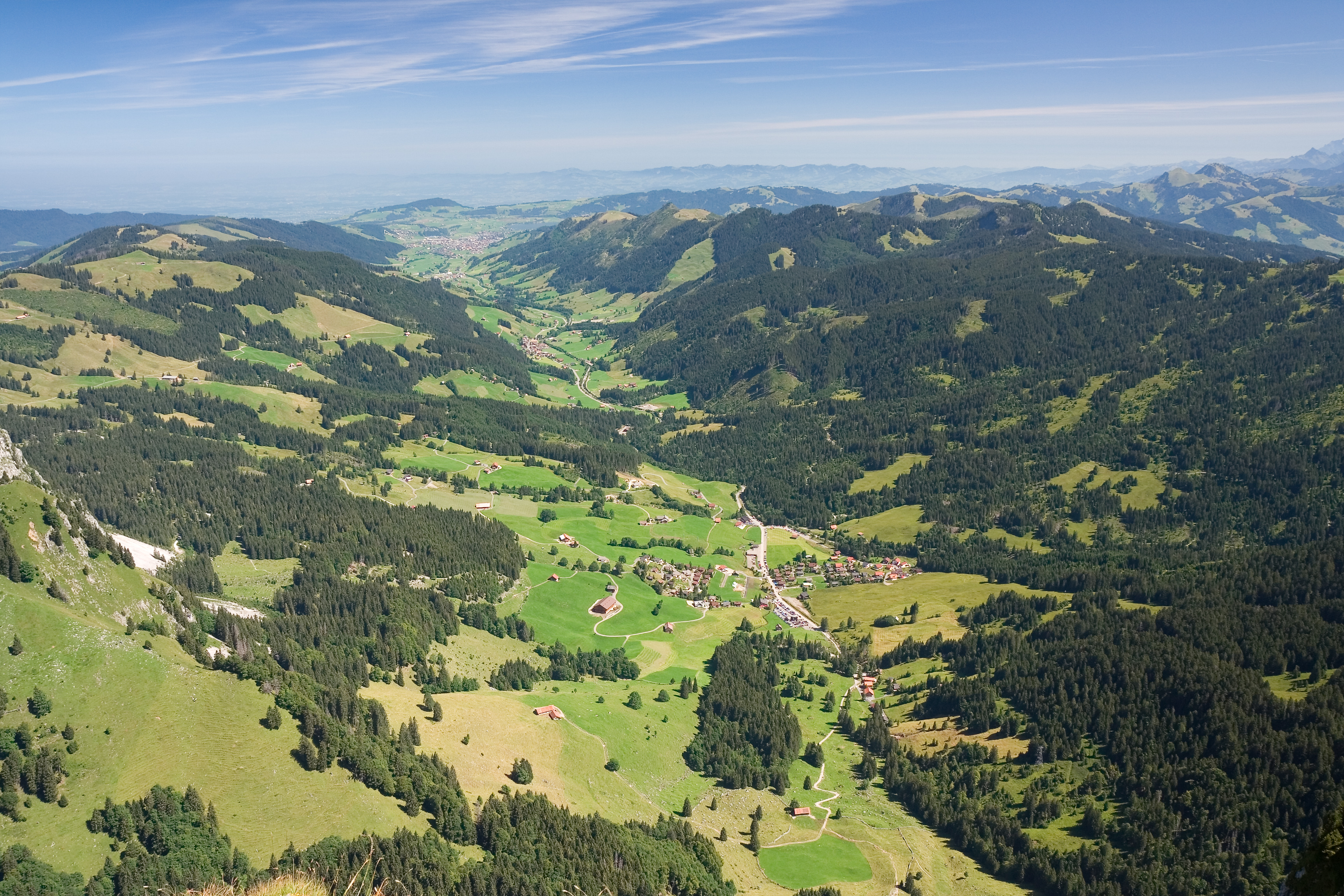
The river Alp flows through the Alptal, seen from the Grosser Mythen. The nearest settlement is Brunni, with Alpthal in the mid-distance. Then Trachslau, the larger town beyond is Einsiedeln.

Aerial view from 1000 m by Walter Mittelholzer (1923)

The village of Alpthal is located in the upper reaches of the Alptal, the valley of the river Alp upstream from Einsiedeln. Also within the municipality of Alpthal are the popular ski resort of Brunni, 3.3 km (2.1 mi) higher up the valley, and the settlement of Eigen, 2.1 km (1.3 mi) down the valley. To the north and beyond Eigen, the Alp flows through the village Trachslau and further through the town of Einsiedeln some 7 km (4.3 mi) beyond. To the west, south and east the municipality is surrounded by the peaks of the Nüsellstock, Näbikenfirst, Grossbrechenstock, Kleiner Mythen, Grosser Mythen, Rotenfluh, Furggelenstock and Gschwändstock. The Haggenegg, between the Kleiner Mythen and the Grossbrechenstock, and the Holzegg, between the Grosser Mythen and Rotenfluh, both cross towards Schwyz. Both Mythen and Hagenegg belong however to the municipality of Schwyz.

The municipality has an area, as of 2006, of 22.9 km^{2} (8.8 sq mi). Of this area, 32.4% is used for agricultural purposes, while 62.8% is forested. Of the rest of the land, 1.6% is settled (buildings or roads) and the remainder (3.2%) is non-productive (rivers, glaciers or mountains).

== Transport ==
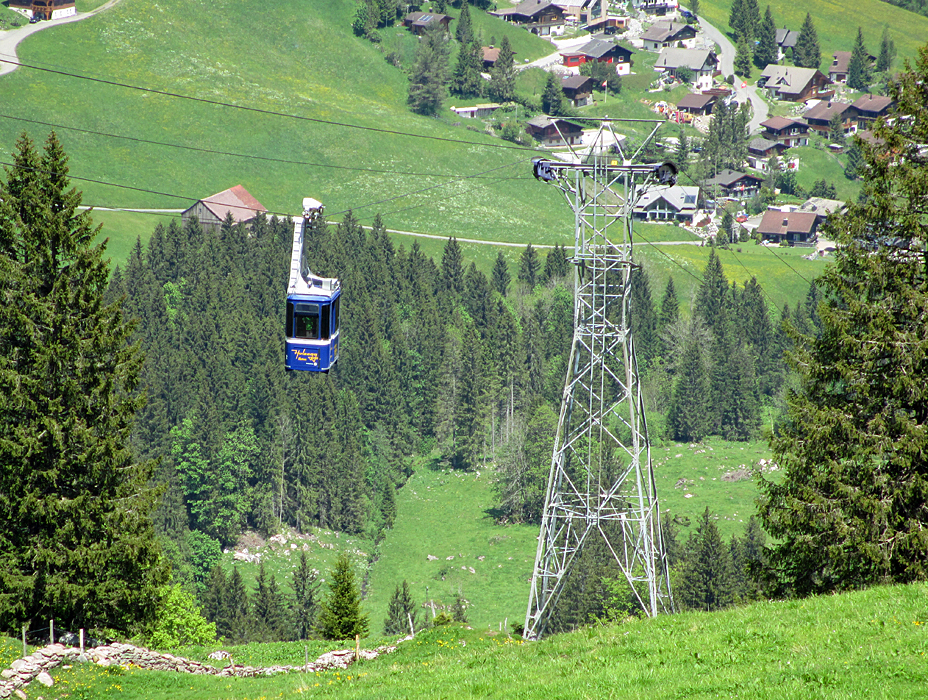
The Brunni to Holzegg cable car

The sole road access to the municipality is from the town of Einsiedeln in the form of a road following the Alp as far as Brunni. Hiking trails, only passable on foot in summer, cross both the Haggenegg and the Holzegg to the town of Schwyz. A cable car also links Brunni with the summit of the Holzegg, operating in both summer and winter.

PostBus Switzerland operates a near-hourly bus service from Einsiedeln railway station to Alpthal and Brunni. At Einsiedeln connection is made with Zurich S-Bahn services S13, to Wädenswil, and S40, to Rapperswil, with onward connections available to Zürich.

== Demographics ==
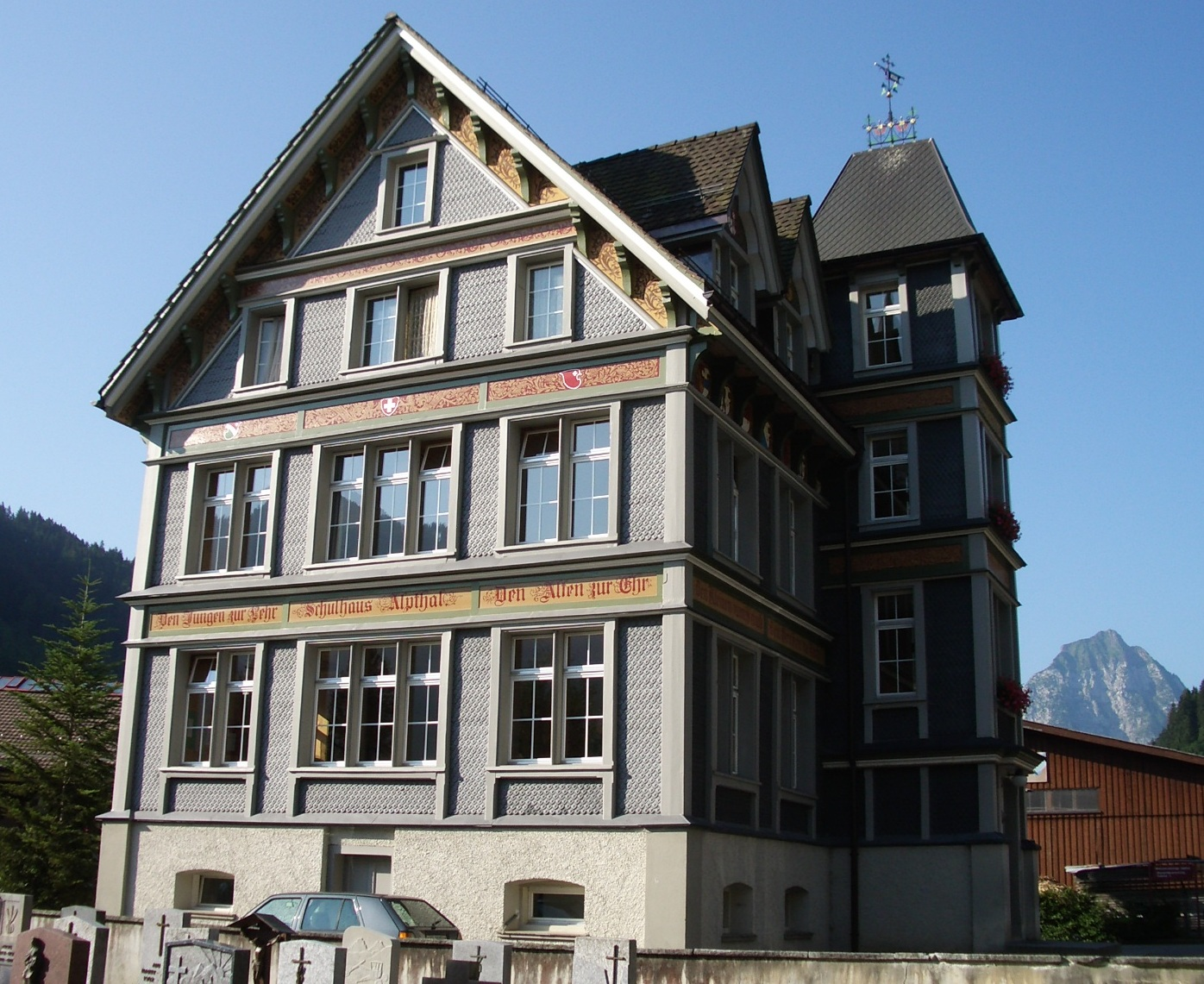
Building in Alpthal

Alpthal has a population (as of 31 December 2020) of 613. As of 2007, 4.9% of the population was made up of foreign nationals. Over the last 10 years the population has grown at a rate of 28%. Most of the population (as of 2000) speaks German (97.8%), with Albanian being second most common (1.8%) and Portuguese being third (0.4%).

As of 2000 the gender distribution of the population was 52.4% male and 47.6% female. The age distribution, as of 2008, in Alpthal is; 128 people or 28.8% of the population is between 0 and 19. 131 people or 29.4% are 20 to 39, and 106 people or 23.8% are 40 to 64. The senior population distribution is 51 people or 11.5% are 65 to 74. There are 25 people or 5.6% who are 70 to 79 and 4 people or 0.90% of the population who are over 80.

As of 2000 there are 172 households, of which 55 households (or about 32.0%) contain only a single individual. 15 or about 8.7% are large households, with at least five members. In the 2007 election the most popular party was the SVP which received 66.6% of the vote. The next three most popular parties were the CVP (17.2%), the FDP (9.4%) and the SPS (4.5%).

In Alpthal about 59.5% of the population (between age 25–64) have completed either non-mandatory upper secondary education or additional higher education (either university or a Fachhochschule).

Alpthal has an unemployment rate of 0.66%. As of 2005, there were 48 people employed in the primary economic sector and about 21 businesses involved in this sector. 14 people are employed in the secondary sector and there are 5 businesses in this sector. 46 people are employed in the tertiary sector, with 12 businesses in this sector.

From the 2000 census, 385 or 86.5% are Roman Catholic, while 34 or 7.6% belonged to the Swiss Reformed Church. There are 8 people (or about 1.80% of the population) who are Islamic. 10 (or about 2.25% of the population) belong to no church, are agnostic or atheist, and 8 individuals (or about 1.80% of the population) did not answer the question.

The historical population is given in the following table:

| Year | Population |
|---|---|
| 1850 | 390 |
| 1900 | 406 |
| 1950 | 312 |
| 1960 | 307 |
| 1970 | 325 |
| 1980 | 335 |
| 1990 | 369 |
| 2000 | 445 |
| 2005 | 511 |
| 2007 | 529 |

== Weather ==
Alpthal has an average of 161.9 days of rain per year and on average receives 2,096 mm (82.5 in) of precipitation. The wettest month is June during which time Alpthal receives an average of 249 mm (9.8 in) of precipitation. During this month there is precipitation for an average of 16.2 days. The driest month of the year is January with an average of 129 mm (5.1 in) of precipitation over 16.2 days.
