= Oath in Switzerland =

The oath (German: Eid; French: serment) was one of the legal and religious foundations of old European society, and in the territory of present-day Switzerland it played a central role in both judicial procedure and the constitution of communities and lordships. Linking word and gesture—often in the form of a conditional self-curse—it bound the legal order to the divine order. While the medieval Church and canon law distinguished between the assertory oath (an affirmation of truth) and the promissory oath (a solemn promise), the oath is regarded as a single institution; until the early modern period little distinction was made between a false oath and a breach of oath, both being punished as perjury (Latin periurium) by ecclesiastical and secular authorities.

Today the oath survives in Switzerland only in a much-reduced form. Following the 1874 ban on compelling religious acts, the Confederation and cantons introduced the solemn promise as an alternative to the oath. The unified codes of civil and criminal procedure that came into force in 2011 no longer mention the oath in national law, though the duty to testify remains a general civic obligation. The Confederation, some cantons, and communes still use the oath of office for elected officials and civil servants, as well as the military oath to the flag in active service, while a general civic oath sworn by all citizens survives only in the two Landsgemeinde cantons, Appenzell Innerrhoden and Glarus.

== Judicial oaths ==
In the late Roman Empire the oath was a central institution of civil and ecclesiastical court procedure. After the Christian Church abandoned its originally critical stance around 400, the oath took on a quasi-sacramental character. From the 6th to the 8th century it appears as the oath of purgation in all the Germanic tribal laws applied in the territory of present-day Switzerland: it allowed a defendant who contested his guilt to escape the further course of proceedings by affirming the truth of his statements, usually with the assistance of oath-helpers (compurgators), whose number depended on the gravity of the accusation and the defendant's social position. This form of oath persisted throughout the Middle Ages but gradually gave way to documentary and testimonial proof.

The oath was usually sworn at the court place and in strictly formal terms: the judge recited the formula with his staff raised, and the swearer repeated it word for word while performing certain gestures and touching objects or parts of the body. Under Christianization, one could swear only before God and the saints, on the Bible, the cross, or relics. Particular and usually humiliating provisions applied to Jews; the Schwabenspiegel and the law of Zürich, for example, required a Jew to stand on a pigskin while swearing. While the tribal laws provided no specific punishment for perjury, the Church treated it as a religious offense akin to blasphemy, subjected it to its own jurisdiction, and imposed ecclesiastical penalties; the Carolingian capitularies, the Schwabenspiegel, and many urban and rural ordinances threatened severe punishments, including cutting off the hand or the swearing fingers, or tearing out the tongue.

== Legal and political oaths ==
The countless private and political oaths of fealty attest to the immense importance of the oath in medieval society. It confirmed both unilateral promises and mutual obligations. From the 14th century, Alemannic legal sources increasingly used the Gelöbnis an Eides statt (a promise in lieu of an oath), a weakened form midway between the oath and the simple promise of fidelity, which facilitated legal transactions and served to curb the proliferation of oaths; its breach entailed only secular penalties, not religious damnation. The general subjects' oath—found especially among the Lombards, in the Merovingian kingdom, and again under Charlemagne—derived from the Germanic oath of allegiance; the oath was constitutive of lordship, and from the late Middle Ages its periodic renewal served to consolidate territorial rule.

In the Old Swiss Confederacy, bonds based on "horizontal" oaths among roughly equal partners were of the greatest importance, appearing above all in the form of sworn urban communes (Latin coniuratio, conspiratio). The burghers' oath, periodically renewed on a fixed swearing day (Schwörtag), formed the basis of the urban community and entailed a mutual obligation of peace and assistance and submission to the town's law and authorities. Other forms included the individual oath of new burghers, the tax oath that underpinned the levying of taxes, and innumerable oaths of office and of trade; from the 14th century, officials' oaths setting out their competencies were recorded in dedicated oath-books (Eidbücher). A special category in the late Middle Ages was the Urfehde (Latin iuramentum pacis), an oath used to end feuds. Rural sworn communes, which appeared early in the southern Alpine area (such as the oath of Torre in 1182) and in what is now central and eastern Switzerland, likewise rested on an oath-based commitment, as did the peace alliances among towns and rural communities.

== The contested oath in the early modern period ==
The oath was a central object in the early modern state's struggle for the monopoly of legitimate force, as it allowed the name of God and its coercive power to be claimed for secular purposes. The state first had to contend with the questioning of the oath by the Anabaptists, who in the Schleitheim Articles (1527) expressed their fundamental rejection of the promissory oath on the basis of a radical reading of the New Testament. This brought them into open conflict with the authorities and with the leading reformers—notably Huldrych Zwingli and John Calvin—who saw the refusal of the oath as a fundamental threat to social and political cohesion and held to the medieval doctrine of the oath as a religious act of central political and legal importance. The oath was used to forge a uniform body of subjects and took on a markedly confessional character, visible in the transformation of oaths of office into professions of faith.

The content of the oath and the obligation to swear thus became objects of dispute between the authorities and their subjects; unrest such as the peasant war of 1653 was triggered by the refusal to swear and the conclusion of unlawful sworn communes. Because the subjects' oath contributed to the sacralization of power, the authorities sought to curb the proliferation of other forms of oath and the accompanying "epidemic of perjury": from the 16th century, both Catholic and Protestant cantons issued ordinances limiting the oath to specific cases. Related to this was the emphasis, persisting well into the 18th century, on the sanctity of the oath through courtroom oath-tablets, lurid tales of the fate of perjurers, sermons, and devotional literature. Restrictions also reached the judicial sphere: criminal procedure retained only the witnesses' oath, while in civil procedure the oaths of parties and witnesses were kept but, as observed in Zürich, little used in practice.

== From the Enlightenment to the present ==
The institution of the oath was profoundly shaken in the 18th century. Natural-law thinking and the notion of contract led to grounding relations of power and business in reciprocal moral obligations, the advancing idea of toleration called the oath into question as a religiously based means of coercion, and Immanuel Kant finally declared the oath incompatible with human freedom. Around 1800 the Confederation became the scene of confrontations between defenders and critics of the traditional doctrine; most often what was demanded was not the complete abolition of the oath but its transformation into a "civic oath" founded on reason and a commitment to good faith. Following the French revolutionary model, the Helvetic Republic enshrined the obligation to swear the civic oath in its new constitution, with lavishly staged ceremonies marking the swearing day; in many rural areas there were collective refusals to swear the republican oath, motivated by attachment to traditional liberties. Under the Mediation the old subjects' oath was reactivated in many cantons, but the Regeneration finally removed its foundation.

The federal constitutional revision of 1874 prohibited compelling religious acts, after which the Confederation and the cantons introduced the solemn promise as an alternative to the oath. The oaths of parties and witnesses were gradually abolished in civil procedure, except in the cantons of Basel-Stadt, Fribourg, Glarus, Ticino, Valais, and Zug; the witnesses' oath was retained in criminal procedure at the federal level and in several cantons, notably Fribourg, Geneva, Neuchâtel, and Ticino.

The unified codes of civil and criminal procedure that came into force in 2011 no longer mention the oath in national law, and the duty to testify in criminal matters remains a general civic obligation. The penalties for oath-related offenses also changed: the Swiss Criminal Code (articles 306 and 307) punishes false statements and false testimony in court, with only a slightly increased penalty when the declarant has sworn an oath or given a solemn promise to tell the truth. The federal authorities, like some cantons and communes, still use the oath of office for elected officials and civil servants, as well as the oath to the flag in active military service. The general civic oath for all citizens survives only in the two Landsgemeinde cantons, Appenzell Innerrhoden and Glarus, and the supersession of the old European tradition of the oath continues to this day.

== Bibliography ==
- W. Ebel, Der Bürgereid, 1958
- E. Magnou-Nortier, Foi et fidélité, 1976
- L. Kolmer, Promissorische Eide im Mittelalter, 1989
- A. Holenstein, Die Huldigung der Untertanen, 1991
- P. Prodi, Il sacramento del potere, 1992 (German: Das Sakrament der Herrschaft, 1997)
- P. Blickle, ed., Der Fluch und der Eid, 1993

=== Sources ===
- Sammlung Schweizerischer Rechtsquellen (SSRQ)
