= Alp (river) =

River in the Swiss canton of Schwyz

Coordinates: 47.1667°N 8.7361°E

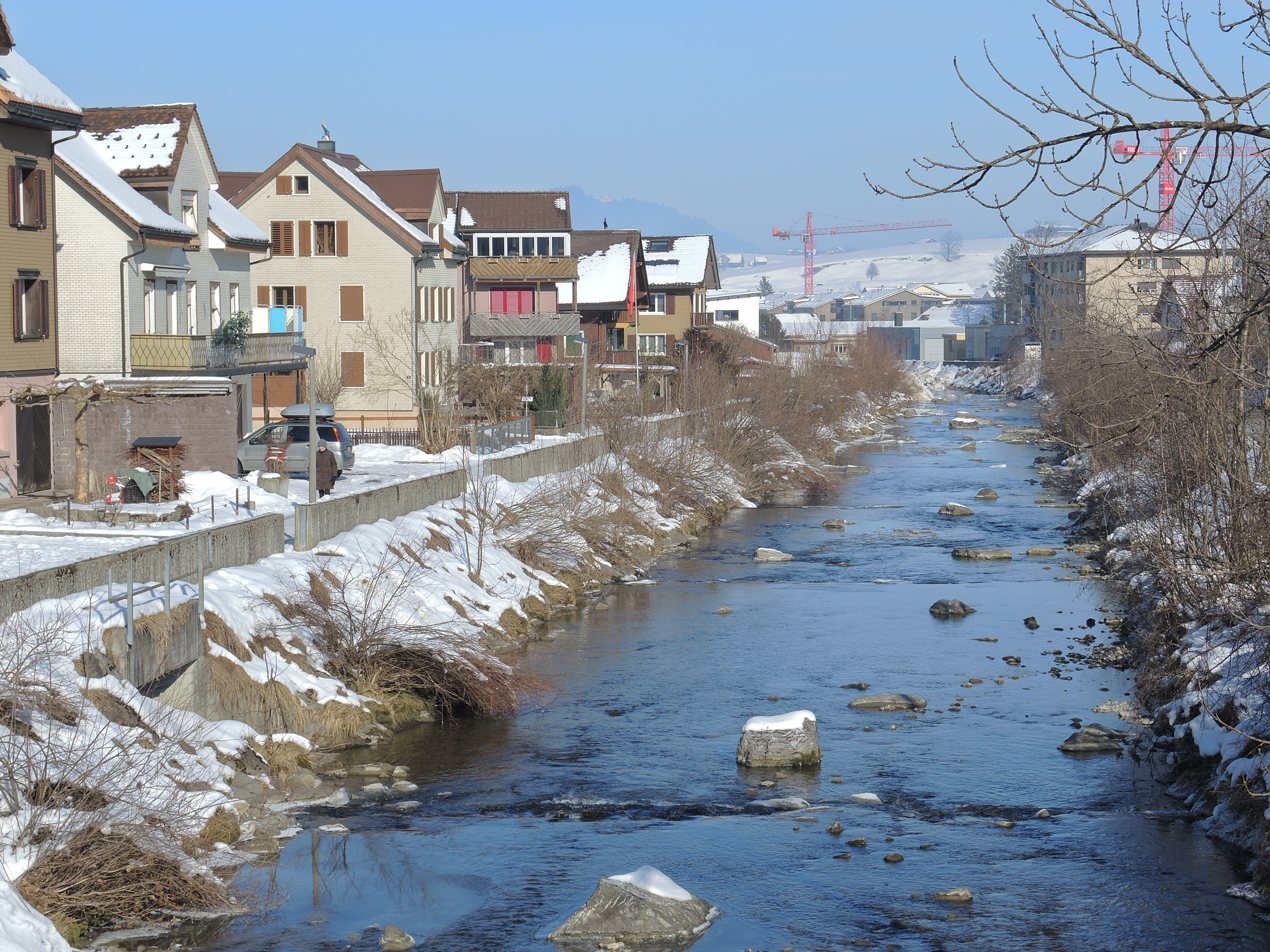
- The Alp in Einsiedeln

Location
- Country: Switzerland
- Canton: Schwyz

Physical characteristics
- Source
  - location: Brünnelistock and Grosser and Kleiner Mythen
  - elevation: 1,500 m (4,900 ft)
- Mouth
  - location: Dreiwässern, Sihl
  - elevation: 783 m (2,569 ft)
- Length: 19.3 km (12.0 mi)

Basin features
- Progression: Sihl→ Limmat→ Aare→ Rhine→ North Sea

The Alp is a river in the Swiss canton of Schwyz and a tributary of the Sihl. It has a length of 19.3 km (12.0 mi). The river rises on the northwestern flanks of the Brünnelistock and the northern flanks of the Kleiner and Grosser Mythen mountains near Brunni, and flows in generally northerly direction through the village of Alpthal, the village of Trachslau, the town of Einsiedeln and the village of Biberbrugg. At Biberbrugg, the river Biber joins the Alp. Some 2 km (1.2 mi) north of Biberbrugg, at Dreiwässern the Alp flows into the Sihl.

The valley between Brunni and Einsiedeln is called Alptal.

== See also ==
- List of rivers of Switzerland
