= Federal Diet =

Federal Diet may refer to:

- The Bundestag, the current legislative body in Germany
- The Federal Convention, the only central institution of the German Confederation from 1815 to 1848
- The Tagsatzung, the legislative and executive council of the Old Swiss Confederacy
