= Trachslau =

Village in Schwyz, Switzerland

- Municipality
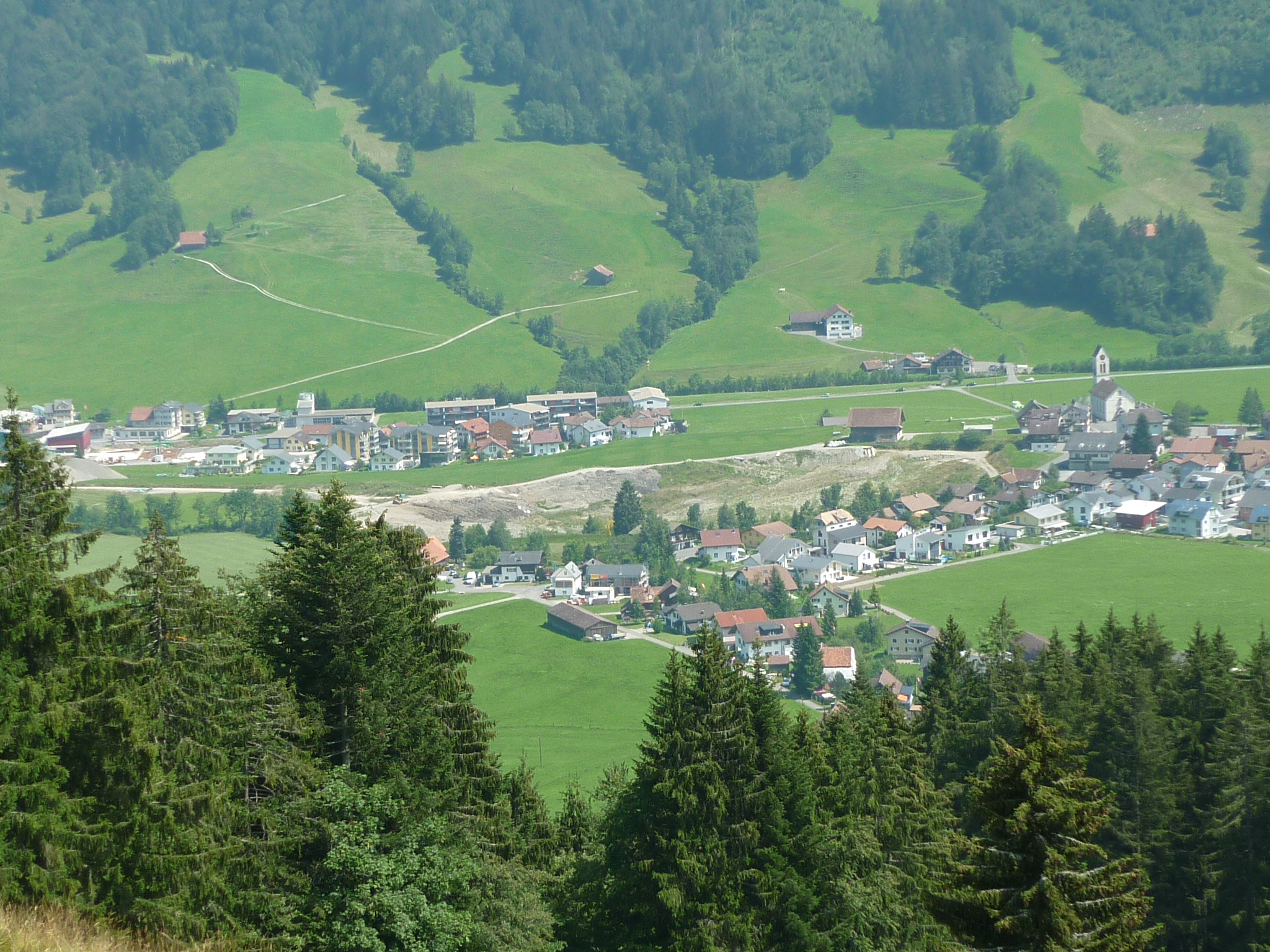
- Location of Trachslau
- Location within Switzerland Location within Canton of Schwyz
- Coordinates: 47°5′53.31″N 8°43′31.97″E
- Country: Switzerland
- Canton: Schwyz
- District: Einsiedeln
- Municipality: Einsiedeln
- Elevation: 950 m (3,120 ft)
- Time zone: UTC+01:00 (CET)
  - Summer (DST): UTC+02:00 (CEST)
- ISO 3166 code: CH-SZ
- Website: www.trachslau.ch

Trachslau is a village inside the municipality of Einsiedeln, in the Swiss canton of Schwyz. The village is in the flow of the Alp river. First documented in 1331 as Trechsellum.

Aerial view from 2000 m by Walter Mittelholzer (1928)

== Sources ==
- Die Kunstdenkmäler des Kantons Schwyz, Band I: Die Bezirke Einsiedeln, Höfe und March. (= Kunstdenkmäler der Schweiz. Band 1). Hrsg. von der Gesellschaft für Schweizerische Kunstgeschichte GSK. Bern 1927.
- Die Kunstdenkmäler des Kantons Schwitz. Neue Ausgabe III.II. Einsiedeln II. Dorf und Viertel Einsiedeln. Hrsg. von der Gesellschaft für Schweizerische Kunstgeschichte GSK. Bern 203, (Kunstdenkmäler der Schweiz Band 101). ISBN 3-906131-75-0.
