= Grosser Mythen =

Mountain in the Schwyzer Alps of Central Switzerland

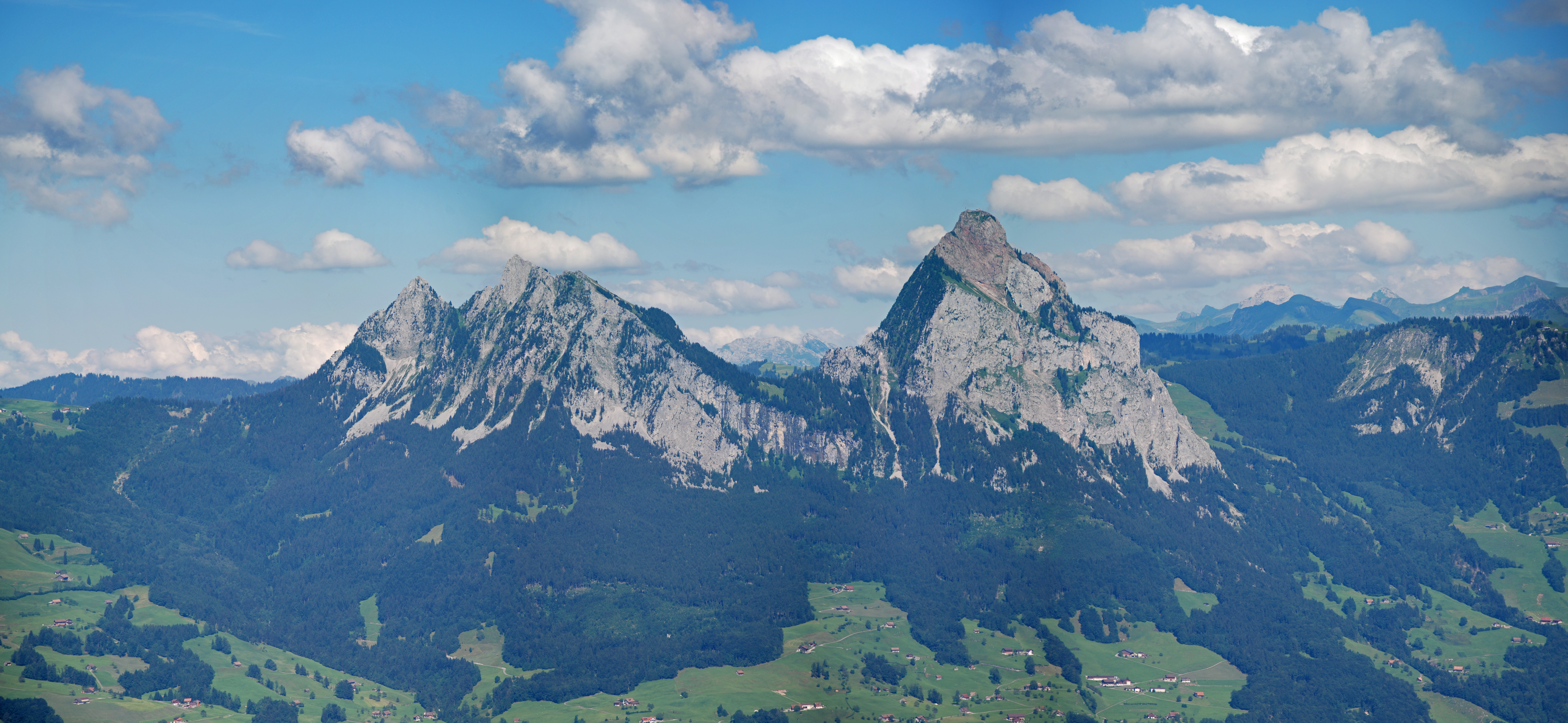
- Haggenspitz and Kleiner Mythen (left), and Grosser Mythen (right)

Highest point
- Elevation: 1,898 m (6,227 ft)
- Prominence: 493 m (1,617 ft)
- Coordinates: 47°01′47″N 8°41′19.7″E

Geography
- Location within Switzerland Location within Canton of Schwyz
- Country: Switzerland
- Canton: Schwyz
- Parent range: Schwyzer Alps

The Grosser Mythen (also Grosse Mythe, lit. 'Large Mythe[n]') is a mountain in the Schwyzer Alps of Central Switzerland. The mountain lies in the canton of Schwyz, to the east of the town of Schwyz, and to the south of the village of Alpthal in the valley of the river Alp. The Rotenfluh is located to the south of the Grosser Mythen.

It is accessible from the Holzegg by a hiking trail, which is opened during the summer months only.

Geologically the Mythen is a penninic Klippe.

== Name ==
The name is pronounced [ˈmiːtən]; it is in origin the plural referring to the Grosser and Kleiner Mythen collectively, each of which had the name Mythe (feminine) in the singular. The name is unrelated to the now-homographic German word for "myth"; Weibel (1973) derives it from Latin meta "cone, pyramid". Until the late 19th century, the name of the mountain was still feminine, die Grosse Mythe; after c. 1870, the masculine gender became increasingly common in written German although dialectically the feminine remains current.

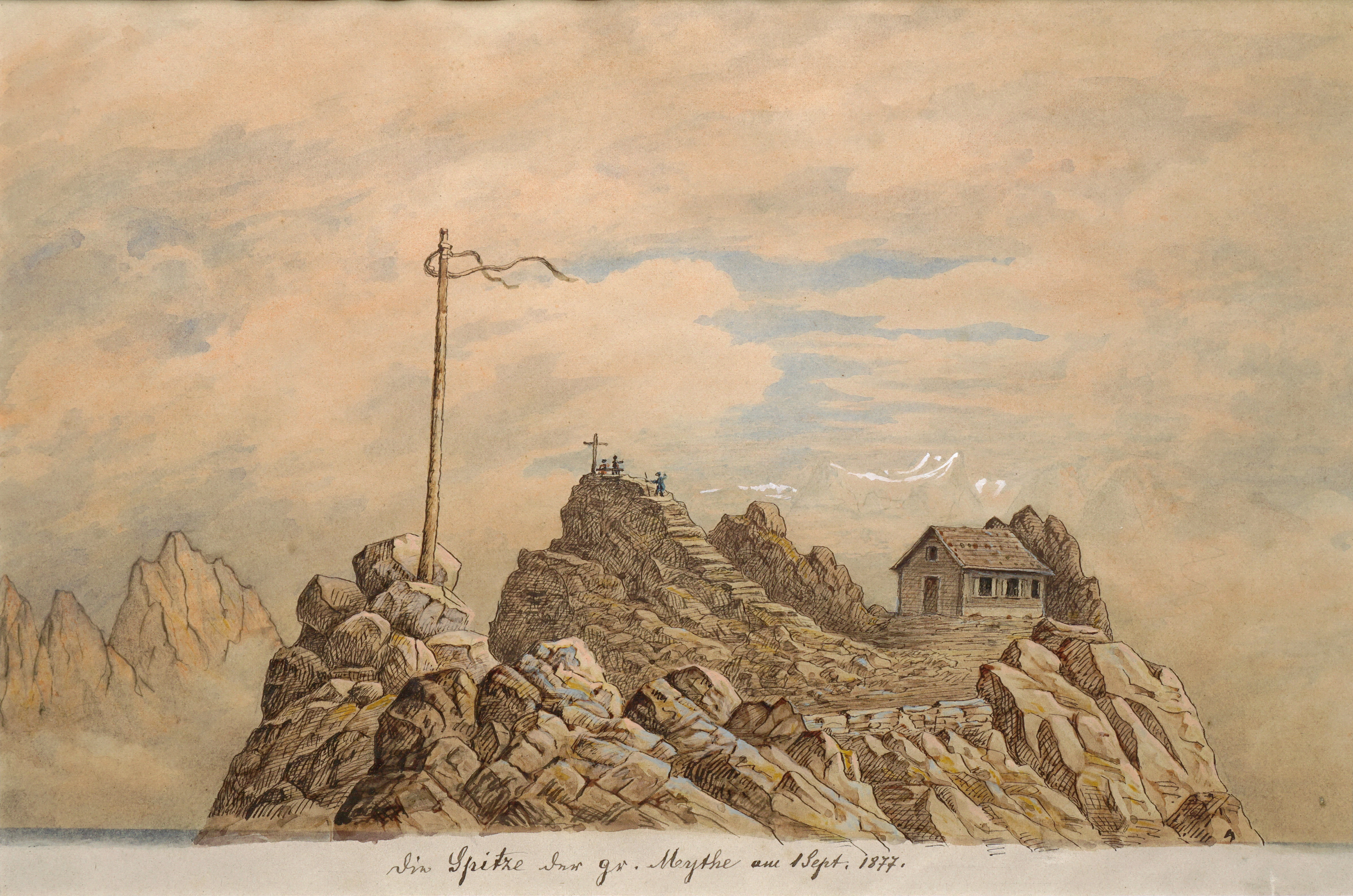
The Summit of 'Grosse Mythe', 1877. Watercolour by Heinrich Müller

== See also ==
- List of mountains of the canton of Schwyz
