= Senn (occupation) =

Chief cheesemaker on an Alpine pasture

The Senn (French: armailli) is the chief of a cheesemaking operation on an Alpine pasture in the German-speaking Alpine and Pre-Alpine regions of Europe. The term is used in Switzerland, Austria (especially Tyrol, Vorarlberg, and Salzburg), southern Germany (notably the Allgäu and Berchtesgaden regions of Bavaria), Liechtenstein, and South Tyrol in northern Italy. During the summer grazing period, the Senn directs the operation on the high pasture, processes the milk into cheese, butter, and other dairy products, and is responsible for the herd entrusted to him as well as the buildings, equipment, and upkeep of the pasture.

== Switzerland ==
During the summer grazing period from May to September or October, the Swiss Senn directs the cheesemaking operation with a small staff—an assistant (Untersenn or Zusenn, in French trancheur), a herdsboy (bouèbe in French), and others—though the number could reach a dozen on larger operations, including milkers and shepherds. Until the 20th century, only men were employed in the Alpine households north of the Alps. As a professional cheesemaker, the Senn is, together with his assistant, mainly responsible for processing the milk—producing cheese, Ziger, and butter—and for storing the cheeses, which are salted and then air-dried in a cellar.

=== Status and operation ===
The Senn is generally not the owner of the Alpine pasture but rather an employee or lessee of a municipality, an Alpine cooperative (Alpgenossenschaft or Alpkorporation), or a private individual. He is responsible for the cows entrusted to him by the members of the cooperative, for the buildings (the Sennhütte, the storage shed, and the stables), for the equipment (cheesemaking implements), and for the upkeep of the pasture. In autumn, if he is in the service of a cooperative, he hands his production over to the holders of Alpine rights for the Käseteilet, the division of the cheeses in proportion to each member's share. If he leases the pasture, he works for his own account: he buys the milk produced on the pasture and pays the rent in autumn or on New Year's Day. With renewable leases, tenancies could last a lifetime or even several generations, as in the Emmental and the Jura.

In German-speaking Switzerland, the terms Sennerei, Sente, and Senntum denote the cheesemaking operation of an Alpine pasture together with its herd, whose size could be unfixed (for example 20 to 40 head) or fixed by custom, as in Appenzell (24 cows and one bull). Farmers who own a farm in the valley and run an Alpine pasture with their own livestock alongside it are called Sentenbauern.

=== Medieval and early modern development ===
Cheesemaking was already a branch of seigneurial economy in the Middle Ages, both on the Alpine pastures and in the valleys (Schweighöfe), with the cheesemakers initially being serfs. The Senn began to operate independently as a salaried cheesemaker or tenant (Lehensenn) from the 15th century onward, when fat cheeses began to be exported successfully. From the 17th century onward, Senn-cheesemakers from the Emmental to the Gruyère gradually became true cheesemaking entrepreneurs, known in Bernese German as Küher. From the 18th century, Fribourg-born armaillis settled on the pastures of the Vaud and Neuchâtel Jura.

=== Modern decline and revival ===
When Alpine cheesemaking began to decline after 1830, the Senn found new employment in the valleys as salaried cheesemakers or tenants of valley dairies, chiefly in the cantons of Bern, Lucerne, Solothurn, and Aargau, and from 1860 onward in eastern Switzerland. Some of the Alpine pastures that had continued to produce cheese ceased to do so after 1950 owing to a lack of labor, before being taken up again from 1970 by young city-dwellers, many of them women. These "new Senn" train as cheesemakers at agricultural schools.

=== Culture and folklore ===
The idealization of pastoral life in the Alpine-themed literature of the 18th and 19th centuries, together with the prosperity of the Senn—especially the independent ones—reinforced their professional pride and gave rise to several customs linked to their work: festive Alpine ascents (Alpaufzug), depictions of Alpine life (Senntumsdarstellungen), the Gruyère poya paintings, music such as the Ranz des Vaches, and festivities at midsummer or on Saint Mary Magdalene's day. Senn confraternities also developed in Central Switzerland. A rich Senn culture, part of the wider Alpine herdsmen's culture, developed in the Pre-Alps and survives in the traditional costumes of the cheesemakers of Appenzell, Toggenburg, the Emmental, and the Gruyère, in spite of—or because of—the commercialization of folklore for tourism.

Since the 1940s, folklore studies and ethnology have contributed significantly to the study of Alpine herdsmen's culture (songs, customs, and legends) as well as the working environment and daily life of the "new Senn".

== Bibliography ==
- R. Weiss, Das Alpwesen Graubündens, vol. 1, 1941 (reprint 1992).
- R. J. Ramseyer, Das altbernische Küherwesen, 1961 (2nd ed. 1991).
- Vocabolario dei dialetti della Svizzera italiana, vol. 1, 1965, pp. 90–120.
- R. Ruffieux, W. Bodmer, Histoire du Gruyère du XVIe au XXe siècle, 1972.
- P. Hugger, Le Jura vaudois, 1975 (German original 1972).
- C. Quartier, Le Pays-d'Enhaut, 1980. * R. Kruker, H. Mäder, Hirten und Herden, 1983.
- R. Kruker, "La société et la culture alpines", in Les Suisses, ed. P. Hugger, vol. 3, 1992, pp. 1003–1037.

== See also ==
- Alpine transhumance
- Alpine cheese
- Gruyère (cheese)
- Emmental cheese
