= Markgenossenschaft =

Historiographical concept of medieval rural commons

Markgenossenschaft is a concept developed by nineteenth-century legal historians to describe what they took to be communities of free peasants in early Germanic societies who jointly exploited the land. The term was coined from marchenoten ("those entitled to use the mark"), which appears in sources from Westphalia around 1200, alongside the variants Marcgenoten and Markgenossen. The construct was shaped by Romantic ideas about the origins of Germanic society, but its existence as a primitive institution is no longer accepted by modern scholarship.

== Historiography ==
In the older view, private cultivation of the fertile lands closest to the village gradually established itself during the Middle Ages, confining the communal property to the marginal areas of the territory—the mark. The regulations attested from the thirteenth century onward were read as the expression of conflicts over what remained of the Markgenossenschaften, defended against competitors that could also include ecclesiastical or noble lordships. This interpretation persisted well into the twentieth century, including in research on central Switzerland.

Since the 1950s, economic and social history has taken the opposite view: land use was individual before it was communal. Only in the High Middle Ages did demographic growth, the introduction of the three-field system, and land clearances make it necessary to regulate boundaries and paths, and to agree on rights of use and on communal tasks in peripheral areas such as alpine chalets and embankments. The Markgenossenschaften are therefore now regarded as a heterogeneous phenomenon of the high and late Middle Ages rather than a primitive institution.

== Open questions ==
No comprehensive study of the origin of the Markgenossenschaften yet exists. It is not even settled whether the term should be understood narrowly, as a grouping of the village communities of a single valley, or broadly, as any group of users entitled to draw on the common land.

There has also been no fundamental discussion of the one-sided character of the sources used—primarily normative texts drawn up in the late Middle Ages—which may distort our perception of the phenomenon. A further open question is whether, by the end of the Middle Ages, communal agreements served the interests of a few privileged commoners rather than the common good.

== Bibliography ==
- K. S. Bader, Dorfgenossenschaft und Dorfgemeinde, 1962.
- Handwörterbuch zur deutschen Rechtsgeschichte, 3, 302–330.
- Lexikon des Mittelalters, 6, 298–330.
