= Hasli =

Hasli is a Swiss toponym. It may refer to:

- the Oberhasli region in the Bernese Oberland
- a village in Muri, AG
- Niederhasli
