= Unteriberg =

- Municipality
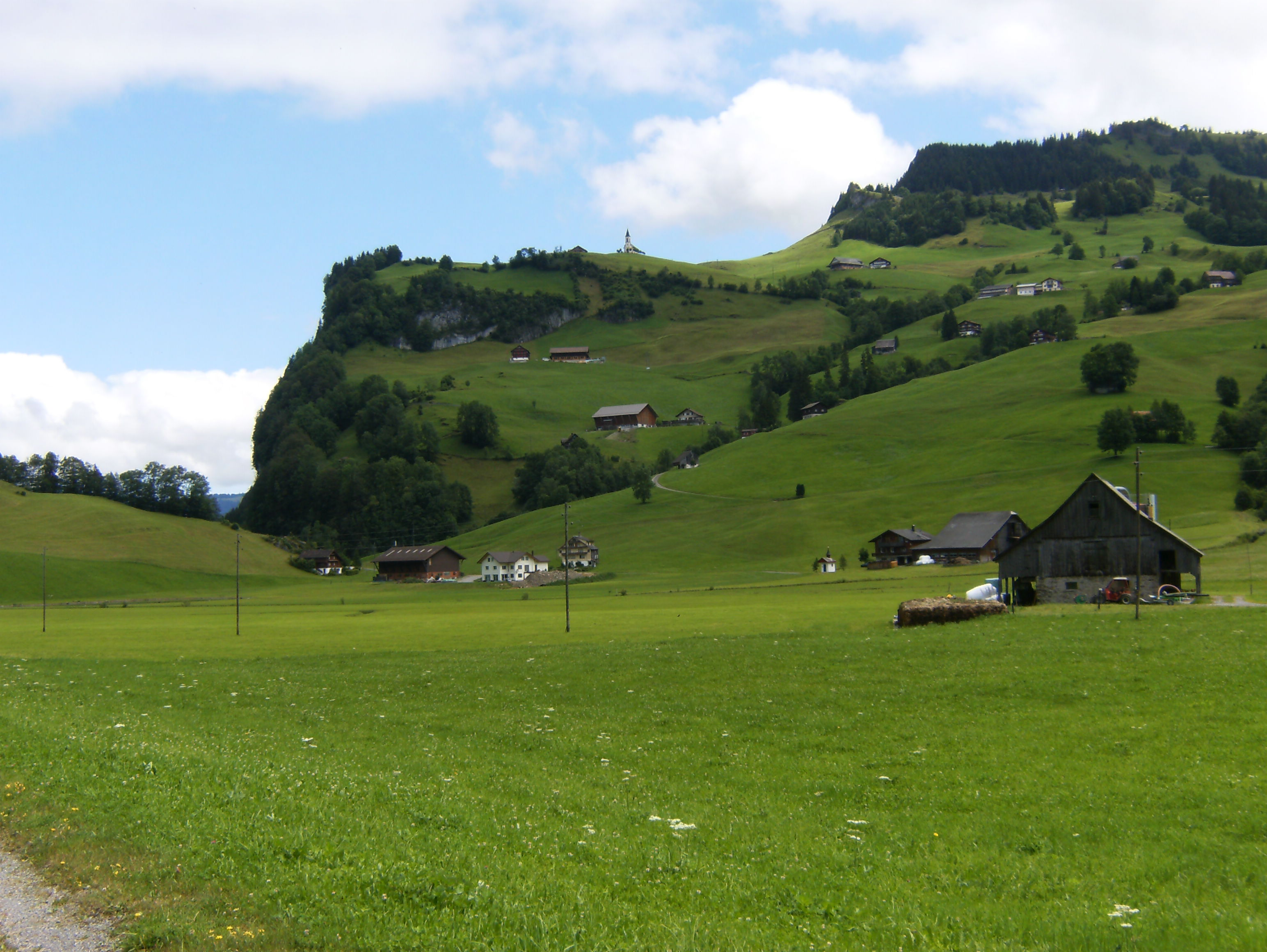

- Coat of arms
- Location of Unteriberg
- Location within Switzerland Location within Canton of Schwyz
- Coordinates: 47°4′N 8°48′E
- Country: Switzerland
- Canton: Schwyz
- District: Schwyz

Area
  - Total: 46.7 km^{2} (18.0 sq mi)
- Elevation: 925 m (3,035 ft)

Population (December 2020)
  - Total: 2,414
  - Density: 51.7/km^{2} (134/sq mi)
- Time zone: UTC+01:00 (CET)
  - Summer (DST): UTC+02:00 (CEST)
- Postal code: 8842
- SFOS number: 1375
- ISO 3166 code: CH-SZ
- Surrounded by: Einsiedeln, Innerthal, Muotathal, Oberiberg
- Website: www.unteriberg.ch

Unteriberg is a village and municipality in Schwyz District in the canton of Schwyz in Switzerland. Besides the village of Unteriberg, the municipality includes the villages of Studen, Waag, Stöcken and Herti.

== History ==
Unteriberg is first mentioned around 1217–22 as Yberge. Until the separation, in 1884, into Unteriberg and Oberiberg the independent municipality was known simply as Iberg.

Unteriberg is the hometown of noted ski racer Wendy Holdener.

== Geography ==
The municipality of Unteriberg lies in the valleys of the Sihl, Waag and Minster rivers, at the southern end of the artificial Sihlsee. The villages of Unteriberg, Stöcken and Herti all lie on the Minster river close to its confluence with the Waag. The village of Waag is on its namesake river, whilst Studen is on the Sihl. To the south of the municipality is the mountain of Druesberg, whose northern slopes are shared between Unteriberg and the neighbouring municipality of Oberiberg. To the east is the Fluebrig mountain.

The municipality has an area, as of 2006, of 46.7 km^{2} (18.0 sq mi). Of this area, 44.4% is used for agricultural purposes, while 35.1% is forested. Of the rest of the land, 2.9% is settled (buildings or roads) and the remainder (17.6%) is non-productive (rivers, glaciers or mountains).

== Demographics ==
Unteriberg has a population (as of 31 December 2020) of 2,414. As of 2007, 5.4% of the population was made up of foreign nationals. Over the last 10 years the population has grown at a rate of 4.7%. Most of the population (as of 2000) speaks German (98.2%), with Portuguese being second most common ( 0.4%) and Albanian being third ( 0.3%).

As of 2000 the gender distribution of the population was 50.6% male and 49.4% female. The age distribution, as of 2008, in Unteriberg is; 708 people or 31.9% of the population is between 0 and 19. 638 people or 28.7% are 20 to 39, and 628 people or 28.3% are 40 to 64. The senior population distribution is 151 people or 6.8% are 65 to 74. There are 72 people or 3.2% who are 70 to 79 and 23 people or 1.04% of the population who are over 80.

As of 2000 there are 802 households, of which 194 households (or about 24.2%) contain only a single individual. 75 or about 9.4% are large households, with at least five members.

In the 2007 election the most popular party was the SVP which received 76% of the vote. The next three most popular parties were the CVP (10.1%), the FDP (6.8%) and the SPS (5%).

In Unteriberg about 55.9% of the population (between age 25–64) have completed either non-mandatory upper secondary education or additional higher education (either university or a Fachhochschule).

Unteriberg has an unemployment rate of 1.18%. As of 2005, there were 133 people employed in the primary economic sector and about 57 businesses involved in this sector. 229 people are employed in the secondary sector and there are 38 businesses in this sector. 284 people are employed in the tertiary sector, with 75 businesses in this sector.

From the 2000 census, 1,880 or 84.7% are Roman Catholic, while 189 or 8.5% belonged to the Swiss Reformed Church. Of the rest of the population, there are 10 individuals (or about 0.45% of the population) who belong to the Orthodox Church. There are 21 (or about 0.95% of the population) who are Islamic. 70 (or about 3.15% of the population) belong to no church, are agnostic or atheist, and 50 individuals (or about 2.25% of the population) did not answer the question.

The historical population is given in the following table:

year	population
1950	1,213
1960	1,251
1970	1,344
1980	1,504
1985	1,563
1990	1,821
2000	2,200
2005	2,289
2007	2,325
