= Oberiberg =

- Municipality
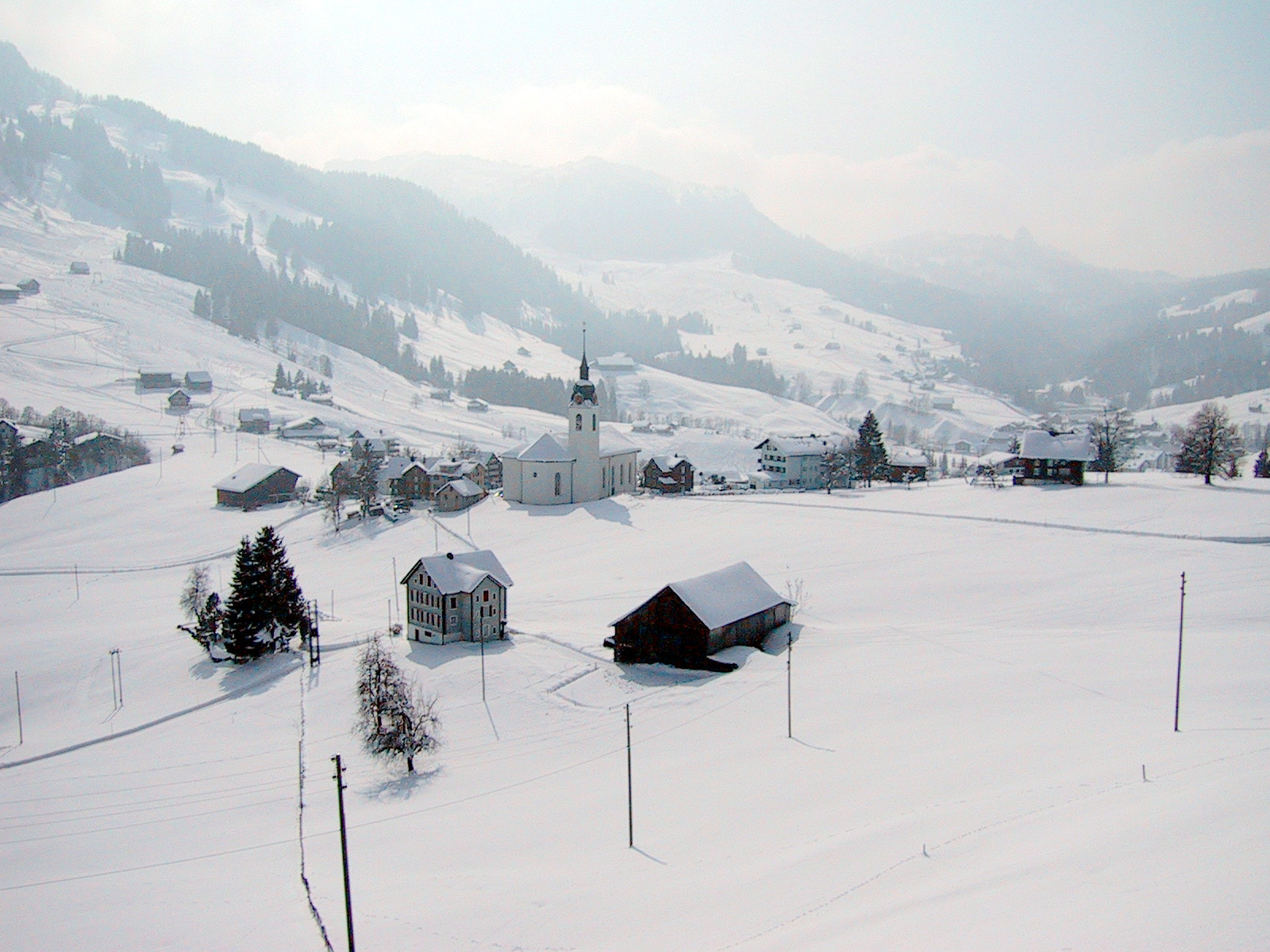

- Coat of arms
- Location of Oberiberg
- Location within Switzerland Location within Canton of Schwyz
- Coordinates: 47°02′20″N 8°46′51″E
- Country: Switzerland
- Canton: Schwyz
- District: Schwyz

Area
  - Total: 32.9 km^{2} (12.7 sq mi)
- Elevation: 1,130 m (3,710 ft)

Population (December 2020)
  - Total: 878
  - Density: 26.7/km^{2} (69.1/sq mi)
- Time zone: UTC+01:00 (CET)
  - Summer (DST): UTC+02:00 (CEST)
- Postal code: 8843
- SFOS number: 1368
- ISO 3166 code: CH-SZ
- Surrounded by: Alpthal, Einsiedeln, Illgau, Muotathal, Schwyz, Unteriberg
- Website: www.oberiberg.ch

Oberiberg is a village and municipality in Schwyz District in the canton of Schwyz in Switzerland. The municipality comprises the village of Oberiberg and the hamlet and ski area of Hoch-Ybrig.

== History ==
Oberiberg is first mentioned around 1217-22 as Yberge. Until the separation, in 1884, into Unteriberg and Oberiberg the independent municipality was known simply as Iberg.

== Geography ==
Aerial view (1958)

Oberiberg has an area, as of 2006, of 32.8 km^{2} (12.7 sq mi). Of this area, 50.2% is used for agricultural purposes, while 39.1% is forested. Of the rest of the land, 1.9% is settled (buildings or roads) and the remainder (8.8%) is non-productive (rivers, glaciers or mountains).

It consists of the village of Oberiberg and the hamlet of Hoch-Ybrig.

== Demographics ==
Oberiberg has a population (as of 31 December 2020) of 878. As of 2007, 7.1% of the population was made up of foreign nationals. Over the last 10 years the population has grown at a rate of 4.7%. Most of the population (as of 2000) speaks German (98.2%), with Portuguese being second most common ( 0.4%) and Albanian being third ( 0.3%).

As of 2000 the gender distribution of the population was 51.7% male and 48.3% female. The age distribution, as of 2008, in Oberiberg is; 150 people or 20.9% of the population is between 0 and 19. 189 people or 26.3% are 20 to 39, and 260 people or 36.2% are 40 to 64. The senior population distribution is 61 people or 8.5% are 65 to 74. There are 54 people or 7.5% who are 70 to 79 and 4 people or 0.56% of the population who are over 80.

As of 2000 there are 296 households, of which 89 households (or about 30.1%) contain only a single individual. 22 or about 7.4% are large households, with at least five members.

In the 2007 election the most popular party was the SVP which received 62.1% of the vote. The next three most popular parties were the CVP (19.1%), the SPS (8.6%) and the FDP (7.2%).

In Oberiberg about 56.6% of the population (between age 25-64) have completed either non-mandatory upper secondary education or additional higher education (either university or a Fachhochschule).

Oberiberg has an unemployment rate of 0.8%. As of 2005, there were 98 people employed in the primary economic sector and about 41 businesses involved in this sector. 41 people are employed in the secondary sector and there are 11 businesses in this sector. 134 people are employed in the tertiary sector, with 49 businesses in this sector.

From the 2000 census, 557 or 77.6% are Roman Catholic, while 95 or 13.2% belonged to the Swiss Reformed Church. Of the rest of the population, there are 5 individuals (or about 0.70% of the population) who belong to the Orthodox Church. There are less than 5 individuals who are Islamic. 33 (or about 4.60% of the population) belong to no church, are agnostic or atheist, and 24 individuals (or about 3.34% of the population) did not answer the question.

The historical population is given in the following table:

year	population
1888	667
1900	690
1950	530
1970	552
1980	600
1985	597
1990	655
2000	710
2005	771
2007	793

== Weather ==
Oberiberg has an average of 163.6 days of rain per year and on average receives 1,952 mm (76.9 in) of precipitation. The wettest month is July during which time Oberiberg receives an average of 237 mm (9.3 in) of precipitation. During this month there is precipitation for an average of 15.4 days. The month with the most days of precipitation is June, with an average of 16.5, but with only 230 mm (9.1 in) of precipitation. The driest month of the year is October with an average of 115 mm (4.5 in) of precipitation over 15.4 days.
