= Walchwil Hörndli railway station =

Railway station in Switzerland

Walchwil Hörndli
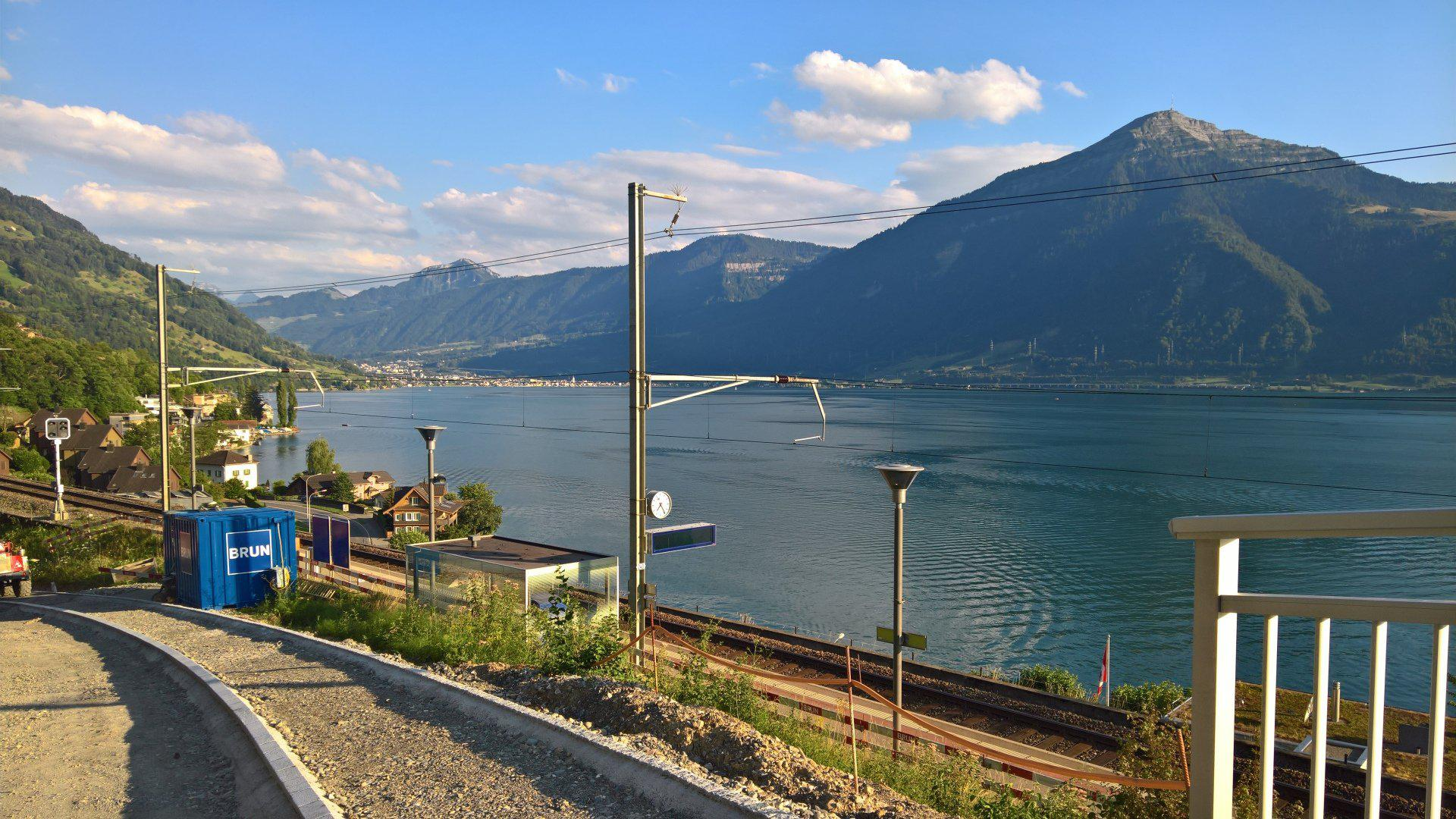
- The station in 2018

General information
- Location: Walchwil, Zug; Switzerland
- Coordinates: 47°06′30″N 8°30′17″E
- Elevation: 438 m (1,437 ft)
- Owner: Swiss Federal Railways
- Line: Thalwil–Arth-Goldau line
- Distance: 8.0 km (5.0 mi) from Zug
- Train operators: Swiss Federal Railways
- Connections: Zugerland Verkehrsbetriebe bus lines

Other information
- Fare zone: 625 (Tarifverbund Zug)

Passengers
- 2018: 50 per weekday

Services
Preceding station	Zug Stadtbahn	Following station
Zug Oberwil towards Baar Lindenpark	S2	Walchwil towards Erstfeld
Location

Walchwil Hörndli railway station (German: Bahnhof Walchwil Hörndli) is a railway station in the municipality of Walchwil, in the Swiss canton of Zug. It is an intermediate stop on the standard gauge Thalwil–Arth-Goldau line of Swiss Federal Railways.

== Services ==
As of the December 2020 timetable change, the following services stop at Walchwil Hörndli:

- Zug Stadtbahn S2: hourly service between Baar Lindenpark and Erstfeld.
