= Zug Casino railway station =

Railway station in Switzerland

Zug Casino
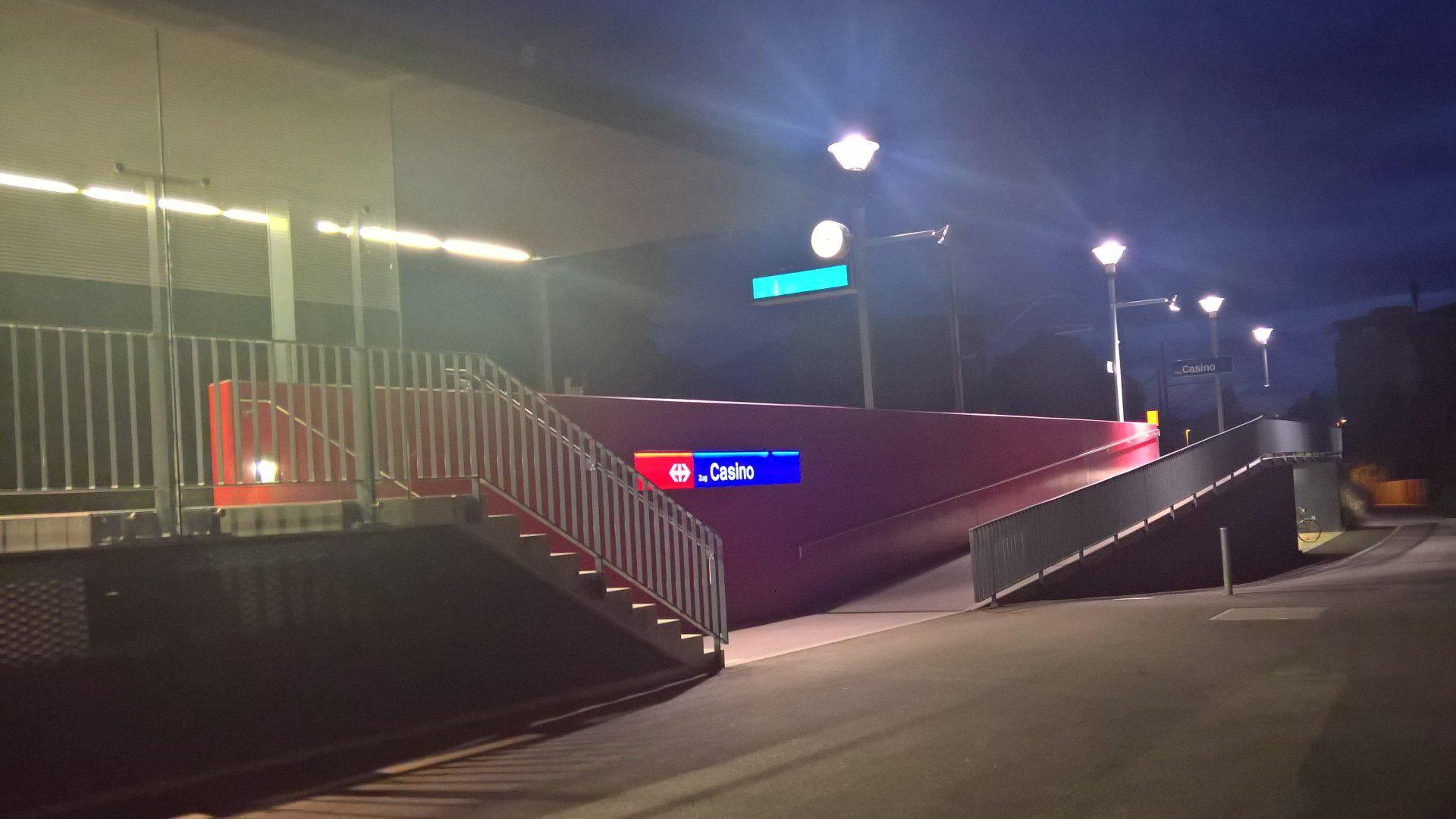
- The station platform in 2018

General information
- Location: Zug; Switzerland
- Coordinates: 47°09′44″N 8°30′55″E
- Elevation: 432 m (1,417 ft)
- Owner: Swiss Federal Railways
- Line: Thalwil–Arth-Goldau line
- Distance: 1.4 km (0.87 mi) from Zug
- Train operators: Swiss Federal Railways
- Connections: Zugerland Verkehrsbetriebe bus lines

Other information
- Fare zone: 610 (Tarifverbund Zug)

Passengers
- 2018: 200 per weekday

Services
Preceding station	Zug Stadtbahn	Following station
Zug Postplatz towards Baar Lindenpark	S2	Zug Fridbach towards Erstfeld
Location

Zug Casino railway station (German: Bahnhof Zug Casino) is a railway station in the municipality of Zug, in the Swiss canton of Zug. It is an intermediate stop on the standard gauge Thalwil–Arth-Goldau line of Swiss Federal Railways.

== Services ==
As of the December 2020 timetable change, the following services stop at Zug Casino:

- Zug Stadtbahn S2: hourly service between Baar Lindenpark and Erstfeld.
