= Zug Fridbach railway station =

Railway station in Switzerland

Zug Fridbach
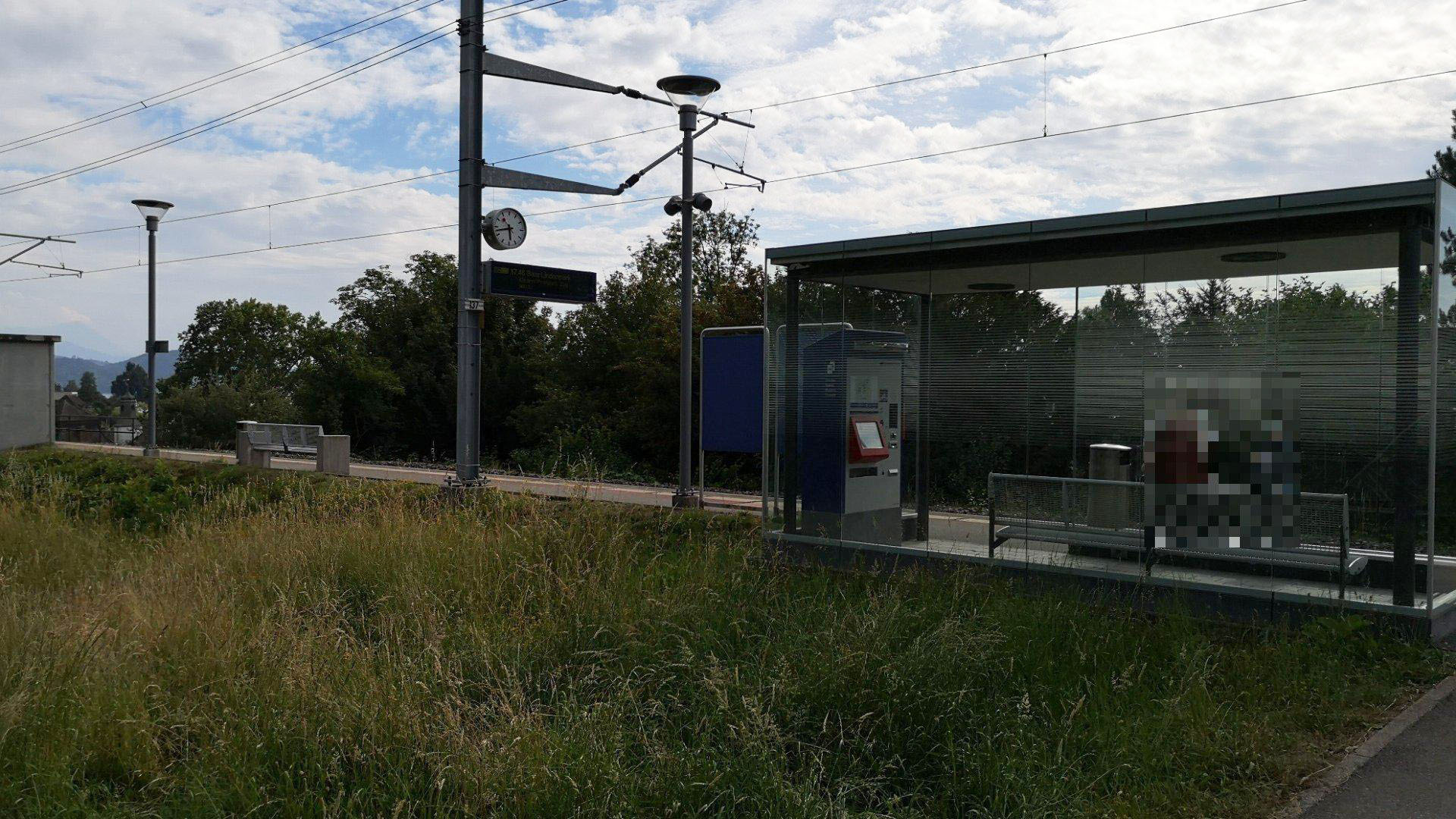
- The station platform in 2018

General information
- Location: Zug; Switzerland
- Coordinates: 47°09′24″N 8°30′44″E
- Elevation: 432 m (1,417 ft)
- Owner: Swiss Federal Railways
- Line: Thalwil–Arth-Goldau line
- Distance: 2.1 km (1.3 mi) from Zug
- Train operators: Swiss Federal Railways
- Connections: Zugerland Verkehrsbetriebe bus lines

Other information
- Fare zone: 610 (Tarifverbund Zug)

Passengers
- 2018: 320 per weekday

Services
Preceding station	Zug Stadtbahn	Following station
Zug Casino towards Baar Lindenpark	S2	Zug Oberwil towards Erstfeld
Location

Zug Fridbach railway station (German: Bahnhof Zug Fridbach) is a railway station in the municipality of Zug, in the Swiss canton of Zug. It is an intermediate stop on the standard gauge Thalwil–Arth-Goldau line of Swiss Federal Railways.

== Services ==
As of the December 2020 timetable change, the following services stop at Zug Fridbach:

- Zug Stadtbahn S2: hourly service between Baar Lindenpark and Erstfeld.
