= Walchwil railway station =

Railway station in Switzerland

Walchwil
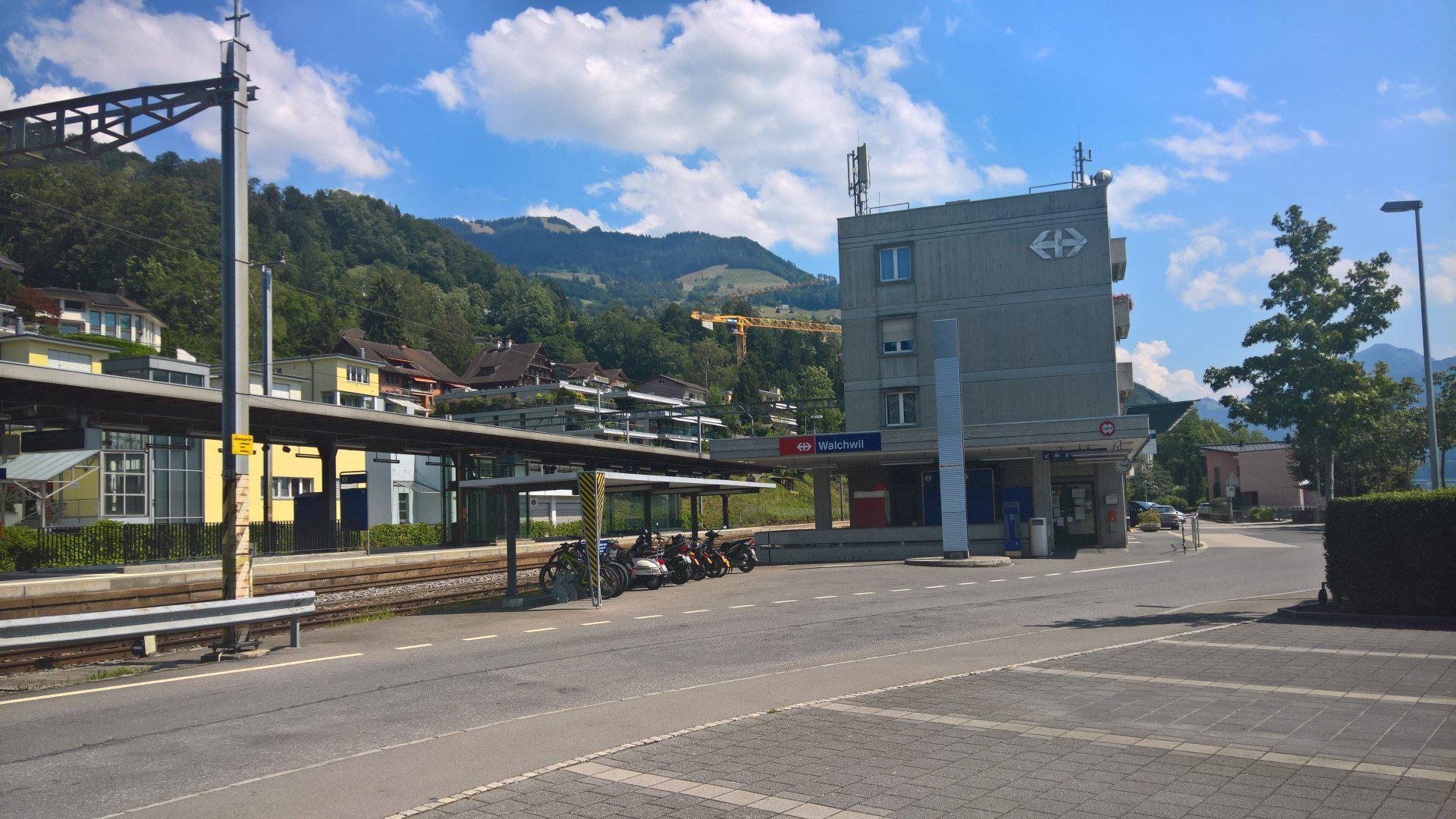
- The station in 2018

General information
- Location: Walchwil, Zug; Switzerland
- Coordinates: 47°05′55″N 8°31′01″E
- Elevation: 449 m (1,473 ft)
- Owner: Swiss Federal Railways
- Line: Thalwil–Arth-Goldau line
- Distance: 9.5 km (5.9 mi) from Zug
- Train operators: Swiss Federal Railways
- Connections: Zugerland Verkehrsbetriebe bus lines

Other information
- Fare zone: 625 (Tarifverbund Zug)

Passengers
- 2018: 630 per weekday

Services
Preceding station	Zug Stadtbahn	Following station
Walchwil Hörndli towards Baar Lindenpark	S2	Arth-Goldau towards Erstfeld
Location

Walchwil railway station (German: Bahnhof Walchwil) is a railway station in the municipality of Walchwil, in the Swiss canton of Zug. It is an intermediate stop on the standard gauge Thalwil–Arth-Goldau line of Swiss Federal Railways.

== Services ==
As of the December 2020 timetable change, the following services stop at Walchwil:

- Zug Stadtbahn S2: hourly service between Baar Lindenpark and Erstfeld.
