= Zug Postplatz railway station =

Swiss railway station

Zug Postplatz
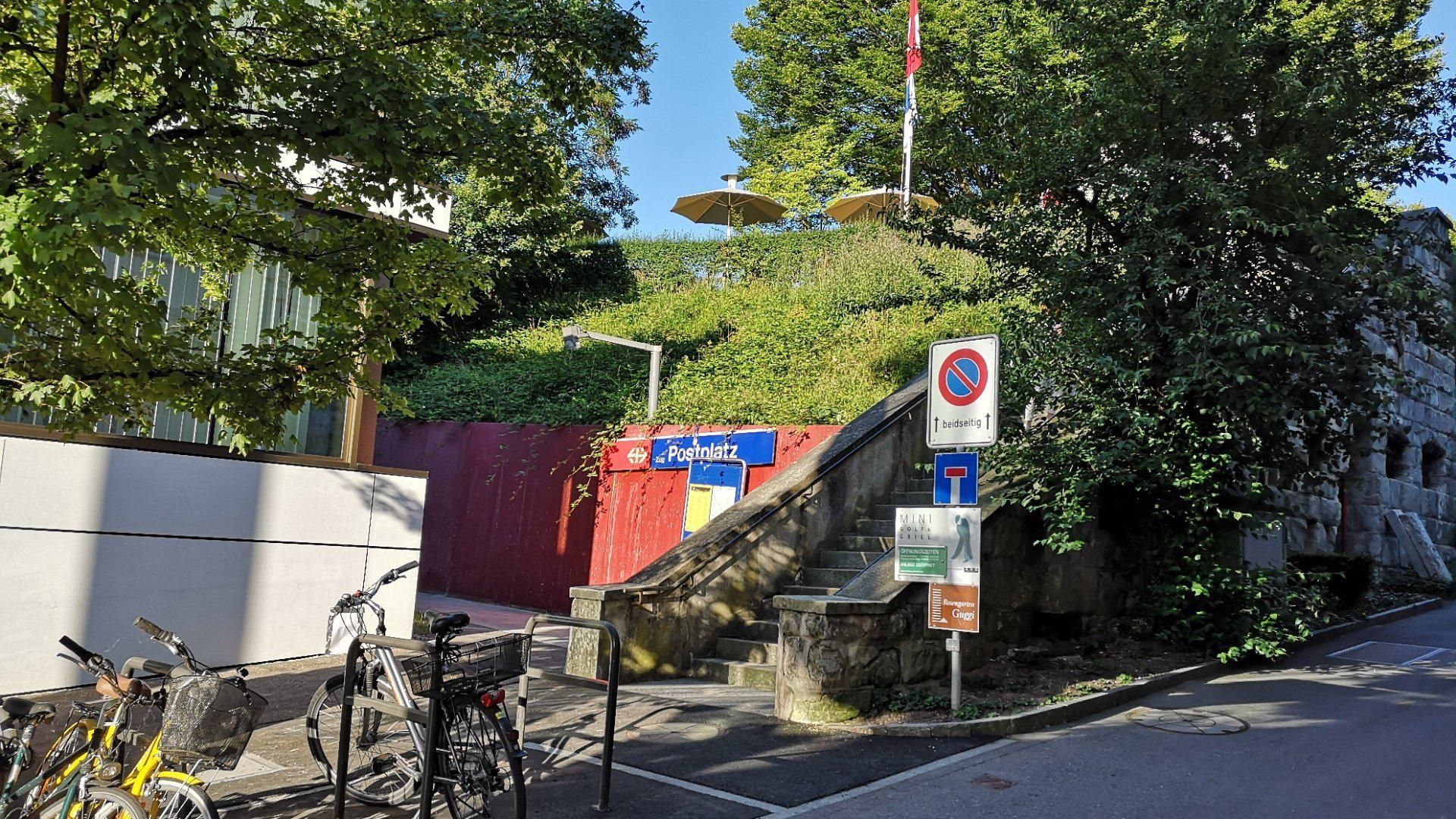
- The station entrance in 2018

General information
- Location: Zug; Switzerland
- Coordinates: 47°10′06″N 8°31′01″E
- Elevation: 427 m (1,401 ft)
- Owner: Swiss Federal Railways
- Line: Thalwil–Arth-Goldau line
- Distance: 0.6 km (0.37 mi) from Zug
- Train operators: Swiss Federal Railways
- Connections: Zugerland Verkehrsbetriebe bus lines

Other information
- Fare zone: 610 (Tarifverbund Zug)

Passengers
- 2018: 180 per weekday

Services
Preceding station	Zug Stadtbahn	Following station
Zug towards Baar Lindenpark	S2	Zug Casino towards Erstfeld
Location

Zug Postplatz railway station (German: Bahnhof Zug Postplatz) is a railway station in the municipality of Zug, in the Swiss canton of Zug. It is an intermediate stop on the standard gauge Thalwil–Arth-Goldau line of Swiss Federal Railways.

== Services ==
As of the December 2020 timetable change, the following services stop at Zug Postplatz:

- Zug Stadtbahn S2: hourly service between Baar Lindenpark and Erstfeld.
