= Flüelen railway station =

Railway station in Flüelen, Switzerland

Flüelen
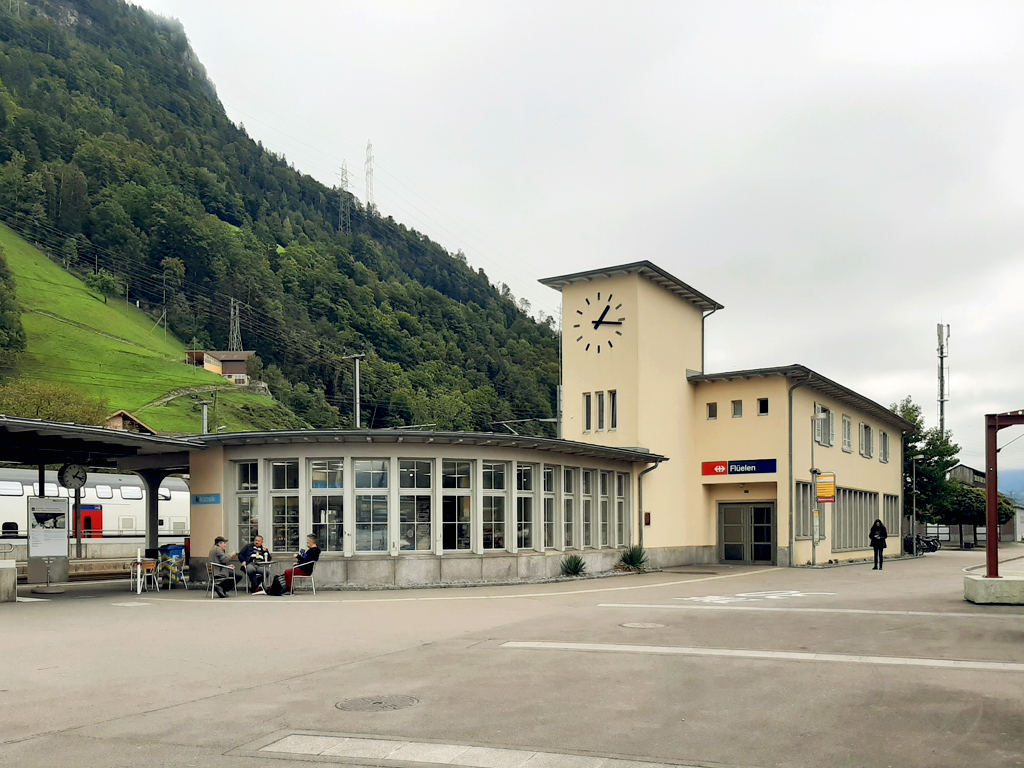
- The station building in 2020

General information
- Location: Bahnhofstrasse 1 Flüelen; Switzerland
- Coordinates: 46°54′06″N 8°37′27″E
- Elevation: 436 m (1,430 ft)
- Owner: Swiss Federal Railways
- Line: Gotthard line
- Distance: 32.3 km (20.1 mi) from Immensee
- Platforms: 2
- Tracks: 3
- Train operators: Südostbahn; Swiss Federal Railways
- Connections: SGV ferries; PostAuto Schweiz and Auto AG Uri buses

Construction
- Architect: Alfred Ramseyer (1944), Gustav Mossdorf (1882)

Passengers
- 2018: 1,800 per weekday

Services
Preceding station	Südostbahn	Following station
Brunnen towards Basel SBB	IR 26	Altdorf towards Locarno
Brunnen towards Zürich HB	IR 46	Altdorf towards Locarno
Preceding station	Zug Stadtbahn	Following station
Sisikon towards Baar Lindenpark	S2	Altdorf towards Erstfeld
Location

Flüelen railway station is a railway station in the Swiss canton of Uri and municipality of Flüelen. It is located on the Gotthard railway. The station is situated between the parallel Axenstrasse, the main road through Flüelen, and Bahnhofstrasse, with the main station buildings on Bahnhofstrasse.

Flüelen pier, on Lake Lucerne, lies on the opposite side of Bahnhofstrasse, allowing connections between trains and the boat services provided by the Schifffahrtsgesellschaft des Vierwaldstättersees (Lake Lucerne Navigation Company; SGV). This interchange forms a key part of the Gotthard Panorama Express, a tourist oriented combined paddle steamer and rail service that connects Lucerne and Locarno.

Buses operated by PostBus Switzerland serve a stop in front of the station in Bahnhofstrasse. Local buses operated by Auto AG Uri serve a stop on Axenstrasse, accessible from the station subway.

The station building is included in the Swiss Inventory of Cultural Property of National Significance. Between 1906 and 1951, the station was also the terminus of the Altdorf–Flüelen tramway, a metre gauge tramway.

== Layout ==
Flüelen has a side platform and an island platform serving tracks numbered 1 and 2–3, respectively.

== Services ==
As of the December 2021 timetable change, the following services stop at Flüelen:

- InterRegio: hourly service between Locarno and Arth-Goldau; trains continue to Basel SBB or Zürich Hauptbahnhof.
- Zug Stadtbahn S2: hourly service between Erstfeld and Baar Lindenpark.
- Gotthard Panorama Express: daily tourist oriented service via the original high level Gotthard tunnel, with connecting boat service on Lake Lucerne to Lucerne.
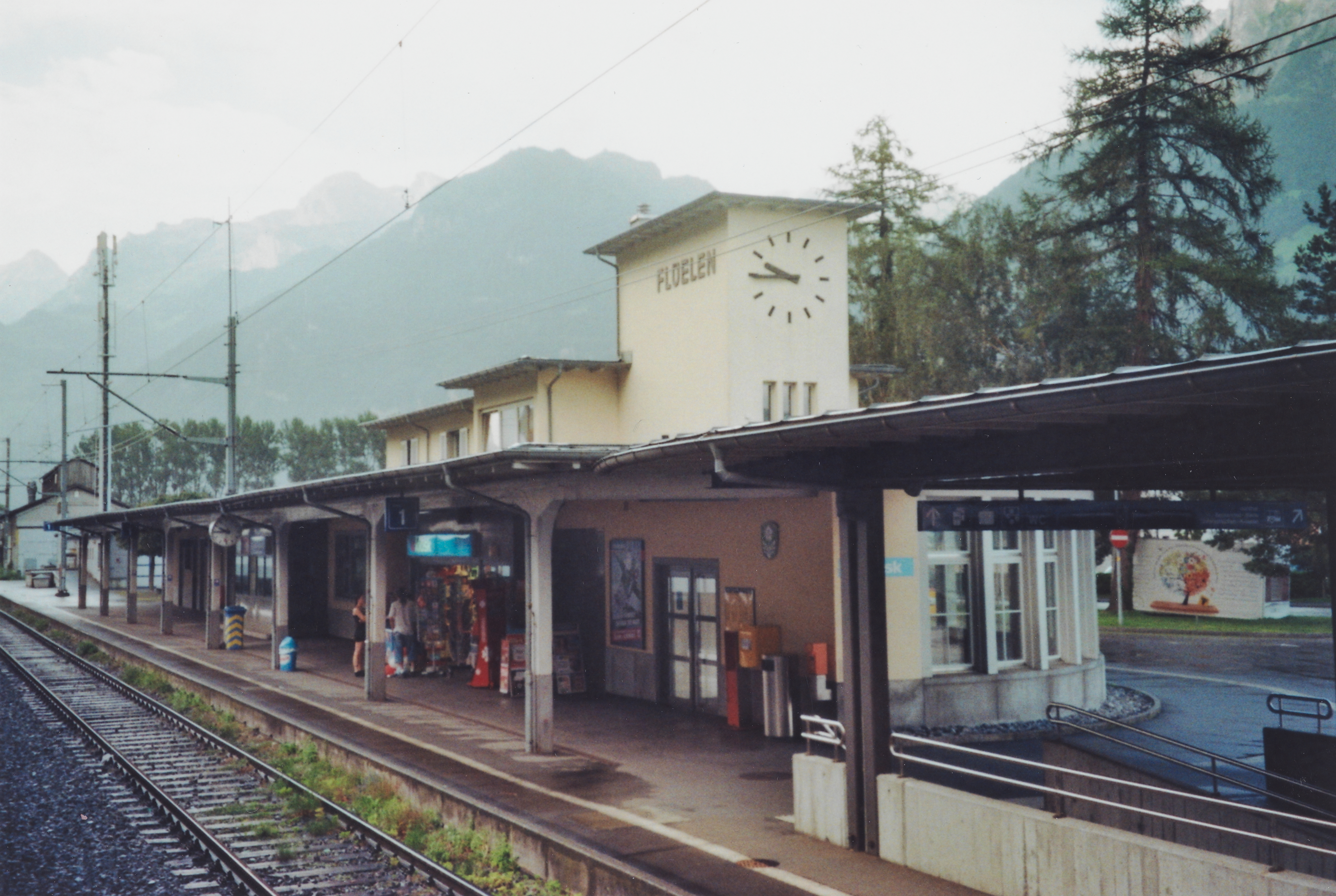
Station building (1995)

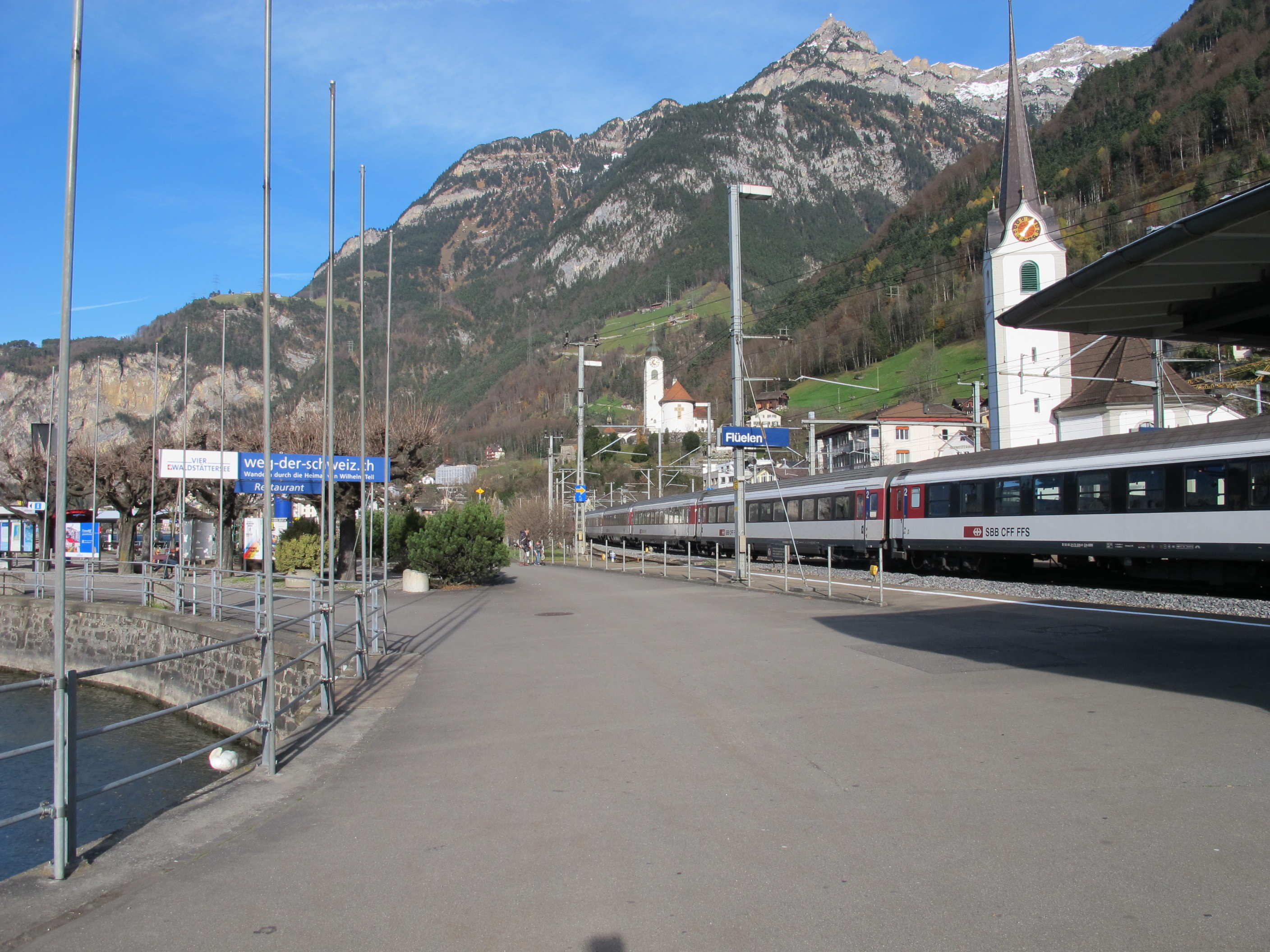
View of village and landing stage from station (2016)

== See also ==
- Rail transport in Switzerland
