= Sisikon railway station =

Railway station in Switzerland

Sisikon
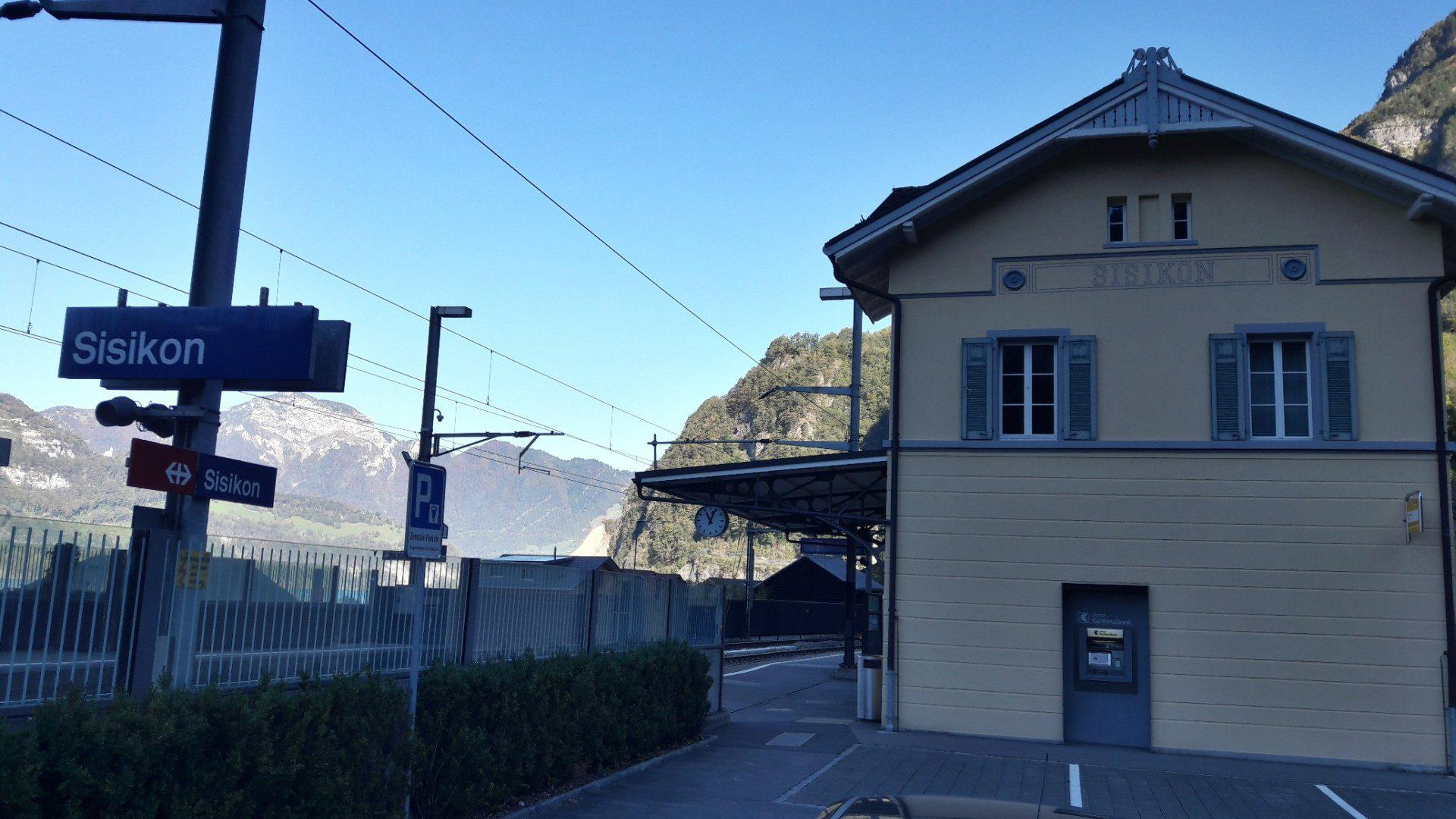
- The former station building in 2018

General information
- Location: Sisikon; Switzerland
- Coordinates: 46°56′57″N 8°37′15″E
- Elevation: 446 m (1,463 ft)
- Owner: Swiss Federal Railways
- Line: Gotthard line
- Distance: 26.4 km (16.4 mi) from Immensee
- Platforms: 2
- Tracks: 2
- Train operators: Swiss Federal Railways
- Connections: PostAuto Schweiz bus lines; Lake Lucerne Navigation Company ferries

Passengers
- 2018: 190 per weekday

Services
Preceding station	Zug Stadtbahn	Following station
Brunnen towards Baar Lindenpark	S2	Flüelen towards Erstfeld
Location

Sisikon railway station (German: Bahnhof Sisikon) is a railway station in the Swiss canton of Uri and municipality of Sisikon. The station is situated on the Gotthard railway between Arth-Goldau and Erstfeld. Sisikon has two side platforms serving two tracks.

== Services ==
As of the December 2020 timetable change, the following services stop at Sisikon:

- Zug Stadtbahn S2: hourly service between Baar Lindenpark and Erstfeld.
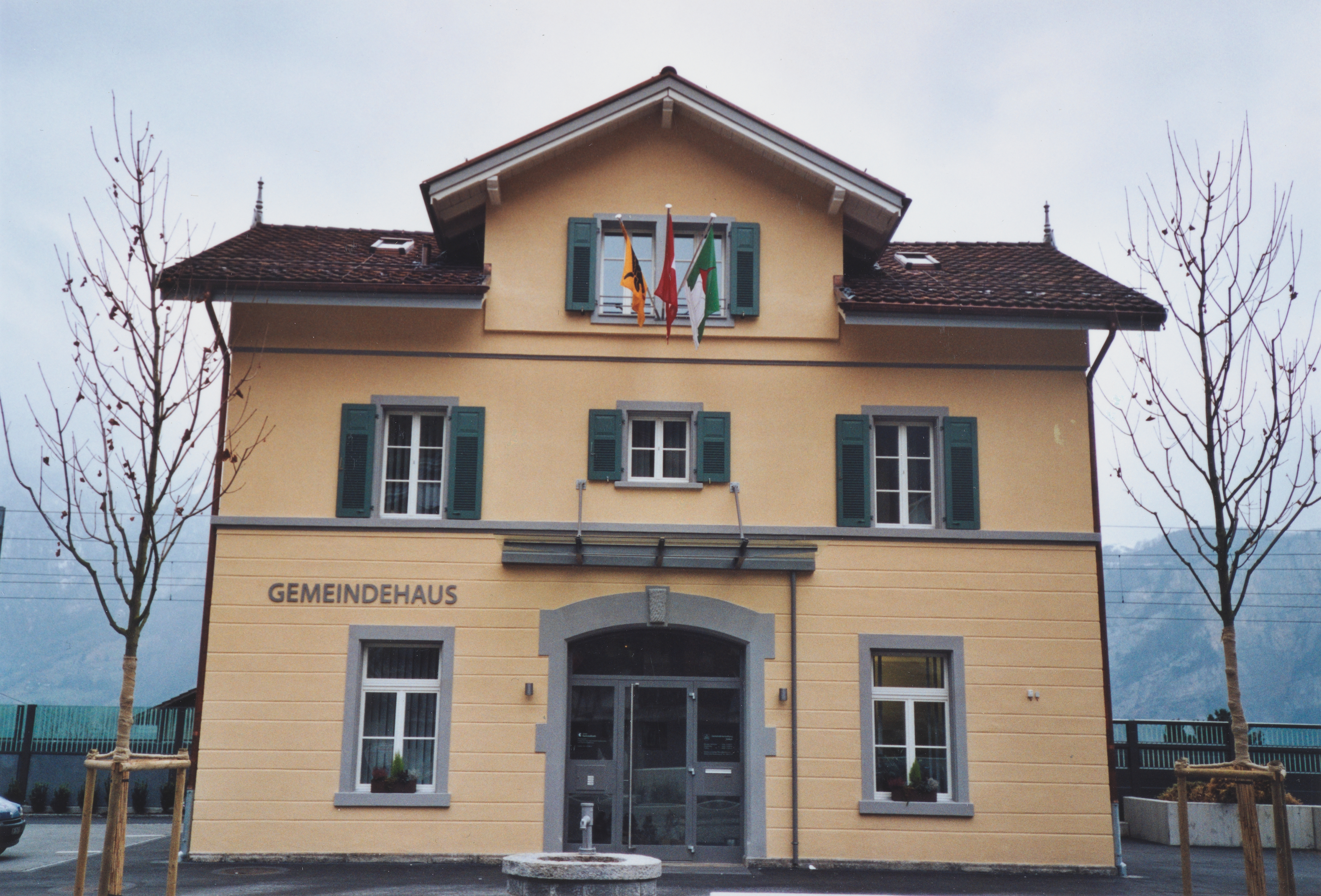
Former station building in 2006 used as town hall

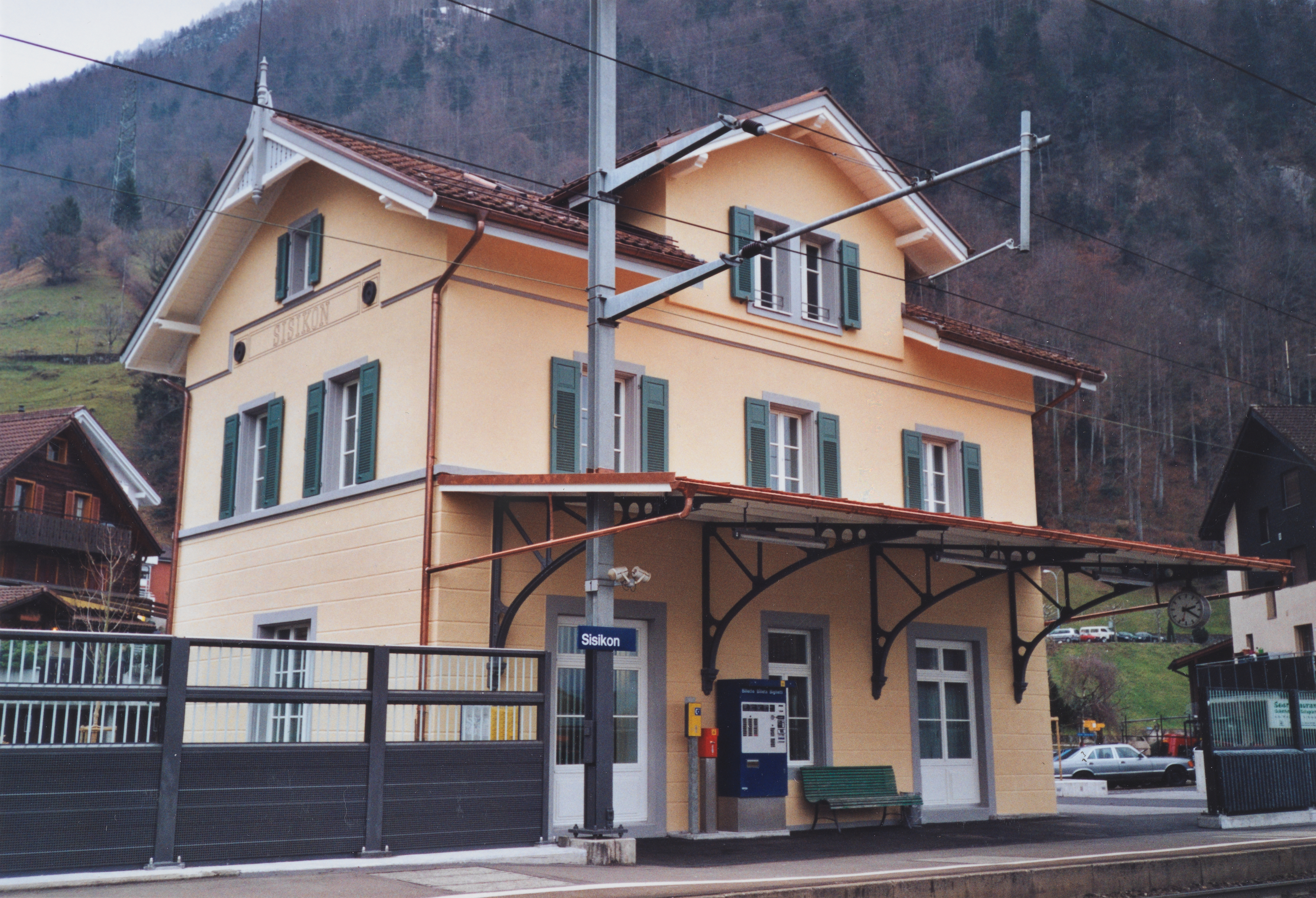
Train side also in 2006

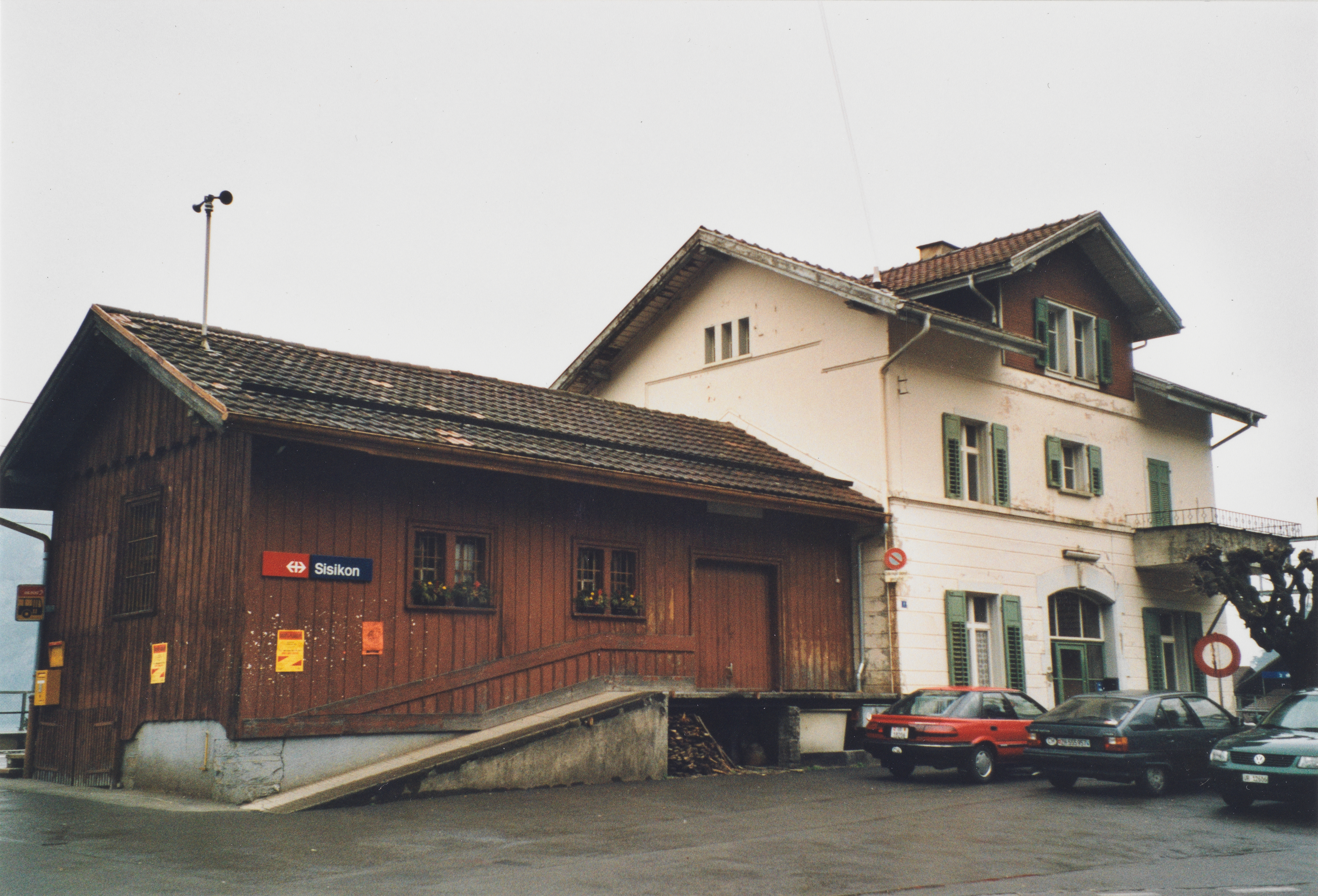
The building in 2001 with its good shed
