= Baar Neufeld railway station =

Swiss railway station

Baar Neufeld
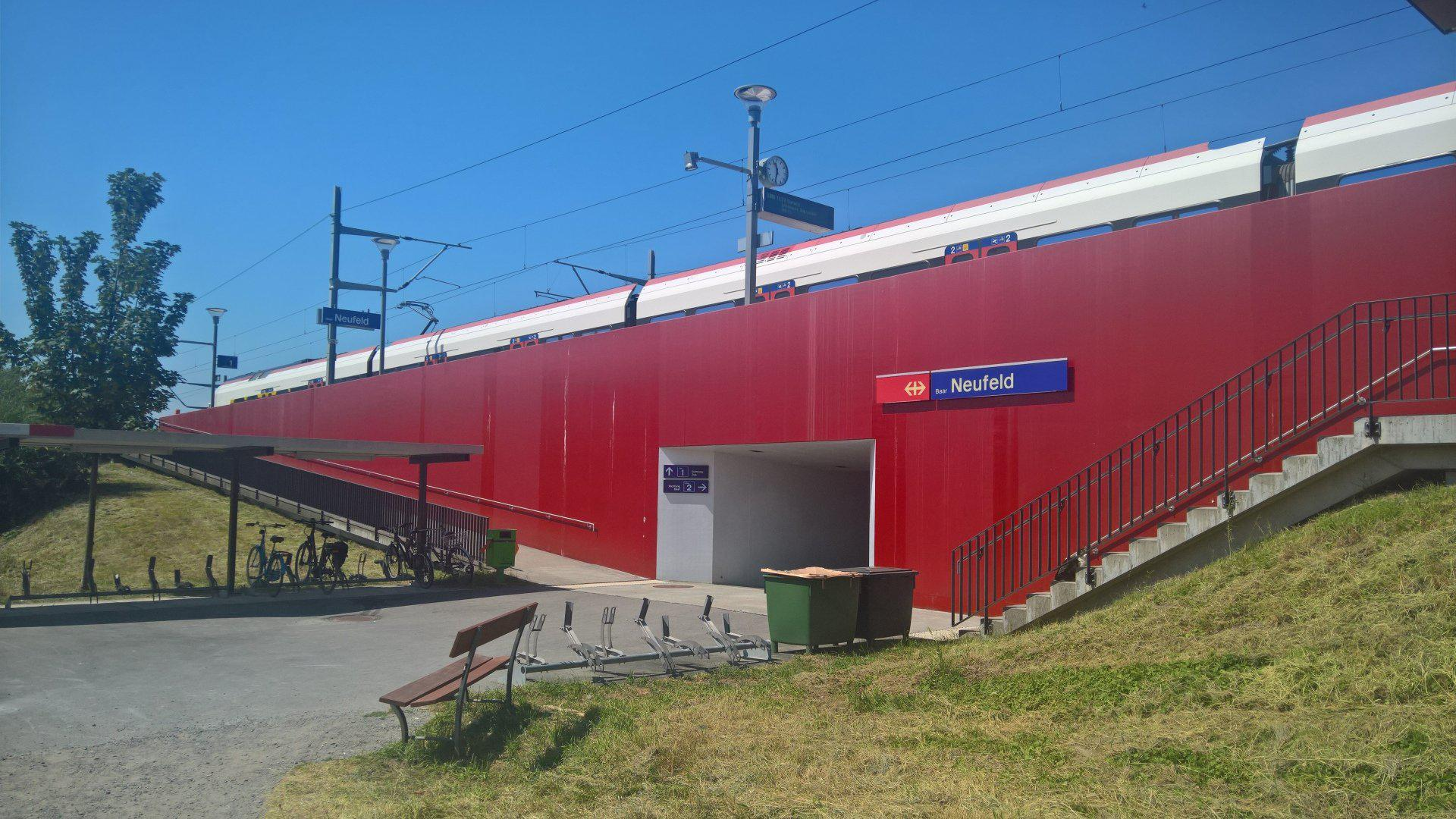
- The station platforms in 2018

General information
- Location: Baar; Switzerland
- Coordinates: 47°11′19″N 8°31′04″E
- Elevation: 435 m (1,427 ft)
- Owner: Swiss Federal Railways
- Line: Thalwil–Arth-Goldau line
- Distance: 27.6 km (17.1 mi) from Zürich HB
- Train operators: Swiss Federal Railways

Other information
- Fare zone: 623 (Tarifverbund Zug)

Passengers
- 2018: 1,200 per weekday

Services
Preceding station	Lucerne S-Bahn	Following station
Baar Lindenpark towards Sursee	S1	Baar Terminus
Preceding station	Zug Stadtbahn	Following station
Baar Lindenpark towards Rotkreuz	S1	Baar Terminus
Location

Baar Neufeld railway station (German: Bahnhof Baar Neufeld) is a railway station in the municipality of Baar, in the Swiss canton of Zug. It is an intermediate stop on the standard gauge Thalwil–Arth-Goldau line of Swiss Federal Railways.

== Services ==
As of the December 2020 timetable change, the following services stop at Baar Neufeld:

- Lucerne S-Bahn S1/Zug Stadtbahn S1: service every fifteen minutes between Rotkreuz and Baar, with every other train continuing from Rotkreuz to Sursee.
