= Altdorf railway station (Switzerland) =

Railway station in Switzerland

Altdorf UR
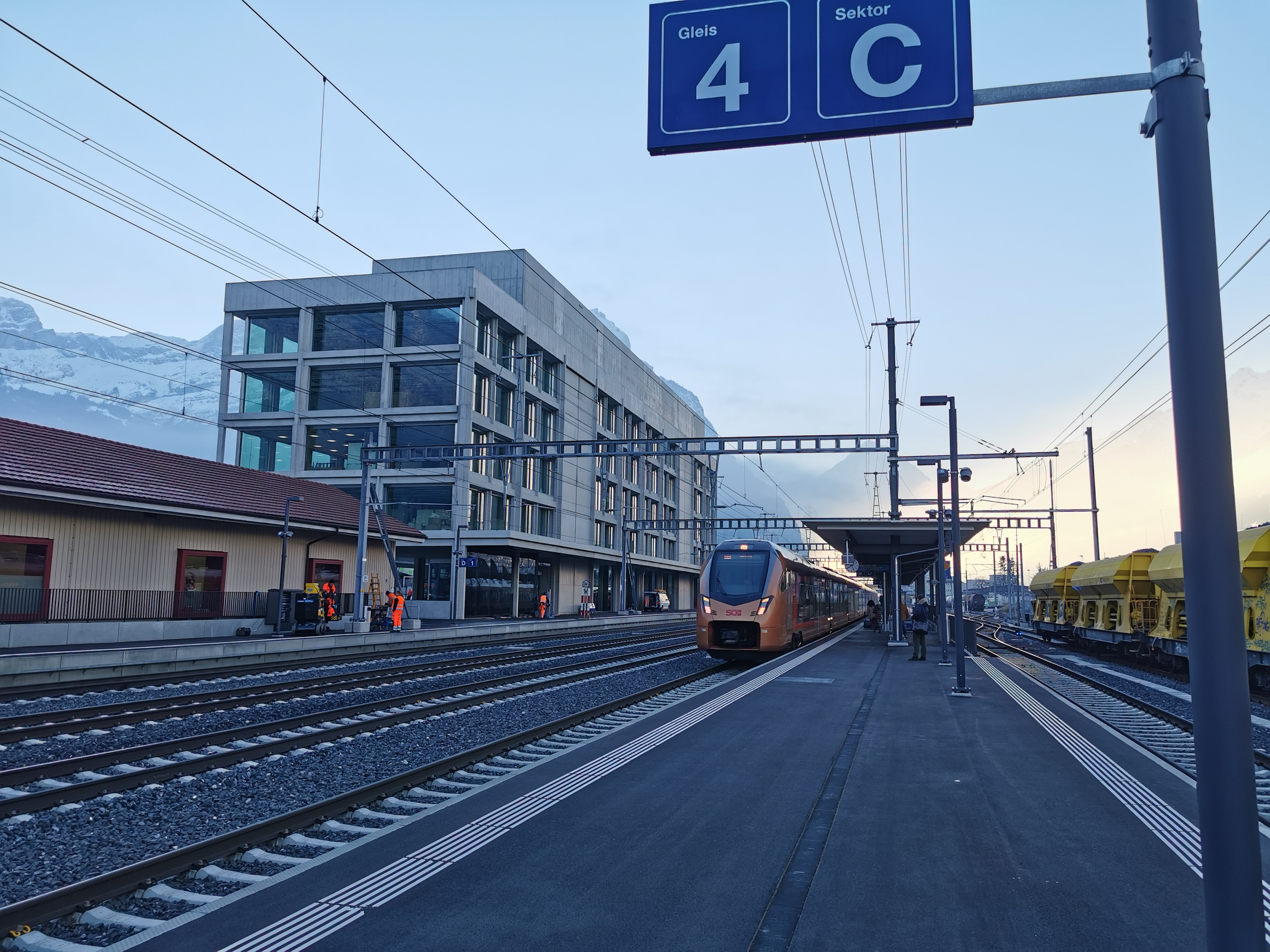
- The new station in December 2021

General information
- Location: Altdorf; Switzerland
- Coordinates: 46°52′33″N 8°37′54″E
- Elevation: 447 m (1,467 ft)
- Owner: Swiss Federal Railways
- Line: Gotthard line
- Platforms: 1 island platform; 1 side platform
- Tracks: 3
- Train operators: Südostbahn; Swiss Federal Railways
- Connections: Auto AG Uri; PostAuto Schweiz; Tellbus Altdorf–Luzern

History
- Former names: Altdorf (before December 2020)

Services
Preceding station	SBB CFF FFS	Following station
Arth-Goldau towards Basel SBB	EuroCity	Bellinzona towards Milano Centrale
Arth-Goldau towards Basel SBB	IC 21	Bellinzona towards Lugano
Preceding station	Südostbahn	Following station
Flüelen towards Basel SBB	IR 26	Erstfeld towards Locarno
Flüelen towards Zürich HB	IR 46	Erstfeld towards Locarno
Preceding station	Zug Stadtbahn	Following station
Flüelen towards Baar Lindenpark	S2	Erstfeld Terminus
Location

Altdorf railway station is a railway station in the Swiss canton of Uri and municipality of Altdorf. The station is situated on the Gotthard railway north of its crossing of the Alps, and is the most southerly station before that line splits into the older route via Erstfeld and the original Gotthard Tunnel, and the newer route via the Gotthard Base Tunnel. The station was reconstructed between 2019 and 2021.

== Layout and connections ==
Altdorf has a side platform with a single track (No. 1) and an island platform with two tracks (Nos. 4–5). Both are 220 metres (720 ft) long.

Altdorf is a major hub for bus services in the Canton of Uri. Auto AG Uri operates local bus services to Schattdorf, Seedorf, Isleten, Isenthal, Unterschächen, Spiringen, Bürglen, Attinghausen, Erstfeld, Silenen, and Amsteg. There are also two express bus services: the Tellbus Altdorf–Luzern (operated by Auto AG Uri) to Lucerne, and the Winkelriedbus (operated by PostAuto Schweiz) to Stans.

== Services ==
As of the December 2022 timetable change, the following services stop at Altdorf:

- EuroCity: two round-trips per day between Basel SBB and Milano Centrale via the base tunnel.
- InterCity: service every two hours between Lugano and Basel SBB via the base tunnel.
- InterRegio: hourly service between Locarno and Arth-Goldau via the original high-level route; trains continue to Basel SBB or Zürich Hauptbahnhof.
- Zug Stadtbahn S2: hourly service between Erstfeld and Baar Lindenpark.

Other InterCity and EuroCity passenger trains pass through the station without stopping, as does the considerable freight traffic on the Gotthard route.

== See also ==
- Rail transport in Switzerland
