= S-Bahn Zentralschweiz =

S-Bahn Zentralschweiz (Central Swiss Suburban Railway) may refer to:

- Lucerne S-Bahn
- Zug Stadtbahn
