= Baar railway station =

Railway station in Switzerland

Baar
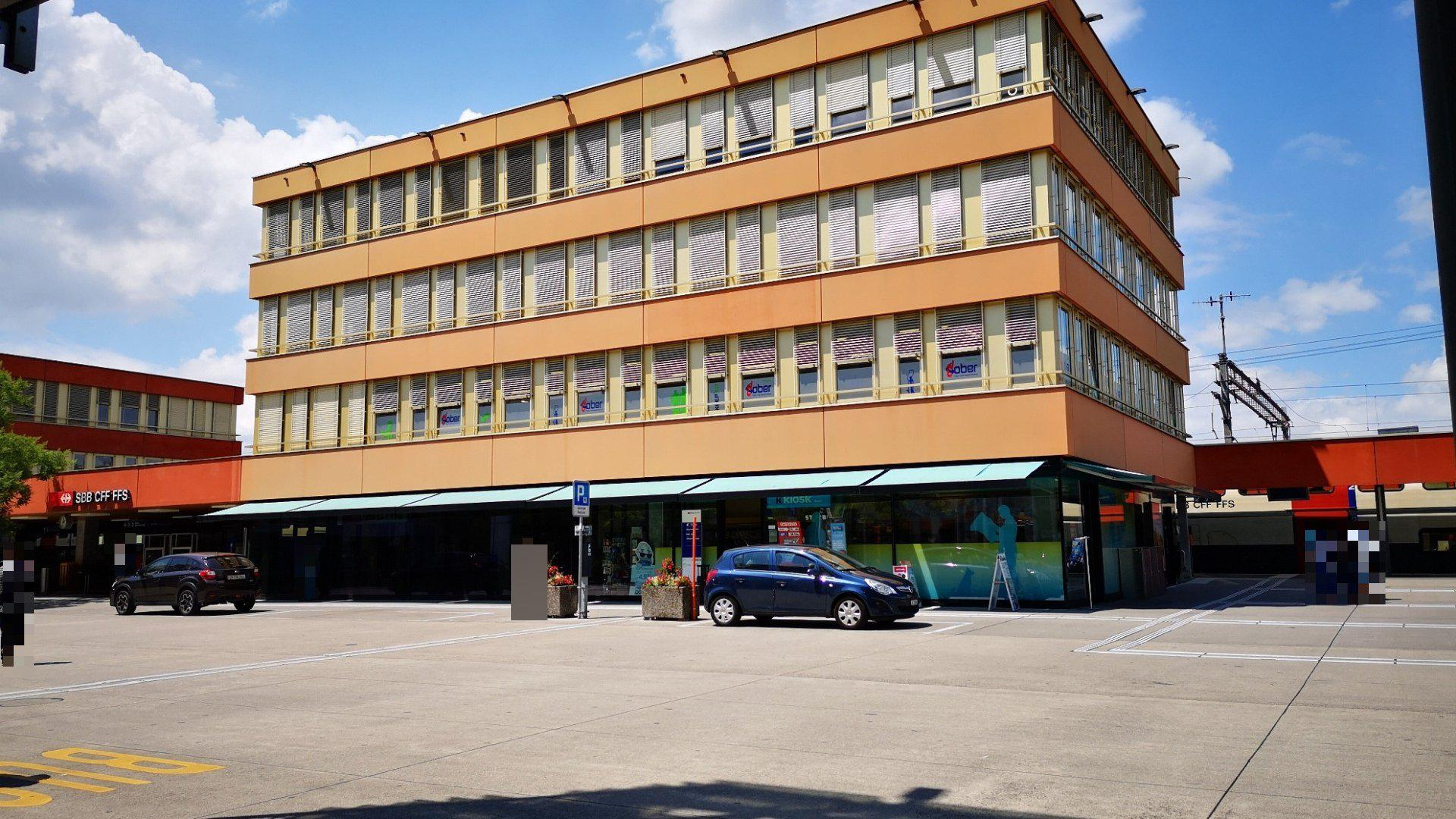
- The station building in 2018

General information
- Location: Bahnhofplatz; Baar; Switzerland
- Coordinates: 47°11′43″N 8°31′24″E
- Elevation: 444 m (1,457 ft)
- Owner: Swiss Federal Railways
- Line: Thalwil–Arth-Goldau line
- Distance: 26.6 km (16.5 mi) from Zürich HB
- Train operators: Swiss Federal Railways
- Connections: Zugerland Verkehrsbetriebe bus lines

Other information
- Fare zone: 623 (Tarifverbund Zug)

Passengers
- 2018: 10,700 per weekday

Services
Preceding station	SBB CFF FFS	Following station
Zug towards Lucerne	IR 75	Thalwil towards Konstanz
Preceding station	Lucerne S-Bahn	Following station
Baar Neufeld towards Sursee	S1	Terminus
Preceding station	Zug Stadtbahn	Following station
Baar Neufeld towards Rotkreuz	S1	Terminus
Preceding station	Zurich S-Bahn	Following station
Zug Terminus	S24	Horgen Oberdorf towards Thayngen or Weinfelden
Location

Baar railway station (German: Bahnhof Baar) is a railway station in the Swiss canton of Zug, situated in the municipality of Baar. The station is located on the Thalwil–Arth-Goldau railway and is an intermediate stop for InterRegio trains from Zürich to Lucerne and on Zürich S-Bahn line S24. It is also the northern terminus of the Zug Stadtbahn S1 line.

== Services ==
As of the December 2020 timetable change, the following services stop at Baar:

- InterRegio: hourly service between Lucerne and Konstanz, via Zürich HB.
- Lucerne S-Bahn S1/Zug Stadtbahn S1: service every 15 minutes to Rotkreuz, with every other train continuing from Rotkreuz to Sursee.
- Zürich S-Bahn S24: half-hourly service between Zug and Winterthur; trains continue from Winterthur to either Thayngen or Weinfelden.

== See also ==
- Rail transport in Switzerland
