= Buschenchappeli =

- Buschenchappeli
- 47°06′43″N 8°32′38″E
- Location: Früebüel, 6318 Walchwil
- Country: Switzerland

Architecture
- Years built: 18th century

Buschenchappeli (or Buschenkappeli) is a chapel in the Swiss village of Walchwil. Situated on Walchwilerberg, overlooking the Lotenbach and with an elevation of around 3,300 feet (1,000 m), it is first mentioned in literature in 1754. It is located around 2 miles (3.2 km) from the eastern shores of the Zugersee.

The reason for its construction is unclear. One account states it was built by peasants in gratitude for their being spared from the plague; another says it was built to protect grazing cattle from lightning strikes. A third theory is that a foreign officer stationed here during the French Revolution got lost in the area for several days. He swore that if he saw his homeland again, he would have a chapel built in this area. This account postdates the 1754 appearance in history books, however.

The chapel was renovated in 1966. The consecration of the bell, featuring the bell god Marie Müller (known as Stoffels Marie), took place in July of that year.

It was restored again in 1987, under the guidance of the cantonal monument preservation and with donations from the Walchwil Yodelling Club.
