= Walchwil =

- Municipality
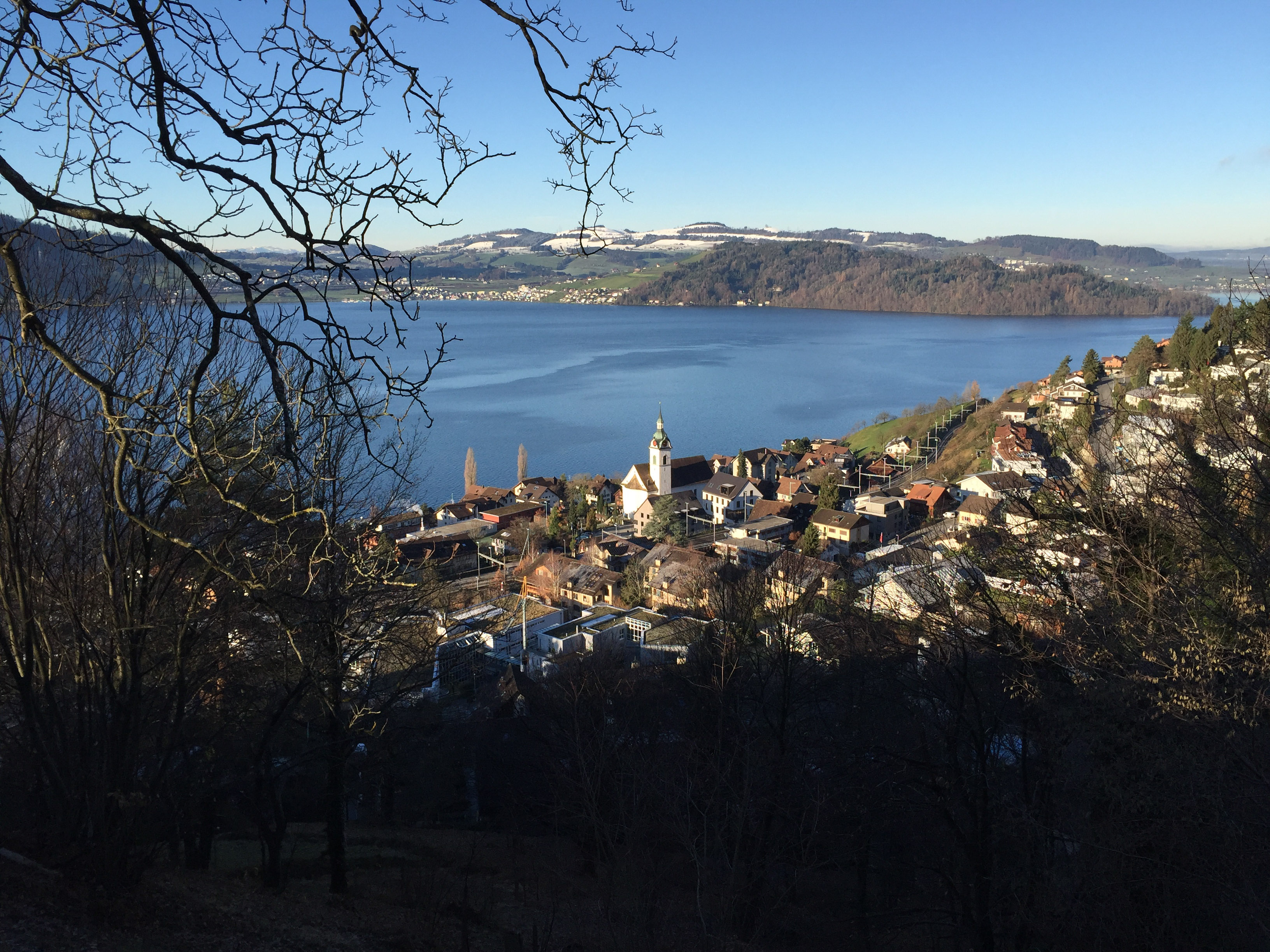

- Flag Coat of arms
- Location of Walchwil
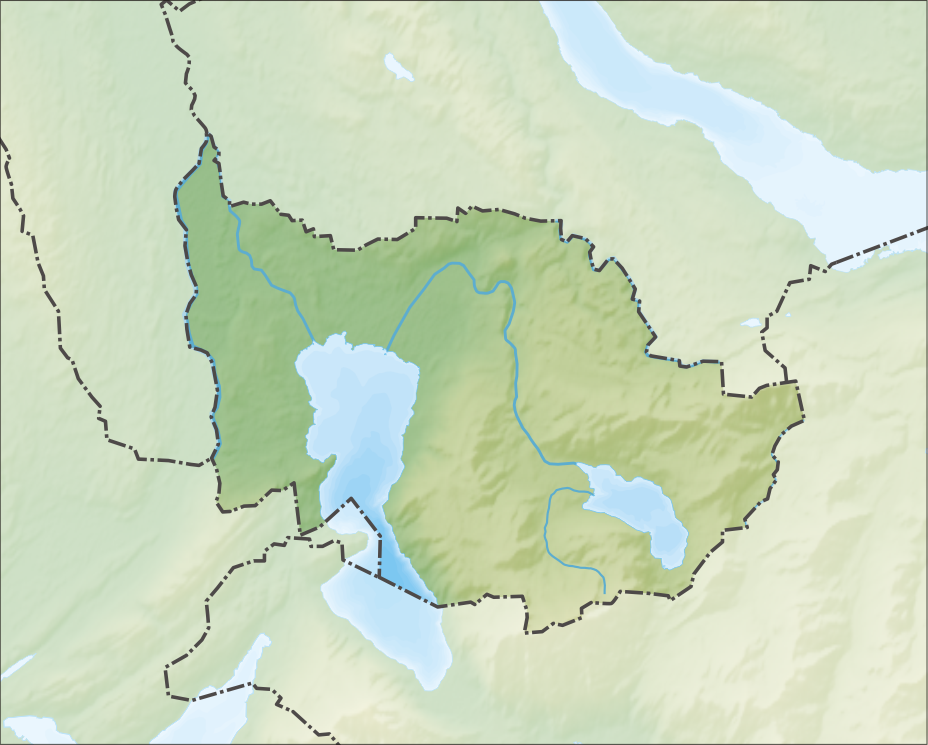
- Location within Switzerland Location within Canton of Zug
- Coordinates: 47°6′N 8°31′E
- Country: Switzerland
- Canton: Zug
- District: n.a.

Government
  - Mayor: Stefan Hermann CVP/PDC

Area
  - Total: 15.90 km^{2} (6.14 sq mi)
- Elevation (Railroad station): 449 m (1,473 ft)
- Highest elevation (Hagegg (mountain)): 1,250 m (4,100 ft)
- Lowest elevation (Lake Zug): 415 m (1,362 ft)

Population (December 2020)
  - Total: 3,820
  - Density: 240/km^{2} (622/sq mi)
- Time zone: UTC+01:00 (CET)
  - Summer (DST): UTC+02:00 (CEST)
- Postal code: 6318
- SFOS number: 1710
- ISO 3166 code: CH-ZG
- Surrounded by: Arth (SZ), (Küssnacht (SZ), Merlischachen (LU)), Unterägeri, Zug
- Website: www.walchwil.ch

Walchwil is a village and a municipality in the canton of Zug in Switzerland.

== History ==
Walchwil is first mentioned in 1283 as Walchwile.

== Geography ==
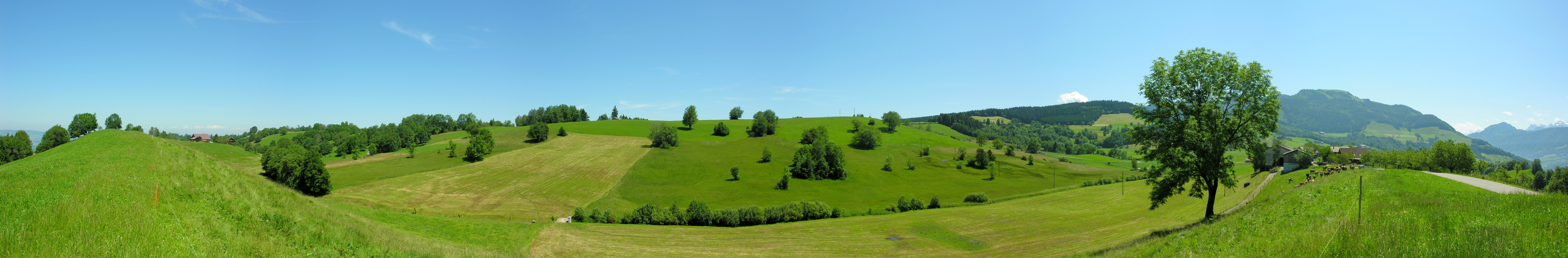
Oberdorf section of Walchwil

Aerial view by Walter Mittelholzer (1919)

Walchwil has an area, as of 2006, of 13.5 km^{2} (5.2 sq mi). Of this area, 41.5% is used for agricultural purposes, while 45.5% is forested. Of the rest of the land, 8.2% is settled (buildings or roads) and the remainder (4.7%) is non-productive (rivers, glaciers or mountains).

The municipality is located on the eastern shore of Lake Zug on the south side of Zugerberg (1,000 m (3,300 ft)). It consists of the villages of Walchwil and Oberdorf (also known as Emmeten).

== Demographics ==
Walchwil has a population (as of 31 December 2020) of 3,820. As of 2007, 29.9% of the population was made up of foreign nationals. Over the last 10 years the population has grown at a rate of 7.6%. Most of the population (as of 2000) speaks German (82.4%), with English being second most common ( 6.1%) and French being third ( 1.8%).

In the 2007 federal election the most popular party was the CVP which received 35.5% of the vote. The next three most popular parties were the SVP (30.1%), the FDP (16.6%) and the Green Party (10.1%).

In Walchwil about 82% of the population (between age 25-64) have completed either non-mandatory upper secondary education or additional higher education (either university or a Fachhochschule).

Walchwil has an unemployment rate of 1.29%. As of 2005, there were 161 people employed in the primary economic sector and about 46 businesses involved in this sector. 247 people are employed in the secondary sector and there are 29 businesses in this sector. 451 people are employed in the tertiary sector, with 137 businesses in this sector.

The historical population is given in the following table:

year	population
1771	671
1850	1,039
1900	1,059
1950	1,226
1970	1,675
1990	2,654

== Transportation ==
The municipality has two railway stations: Walchwil and Walchwil Hörndli. Both are located on the Thalwil–Arth-Goldau line.

== See also ==
- Buschenchappeli
