= Isleten =

Coordinates: 46°55′N 8°35′E

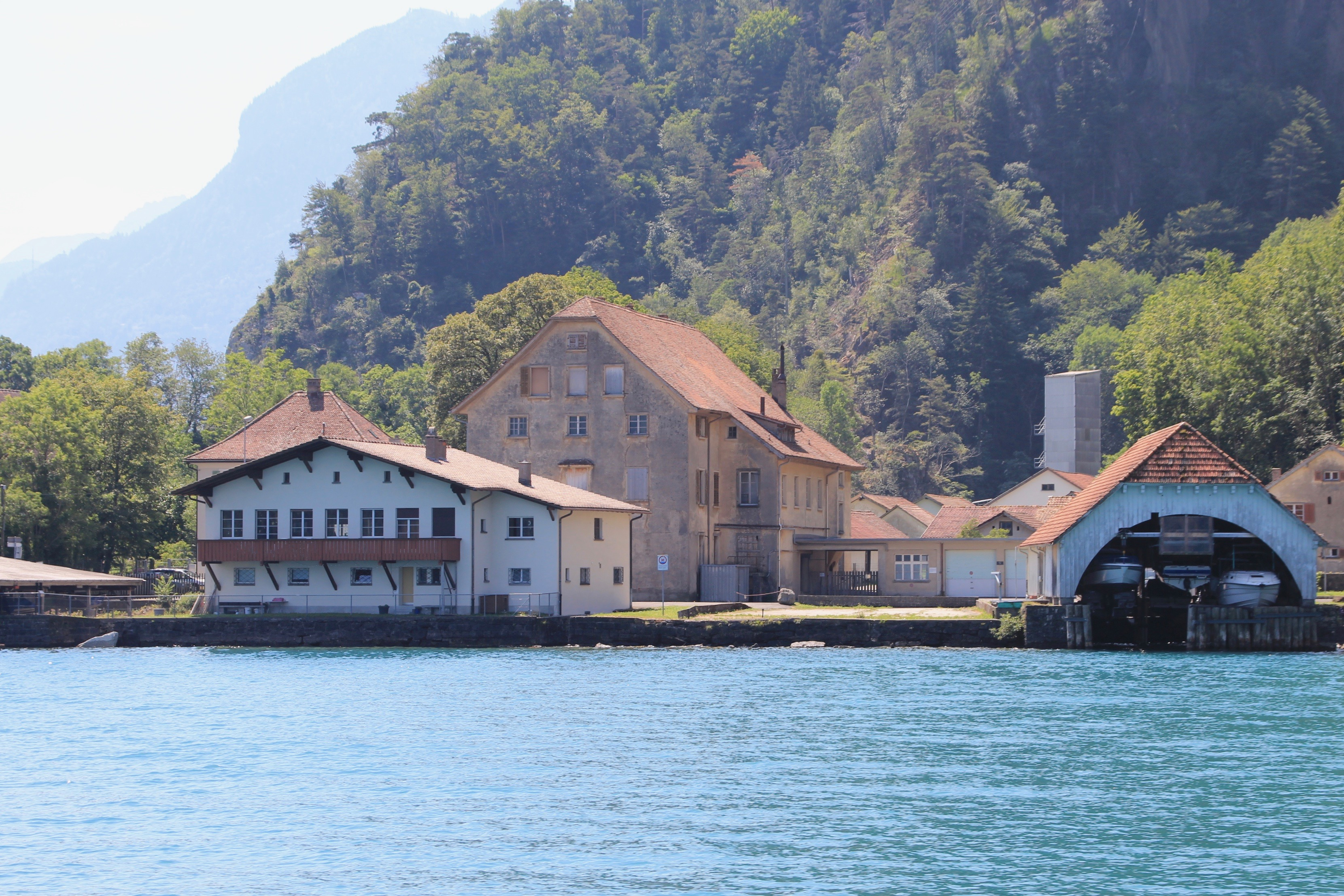
Isleten

Isleten is a village in the municipality of Isenthal, Uri, Switzerland.
