= Arth-Goldau railway station =

Railway station in Switzerland

Arth-Goldau
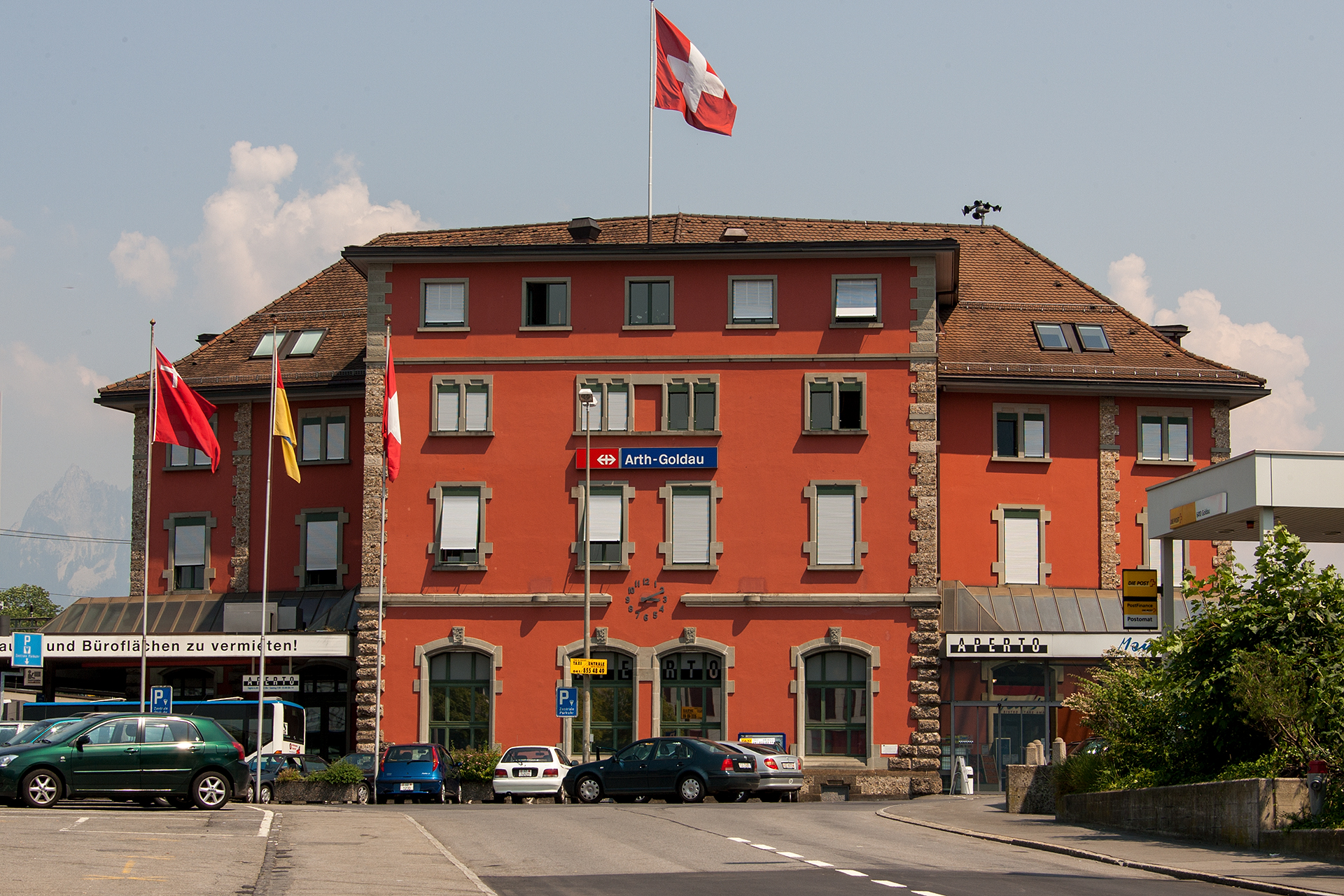
- The station building in 2005

General information
- Location: Arth; Switzerland
- Coordinates: 47°02′57″N 8°32′58″E
- Elevation: 510 m (1,670 ft)
- Owner: Swiss Federal Railways
- Lines: Gotthard line; Pfäffikon–Arth-Goldau; Thalwil–Arth-Goldau line
- Distance: 8.9 km (5.5 mi) from Immensee; 15.8 km (9.8 mi) from Zug; 38.6 km (24.0 mi) from Rapperswil
- Platforms: 4
- Tracks: 6
- Train operators: Swiss Federal Railways; Südostbahn
- Connections
- Ship: SGZ on Lake Zug (from Arth)
- Train: Cogwheel railway to Rigi
- Bus: Zugerland Verkehrsbetriebe and Auto AG Schwyz buses

Other information
- Fare zone: 674 and 675 (Tarifverbund Schwyz)

History
- Opened: 1876

Passengers
- 2025: 20,100 per day (SBB, SOB)
- Rank: 37 out of 1,095
Services
Preceding station	SBB CFF FFS	Following station
Lucerne towards Frankfurt (Main) Hbf	EuroCity	Bellinzona towards Milano Centrale
Zug towards Zürich HB	EuroCity	Bellinzona towards Bologna Centrale, Genova Piazza Principe, Milano Centrale or Venezia Santa Lucia
Zug towards Zürich HB	IC 2	Bellinzona towards Lugano
Lucerne towards Basel SBB	IC 21	Altdorf towards Lugano
Rotkreuz towards Olten	RE6 Limited service	Terminus
Preceding station	Südostbahn	Following station
Küssnacht am Rigi towards Lucerne	Voralpen Express	Rothenthurm towards St. Gallen
Lucerne towards Basel SBB	IR 26	Schwyz towards Locarno
Zug towards Zürich HB	IR 46	Schwyz towards Locarno
Preceding station	Zug Stadtbahn	Following station
Walchwil towards Baar Lindenpark	S2	Steinen towards Erstfeld
Preceding station	Lucerne S-Bahn	Following station
Immensee towards Lucerne	S3	Steinen towards Brunnen
Terminus	S31	Steinerberg towards Biberbrugg
Location
- Location within Switzerland Location within Canton of Schwyz

Arth-Goldau railway station (German: Bahnhof Arth-Goldau) is a railway station in the Swiss canton of Schwyz and municipality of Arth. The station is located in the centre of the village of Goldau, which forms part of Arth.

The station is an important junction, where the Zug–Arth-Goldau line joins the main line of the Gotthard line, and also where the Südostbahn-owned Pfäffikon–Arth-Goldau line diverges.

== Layout ==
Arth-Goldau is a keilbahnhof: a station located between two converging railway lines. The north-south Zug–Arth-Goldau line joins the main line of the east-west Gotthard line. Both lines have two platforms serving three tracks. Additionally, the Arth–Rigi line terminates in its own platforms above and at right angles to the Gotthard platforms.

== Statue at Arth-Goldau Train Station ==
A new public art installation featuring 15 life-sized sculptures has been unveiled at Arth-Goldau train station, launched on September 1, 2025, as part of the "Nächster Halt" (Next Stop) project. This initiative celebrates two major anniversaries: 150 years of the Arth-Rigi-Bahn and 100 years of the Natur- und Tierpark Goldau.

The sculptures, created by local artist Bernhard "Beni" Annen, include a mix of historical and symbolic figures such as:

- A historical Rigi-Bahn conductor
- Two Schwinger (Swiss wrestlers)
- A hiker
- Two litter bearers with a sedan chair
- A bear from the nearby wildlife park
- A fish otter bathing in a fountain
- A fox rummaging through a trash can
- A bearded vulture

These bronze-painted, steel-framed figures are integrated into the station environment, interacting with infrastructure and passengers.

== Services ==
As of the December 2023 timetable change, the following services stop at Arth-Goldau:

- EuroCity:
  - half-hourly service between Zürich HB and Lugano through Gotthard Base Tunnel, with hourly services continuing to Bologna Centrale, Genova Piazza Principe, Milano Centrale, Milano Porta Garibaldi, or Venezia Santa Lucia.
- InterCity:
  - : Hourly service through the Gotthard Base Tunnel between Zürich HB and Lugano.
  - : Hourly service through the Gotthard Base Tunnel between Basel SBB and Lugano, via Luzern.
- InterRegio:
  - Voralpen Express: Hourly service between Luzern and St. Gallen via Rapperswil.
  - : Hourly service on the Gotthard line between Locarno and Basel SBB via Luzern.
  - : Half-hourly service on the Gotthard line between Locarno and Zürich HB via Zug.
- RegioExpress:
  - : three round-trips on weekends to Olten.
- Zug Stadtbahn S2: hourly service between Baar Lindenpark and Erstfeld.
- Lucerne S-Bahn:
  - S3: hourly service between Lucerne and Brunnen.
  - S31: hourly service to Biberbrugg.
- Gotthard Panorama Express: daily tourist oriented service to Lugano via the original high level Gotthard tunnel, with connecting boat service on Lake Lucerne to Lucerne.

== See also ==
- Rail transport in Switzerland
