= Rotkreuz railway station =

Swiss railway station

Rotkreuz
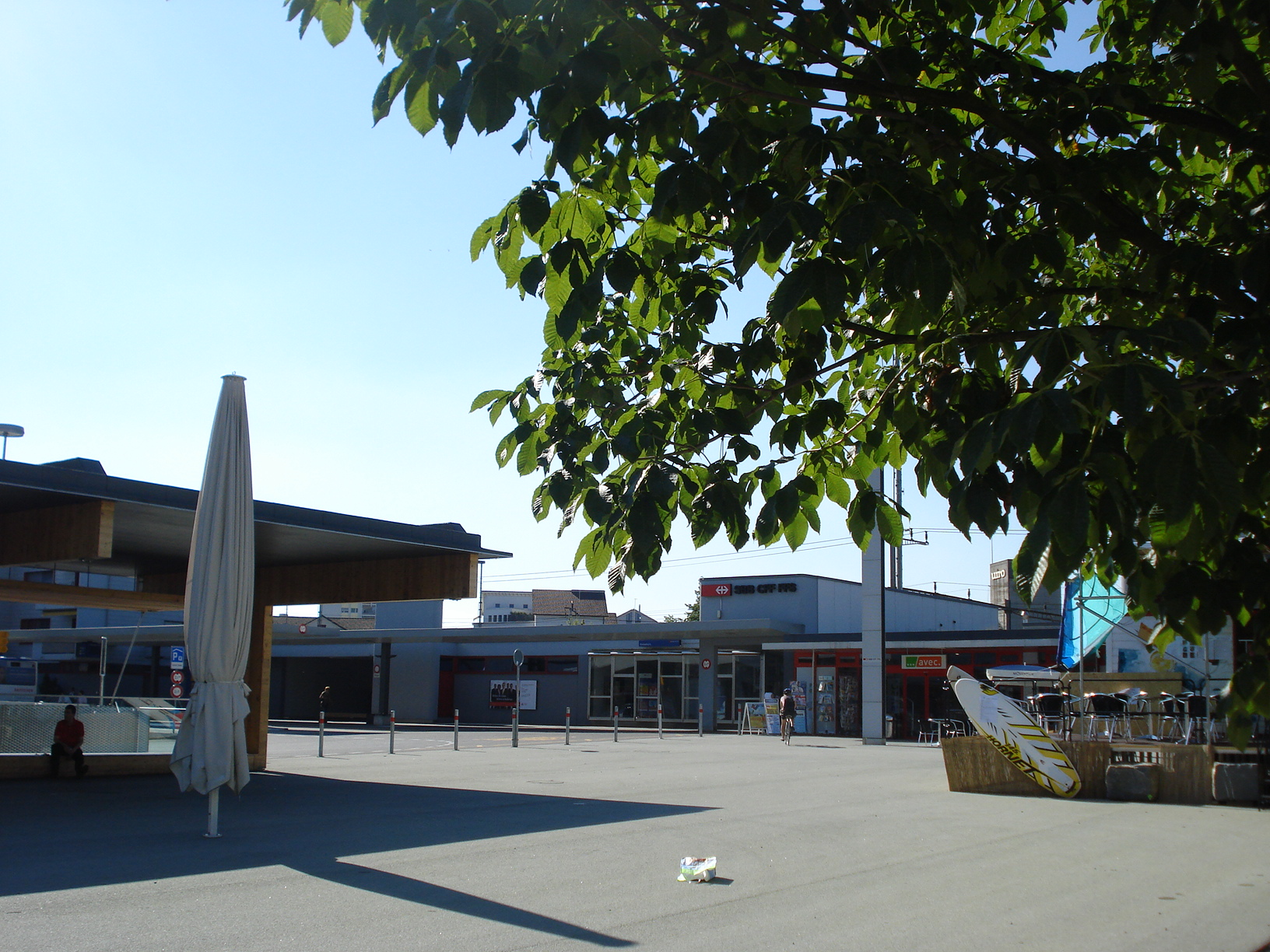
- The station entrance in 2008

General information
- Location: Risch-Rotkreuz; Switzerland
- Coordinates: 47°08′30″N 8°25′50″E
- Elevation: 429 m (1,407 ft)
- Owner: Swiss Federal Railways
- Lines: Rupperswil–Immensee line; Zug–Lucerne line
- Distance: 49.0 km (30.4 mi) from Zürich HB; 99.4 km (61.8 mi) from Basel SBB
- Train operators: Swiss Federal Railways
- Connections: Zugerland Verkehrsbetriebe and PostAuto Schweiz bus lines

Other information
- Fare zone: 28 (Passepartout); 621 (Tarifverbund Zug)

History
- Former names: Rothkreuz

Passengers
- 2025: 15,300 per day (SBB, SOB)
- Rank: 57 out of 1,095 (Note: Tied with Zürich Enge railway station.)

Services
Preceding station	SBB CFF FFS	Following station
Lucerne Terminus	IR 75	Zug towards Konstanz
Muri AG towards Olten	RE6 Limited service	Arth-Goldau Terminus
Preceding station	Lucerne S-Bahn	Following station
Gisikon-Root towards Sursee	S1	Hünenberg Chämleten towards Baar
Preceding station	Zug Stadtbahn	Following station
Terminus	S1	Hünenberg Chämleten towards Baar
Preceding station	Aargau S-Bahn	Following station
Oberrüti towards Olten	S26	Terminus
Location

Rotkreuz railway station (German: Bahnhof Rotkreuz) is a railway station in the municipality of Risch-Rotkreuz, in the Swiss canton of Zug. It is located at the junction of the standard gauge Rupperswil–Immensee and Zug–Lucerne lines of Swiss Federal Railways.

== Services ==
As of the December 2023 timetable change, the following services stop at Rotkreuz:

- InterRegio: hourly service between Lucerne and Konstanz.
- RegioExpress: three round-trips on weekends between Olten and Arth-Goldau.
- Lucerne S-Bahn S1/Zug Stadtbahn S1: service every half-hour to Sursee and every fifteen minutes to Baar.
- Aargau S-Bahn: half-hourly service to Lenzburg, with every other train continuing to Olten.

== See also ==
- Rail transport in Switzerland
