= Zug railway station =

Railway station in Switzerland

Zug
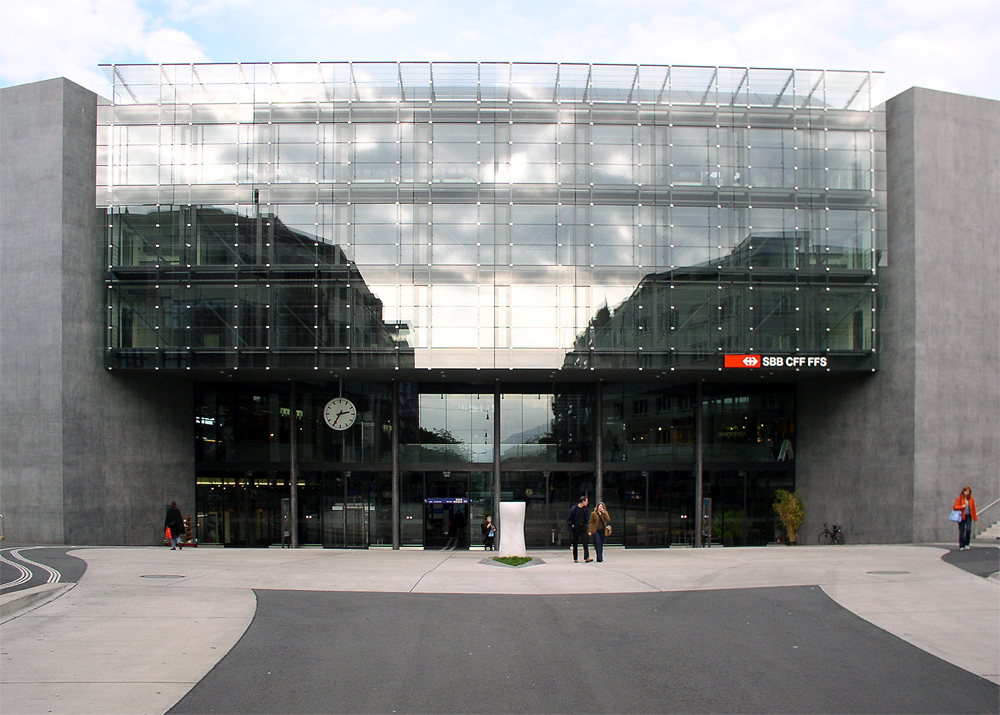
- Entrance to the 2001–2004 station building

General information
- Location: Bahnhofplatz; Zug; Switzerland
- Coordinates: 47°10′25″N 8°30′55″E
- Elevation: 425 m (1,394 ft)
- Owner: Swiss Federal Railways
- Lines: Thalwil–Arth-Goldau line; Zug–Lucerne line; Zürich–Zug line
- Distance: 29.2 km (18.1 mi) from Zürich HB
- Platforms: 4
- Tracks: 7
- Train operators: Südostbahn; Swiss Federal Railways
- Connections: Zugerland Verkehrsbetriebe bus lines

Construction
- Architect: Klaus Hornberger

Other information
- Fare zone: 610 (Tarifverbund Zug)

History
- Opened: 1 June 1897

Passengers
- 2025: 42,100 per day (SBB, SOB)
- Rank: 16 out of 1,095

Services
Preceding station	SBB CFF FFS	Following station
Zürich HB Terminus	EuroCity	Arth-Goldau towards Bologna Centrale, Genova Piazza Principe, Milano Centrale or Venezia Santa Lucia
Zürich HB Terminus	IC 2	Arth-Goldau towards Lugano
Lucerne Terminus	IR 70	Zürich HB Terminus
Rotkreuz towards Lucerne	IR 75	Baar towards Konstanz
Preceding station	Südostbahn	Following station
Zürich HB Terminus	IR 46	Arth-Goldau towards Locarno
Preceding station	Zurich S-Bahn	Following station
Terminus	S5	Steinhausen Rigiblick towards Pfäffikon SZ
Terminus	S24	Baar towards Thayngen or Weinfelden
Preceding station	Lucerne S-Bahn	Following station
Zug Schutzengel towards Sursee	S1	Baar Lindenpark towards Baar
Preceding station	Zug Stadtbahn	Following station
Zug Schutzengel towards Rotkreuz	S1	Baar Lindenpark towards Baar
Zug Postplatz towards Erstfeld	S2	Baar Lindenpark Terminus
Location
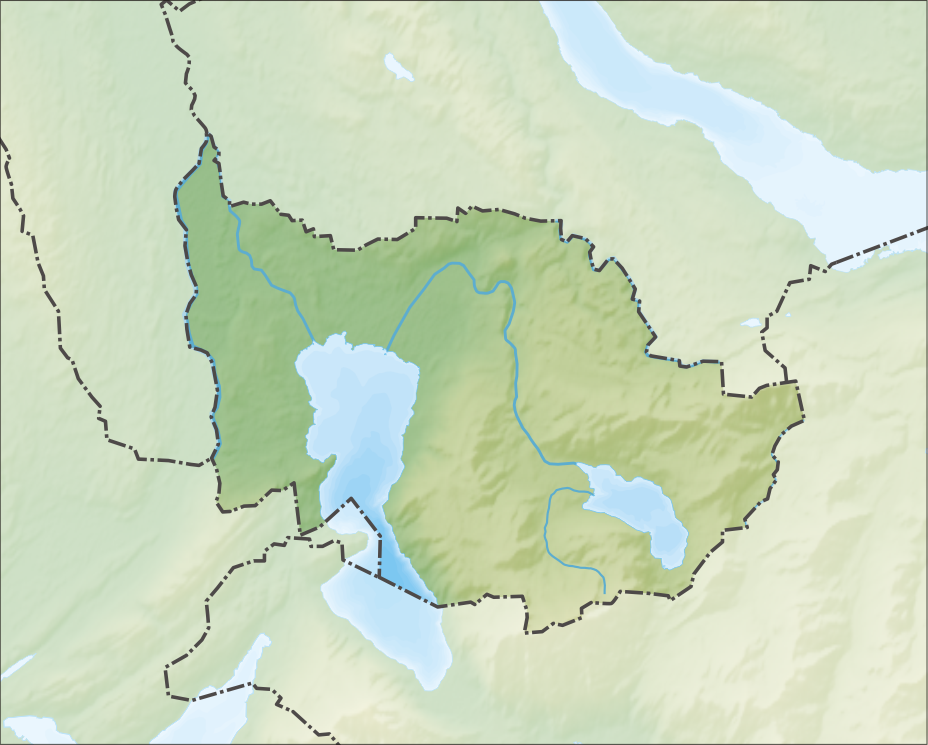
- Location within Switzerland Location within Canton of Zug

Zug railway station (German: Bahnhof Zug) serves the municipality of Zug, the capital city of the canton of Zug, Switzerland.

Opened in 1897, the station is owned and operated by Swiss Federal Railways (SBB CFF FFS). It is a keilbahnhof: it forms the junction between the Zürich–Lucerne railway and the Thalwil–Arth-Goldau railway, which connects with the Gotthard railway.

Every day, some 46,000 people pass through the station.

Zug is coincidentally the German word for "train".

== Location ==
Zug railway station is situated in Bahnhofplatz, right in the heart of the city centre, a short distance from the shore of Lake Zug.

== History ==
The first railway station in Zug was built in 1863-1864 by the architect Friedrich Jacob Wanner, in what is now the Bundesplatz. It was a terminal station, which could be reached only from the direction of Cham and Knonau. With an additional junction, trains could be turned. In 1897, as the railway lines to Zürich via Thalwil and to Arth-Goldau were opened, the station had to be moved to its current site. The original station building was dismantled and rebuilt in Zürich Wollishofen.

== Station building ==
Between 2001 and 2004, a redesigned station building was constructed at the station, at a cost of some 65 million Swiss francs. The building area is approximately 6500 m^{2}.

The redesigned building consists of a basement used for storage, one retail space at street level and another at platform level, and three floors of office space above. A total of 14 retail stores are located in the retail spaces. A new passage to the station entrance was specially built, so that pedestrians can reach the concourse more easily. Additionally, the separate Grafenau and Metalli quarters are now easier to reach. For the cyclists, new shelters were built. The newly created Bahnhofsplatz serves as a bus turning area. There are also internet connections, via wireless LAN, at certain locations within the station.

From the onset of dusk until 23:00 hours, the station building is illuminated by a light installation by artist James Turrell. For that purpose, the southern glass facade is equipped with fluorescent tubes, which are mounted so that the colors red, green and blue and resulting mixed colors can be created. As the control system of the light elements can suffer technical problems during long-lasting cold weather, the installation is shut down in such weather.

On 19 October 2005, the station received a Brunel Award for its architecture and light installation.

== Layout ==
The station has seven tracks, of which one is a terminating track, while the other six are through tracks. Altogether, there is a side platform and three island platforms, one of which is laid out in a wedge shape (tracks 3/4). One of the remaining island platforms is a partial side platform, due to the head track status of track 1.

Summary of track usage:

- Track 2: EuroCity/InterCity/InterRegio/Zug Stadtbahn S2 to Zürich Hauptbahnhof and Baar Lindenpark.
- Track 3: EuroCity/InterCity/InterRegio/Zug Stadtbahn S2 to Arth-Goldau, Erstfeld, and Ticino.
- Track 4: InterRegio/Lucerne S-Bahn S1/Zug Stadtbahn S1 to Rotkreuz, Lucerne, and Sursee.
- Track 5: InterRegio/Lucerne S-Bahn S1/Zug Stadtbahn S1 to Baar, Zürich Hauptbahnhof, and Konstanz.
- Track 6: Zürich S-Bahn S24 to Winterthur, Thayngen, and Weinfelden.
- Track 7: Zürich S-Bahn S5 to Pfäffikon SZ.

== Services ==
As of the December 2021 timetable change, the following services call at Zug:

- EuroCity: ten trains per day between Zürich HB and Bologna Centrale, Genova Piazza Principe, Milano Centrale, or Venezia Santa Lucia.
- InterCity:
  - service every two hours between Zürich Hauptbahnhof and Lugano.
- InterRegio:
  - service every two hours between Zürich HB and Locarno, via Göschenen.
  - service every hour between Zürich HB and Lucerne.
  - service every hour between Konstanz and Lucerne, via Zürich HB.
- Lucerne S-Bahn S1 / Zug Stadtbahn S1: service every 15 minutes between Rotkreuz and Baar, with every other train continuing from Rotkreuz to Sursee.
- Zug Stadtbahn S2: hourly service between Baar Lindenpark and Erstfeld.
- Zürich S-Bahn:
  - S5: half-hourly service to Pfäffikon SZ, via Affoltern am Albis and Zürich HB.
  - S24: half-hourly service to Winterthur, trains continue from Winterthur to either Thayngen or Weinfelden.

== Interchange ==
The station is the main hub of the Zug Stadtbahn, and is also part of the Zürich S-Bahn.

The Bahnhofplatz outside the station is a focal point of the extensive local public transport network of the Zugerland Verkehrsbetriebe (ZVB), which has 285 stops and a total route length of 197 km (122 mi).

== Social Attractions ==
Young locals regularly make use of Zug's railway station as a social meeting point. The stairs extending from platforms 4 and 5 act as a space within which individuals may convene. Proximity to shops, kiosks and food stores helps to improve the station's prominence amongst local youths, especially when considering the relatively high concentration of nearby amenities and parks. The Mr. Pickwick Pub located just south of the station is popular amongst both expats and locals alike; situated parallel to Alpenstrasse, the pub is easily accessible, making use of English-speaking employees as means to attract Zug's international community.

== See also ==
- History of rail transport in Switzerland
- Rail transport in Switzerland
