= Baar Lindenpark railway station =

Swiss railway station

Baar Lindenpark
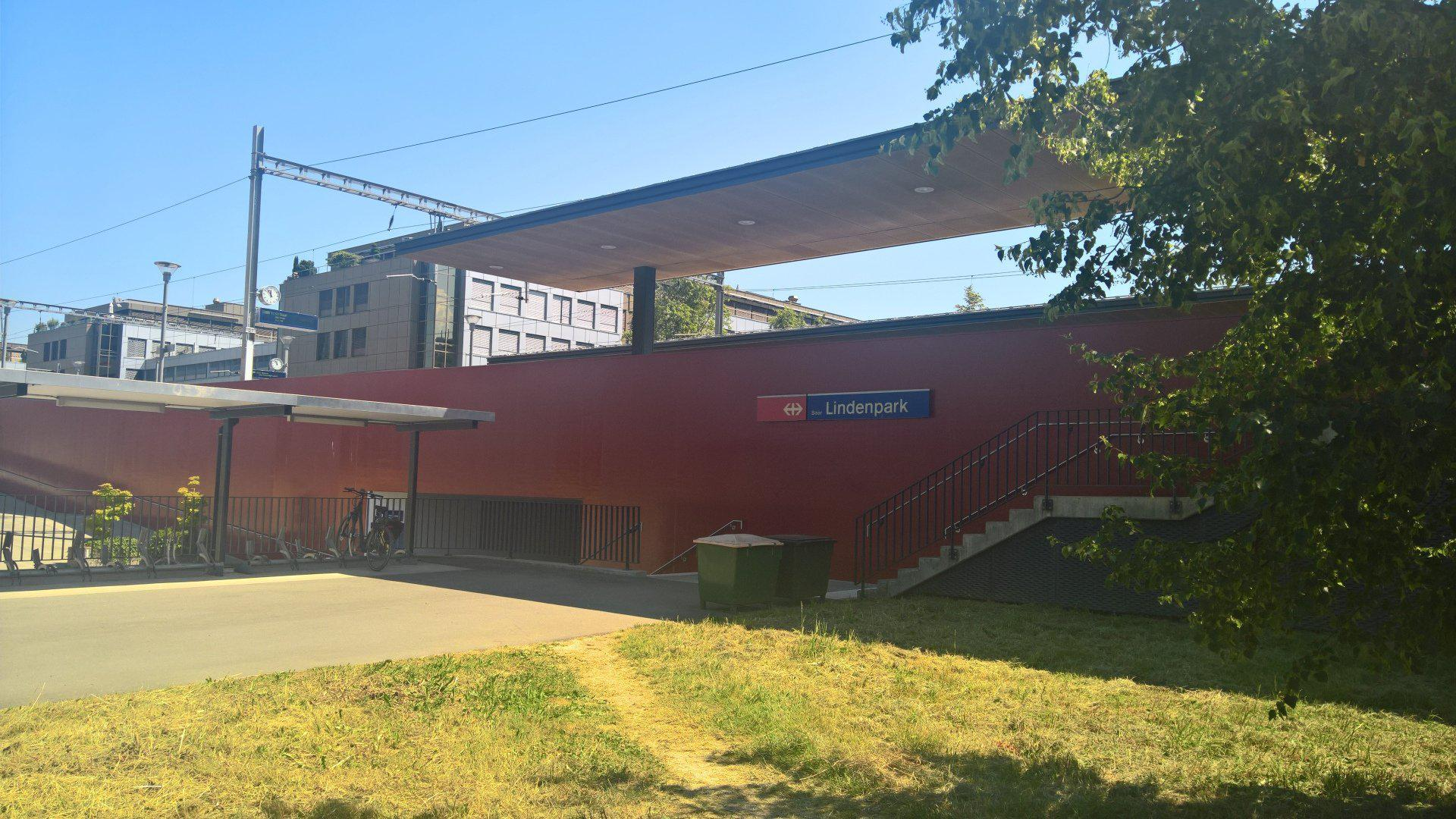
- The station platforms in 2018

General information
- Location: Baar; Switzerland
- Coordinates: 47°10′59″N 8°31′01″E
- Elevation: 428 m (1,404 ft)
- Owner: Swiss Federal Railways
- Line: Thalwil–Arth-Goldau line
- Distance: 28.2 km (17.5 mi) from Zürich HB
- Train operators: Swiss Federal Railways

Other information
- Fare zone: 610 and 623 (Tarifverbund Zug)

Passengers
- 2018: 1,700 per weekday

Services
Preceding station	Lucerne S-Bahn	Following station
Zug towards Sursee	S1	Baar Neufeld towards Baar
Preceding station	Zug Stadtbahn	Following station
Zug towards Rotkreuz	S1	Baar Neufeld towards Baar
Zug towards Erstfeld	S2	Terminus
Location

Baar Lindenpark railway station (German: Bahnhof Baar Lindenpark) is a railway station in the municipality of Baar, in the Swiss canton of Zug. It is an intermediate stop on the standard gauge Thalwil–Arth-Goldau line of Swiss Federal Railways.

== Services ==
As of the December 2020 timetable change, the following services stop at Baar Lindenpark:

- Lucerne S-Bahn S1/Zug Stadtbahn S1: service every fifteen minutes between Rotkreuz and Baar, with every other train continuing from Rotkreuz to Sursee.
- Zug Stadtbahn S2: hourly service to Erstfeld.
