= Thalwil–Arth-Goldau railway =

Swiss rail line

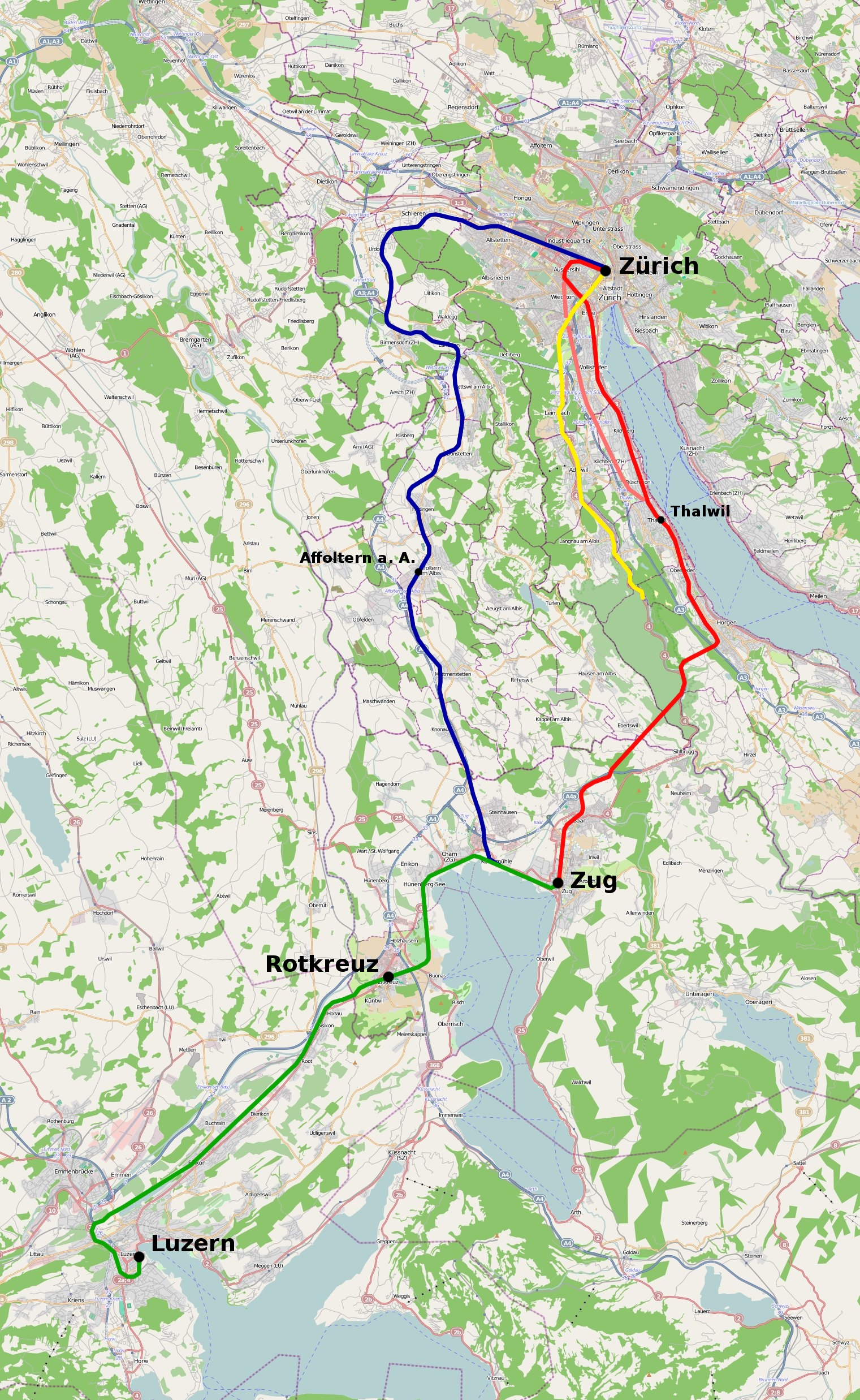
- (Zurich) Thalwil–Zug section shown in red but Zug–Arth-Goldau section not shown

Overview
- Line number: 600
- Locale: Switzerland
- Termini: Thalwil; Arth-Goldau

Technical
- Line length: 32.89 km (20.44 mi)
- Track gauge: 1,435 mm (4 ft 8 1/2 in)
- Electrification: 15 kV/16.7 Hz AC overhead catenary
- Maximum incline: 1.6%

The Thalwil–Arth-Goldau railway is a Swiss railway that acts as a feeder route to the Gotthard Railway (Gotthardbahn, GB). It was opened for this purpose on 1 June 1897, with the Thalwil–Zug section owned by the Swiss Northeastern Railway (Schweizerische Nordostbahn, NOB) and the Zug–Arth-Goldau section owned by the GB. Since the nationalisation of the GB in 1909, the entire route has belonged to the Swiss Federal Railways (Schweizerische Bundesbahnen, SBB).

The route is still partially single-track and therefore highly-subject to delays. In addition there is a danger of natural hazards, especially on the Zug–Arth-Goldau section, which as a result often has to be closed for several days.

== Route ==
The line begins in Thalwil, where it branches off from the Lake Zurich left bank line (Linksufrige Zürichseebahn). The double-track section has run steadily uphill to Horgen Oberdorf since the 1960s. After that, it passes under the Horgenberg through the 1985 metre-long, single-track Zimmerberg Tunnel. After the tunnel, the line crossed the Sihl on two tracks—with each on its own bridge—and reaches Sihlbrugg station, to which the Sihltal Railway was extended from Sihlwald and opened on the same day as the Thalwil–Arth-Goldau line. This is followed by the 3,359 metre-long, single-track Albis Tunnel and then the Litti operations yard, from where the line has run as a double track to Baar since 1979. It is crossed by the A4a motorway. The Lorze is crossed before Baar; the old, 96 metre-long bridge was replaced during the duplication of the line with a new 110 metre-long structure. A stress test was carried out on the newly built bridge with eight Ae 4/7 locomotives during the night from 28 to 29 March 1981. There have been two tracks between Baar and Zug since 1931.

The line was connected to the existing Zug station of the Zurich–Zug–Lucerne Railway (Zürich-Zug-Luzern-Bahn), which was operated by the NOB, requiring the station to be rebuilt. This created connections to the Zurich–Zug railway and the Zug–Lucerne railway.

Immediately after Zug station, the 255 metre-long viaduct follows Gotthardstrasse (Gotthard road), Baarerstrasse (Baar road) and Poststrasse (Post road) and the 585 metre-long Stadt (town) Tunnel. The halt of Zug Oberwil was upgraded to a station in 2010 to provide a second crossing point on the line. The line passes through the 36 metre-long Lotenbach Tunnel and the 90 metre-long Bühl Tunnel before Walchwil. For a long time, Walchwil station was the only place where trains could cross. As a rule, the regional trains (now line S2 of the Zug Stadtbahn) crossed with the oncoming Gotthard expresses. This is followed by the 48 metre-long Rossplatten Tunnel, the 94 metre-long St. Adrian Bridge, the 65 metre-long St. Adrian Tunnel, the 70 metre-long Rufibach Bridge and the 40 metre-long Rufibach Tunnel. Later, the 69 metre-long Kalkofen Tunnel and, shortly before Arth-Goldau, the 192 metre-long Mühlefluh Tunnel follow. Double track to Arth-Goldau station begins at the subsequent Goldau Mühlefluh operations yard. In Arth-Goldau station there is a connection to the Gotthard line of the SBB and the Pfäffikon SZ–Arth-Goldau railway of the SOB, as well as interchange with the Arth-Rigi Railway (Arth-Rigi-Bahn).

== Development between Zug and Arth-Goldau ==
In order to be able to achieve a half-hourly journey for express trains on the route from Zurich to Ticino, a second track has been built near Walchwil between June 2019 and December 2020. During the 1.5-year construction period, the line between Zug-Oberwil and Arth-Goldau has been completely closed. Regional traffic has been served by buses during this period, while long-distance trains was diverted via the western side of Lake Zug. The line re-opened for service with the December 2020 timetable change. Changes included 1.7 kilometres (1.1 mi) of double-tracking north of Walchwil and enlarging tunnels to allow double-decker trains.
