= Erstfeld railway station =

Railway station in Switzerland

Erstfeld
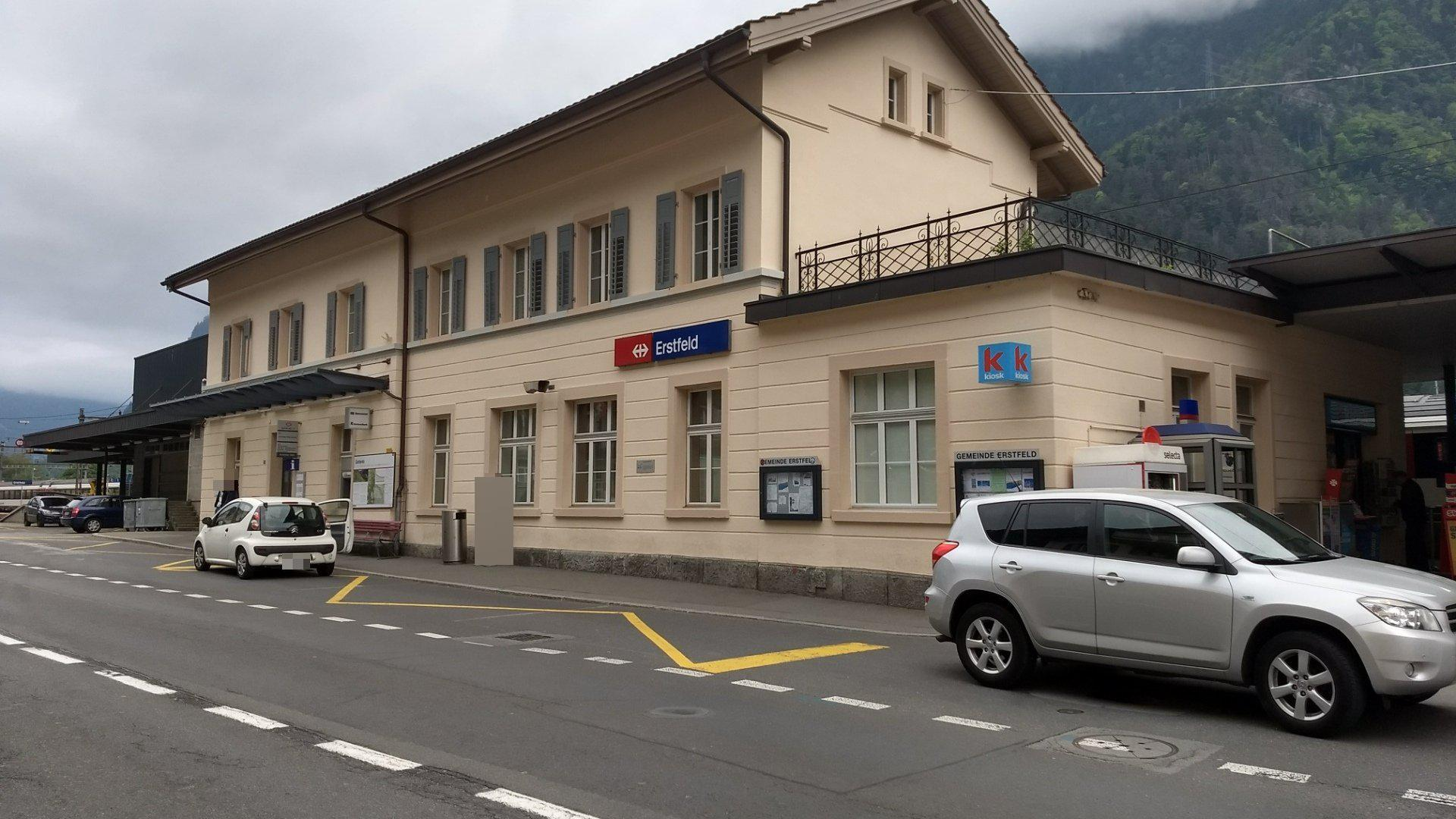
- The station building in 2018

General information
- Location: Erstfeld; Switzerland
- Coordinates: 46°49′13″N 8°39′02″E
- Elevation: 472 m (1,549 ft)
- Owner: Swiss Federal Railways
- Line: Gotthard line
- Distance: 41.6 km (25.8 mi) from Immensee
- Platforms: 2
- Tracks: 3
- Train operators: Südostbahn; Swiss Federal Railways
- Connections: Auto AG Uri bus lines

Passengers
- 2018: 2,300 per weekday

Services
Preceding station	Südostbahn	Following station
Altdorf towards Basel SBB	IR 26	Göschenen towards Locarno
Altdorf towards Zürich HB	IR 46	Göschenen towards Locarno
Preceding station	Zug Stadtbahn	Following station
Altdorf towards Baar Lindenpark	S2	Terminus
Location

Erstfeld railway station (German: Bahnhof Erstfeld) is a railway station in the Swiss canton of Uri and municipality of Erstfeld. The station is situated on the original line of the Gotthard railway, at the foot of the ramp up to the Gotthard Tunnel. The original line, and the newer line through the Gotthard Base Tunnel meet at a junction some 1.5 kilometres (0.93 mi) north of, and downhill from, Erstfield station. Most trains on the Gotthard route now use the base tunnel and therefore do not pass through the station.

A motive power depot at Erstfeld station houses rolling stock needed for the Gotthard route, and especially for banking service. A Ce 6/8 "crocodile" serves as a memorial for the legendary Gotthard locomotives.

== Layout ==
Erstfeld has a side platform with a single track (No. 1) and an island platform with two tracks (Nos. 2 and 4).

== Services ==
As of the December 2020 timetable change, the following services stop at Erstfeld:

- InterRegio: hourly service between Locarno and Arth-Goldau; trains continue to Basel SBB or Zürich Hauptbahnhof.
- Zug Stadtbahn S2: hourly service to Baar Lindenpark.
