= Zug Stadtbahn =

Transportation network in Switzerland

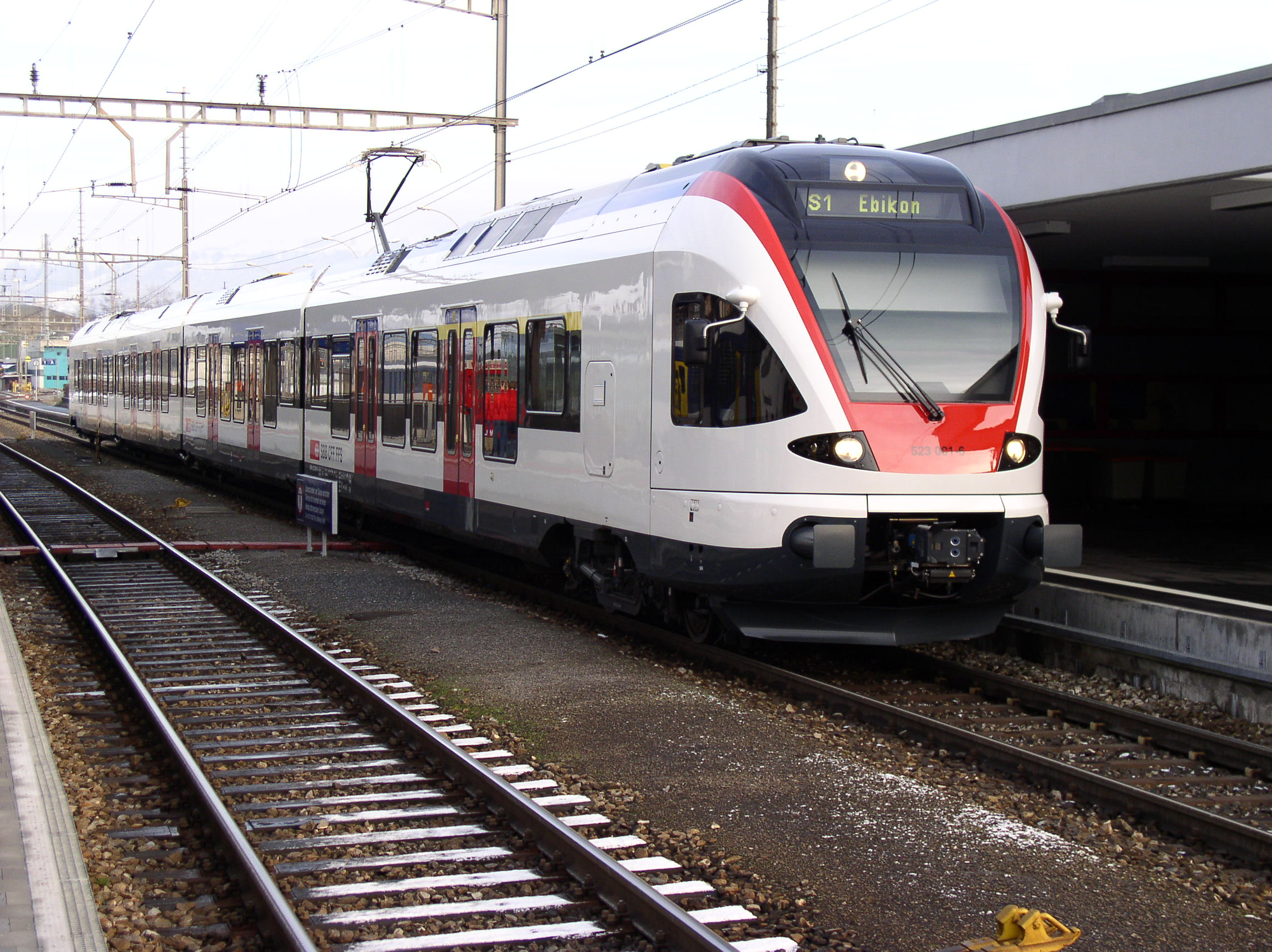
- An Ebikon-bound S1 train.

Overview
- Locale: Zug, Switzerland
- Transit type: S-Bahn
- Number of lines: 2
- Website: Stadtbahn Zug (in German)

Operation
- Operator: SBB-CFF-FFS

Technical
- Track gauge: 1,435 mm (4 ft 8 1/2 in) standard gauge

The Zug Stadtbahn (German: Stadtbahn Zug) is an S-Bahn-style commuter rail network centred on Zug, Switzerland.

Opened on 12 December 2004, the network forms part of the Central Switzerland S-Bahn project (German: S-Bahn Zentralschweiz), which also includes the Lucerne S-Bahn (German: S-Bahn Luzern).

== Lines ==
As of 2019, the network consisted of the following lines:

- S1 Baar–Zug–Cham–Rotkreuz–(Luzern) (also S1 of the Lucerne S-Bahn)
- S2 Baar Lindenpark–Zug–Walchwil–Arth-Goldau–(Erstfeld)

Reconstruction of the railway line on the east side of Lake Zug led to the suspension of the S2 between Zug Oberwil and Arth-Goldau beginning on June 9, 2019. S2 services from Erstfeld will operate to Rotkreuz. S2 service was suspended altogether on 9 April 2020.

== Rolling stock ==
The trains acquired by the SBB-CFF-FFS to operate the S1 services on the Zug Stadtbahn are SBB-CFF-FFS RABe 523 class electric multiple units. However, when the S1 was opened in 2004, there were not enough of these trains available to provide a full service, so they were supplemented by a Neuer Pendelzug (New Commuter Train) (NPZ), consisting of an SBB-CFF-FFS RBDe 560 hauling a B (second class car) owned by Thurbo as a Mittelwagen (intermediate car) and an NPZ Bt as a Steuerwagen (control car/cab car/driving trailer).

Additionally, Basel Regional S-Bahn trains were used to operate some services in 2008.

Since December 2008, all Zug Stadtbahn services have been operated by a fleet of twelve RABe 523s.

== See also ==
- Transport in Zug
