= Helen Keiser =

Swiss writer, painter, and photographer (1926–2013)

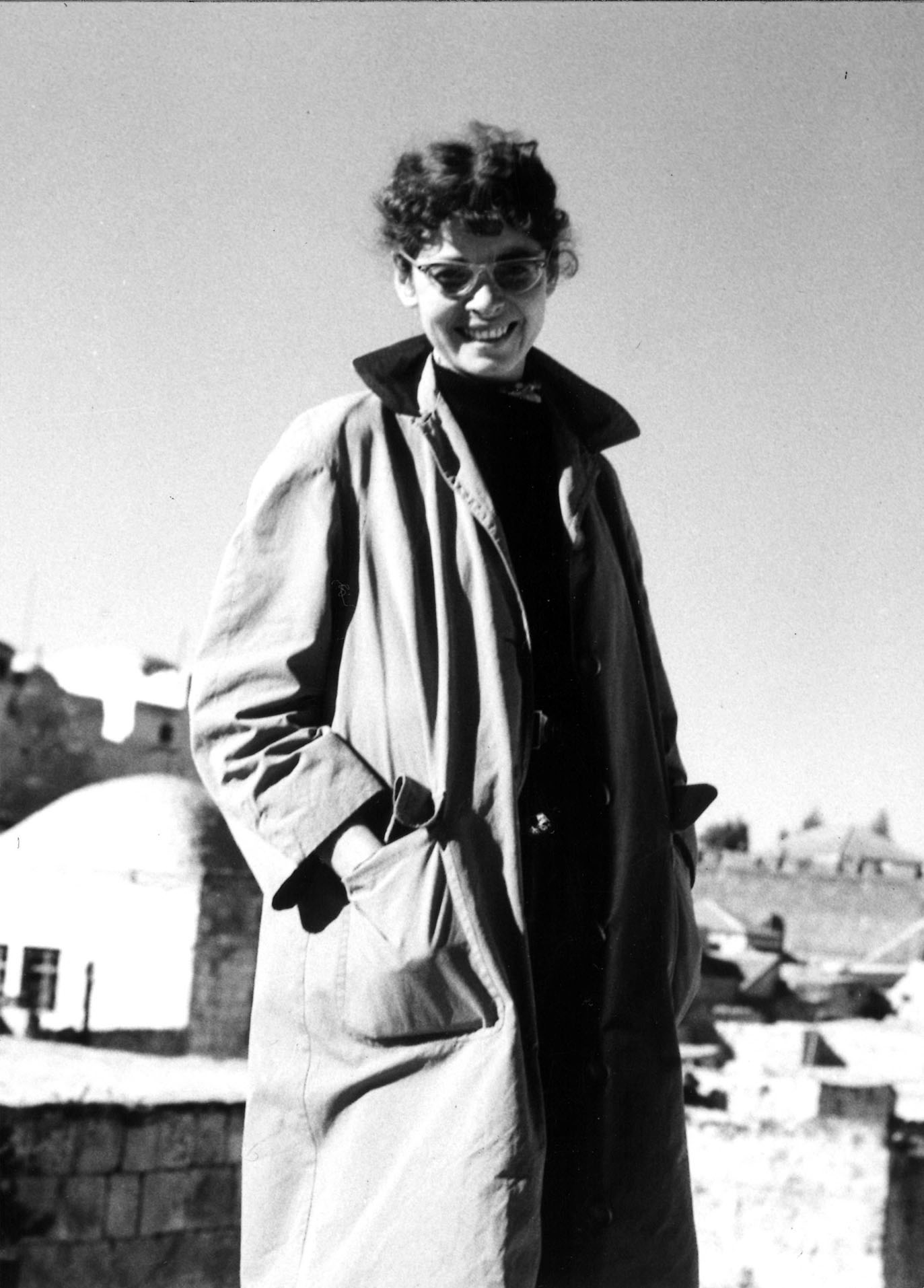
Helen Keiser in Syria, 1958

Helen Keiser (27 August 1926 in Zug – 20 December 2013 in Zug) was a Swiss writer, painter and photographer. Between 1950 and 1990, she travelled to all Arab countries and had the reputation in the 1970s and 1980s as one of the most profound experts on the region.

== Life ==
Helen Keiser was the daughter of a teacher who took her on mountain tours and river trips at an early age. After finishing school in Zug, she attended the Zurich School of Art and Crafts in the early 1940s and completed various internships as a graphic designer and decorator. An art historical study tour of the école du Louvre in Paris in 1952, which led to Greece, Turkey, Lebanon and Syria, was pathbreaking for her.

In 1954, Helen Keiser travelled with her friend Margarit in the footsteps of Sven Hedin’s "Overland to India" and spent twelve months in Lebanon, Syria, Iraq, Iran, Pakistan, Afghanistan, India and Sri Lanka.

In the mid-1950s, she worked as a journalist for various magazines. In 1956, she travelled to Morocco and in 1957 wrote the first of 13 books entitled "Salaam. Logbook of a voyage to the Orient". The fee motivated her to become a writer. As an independent author and journalist, she subsequently led a meager life. In 1957, Keiser studied archaeology in London, the next year she sailed to Corsica and a month wandered through the island.

Further journeys followed, including to Lebanon, Syria and Iraq, where Keiser made her first contacts with archaeologists in the south and visited the ruins of Ur, Uruk, Nippur and Babylon. The Orient increasingly became her destiny, and writing and painting became a necessity for her. While travelling in the Orient, she encountered surprising helpfulness and hospitality. This also applied to her as a woman, who was not only treated with respect, but who, as a solo traveller, was also given the kind of hospitality that was otherwise reserved for men.

Keiser experienced sandstorms, droughts and raids, but also saw the hard lot of the fellahs, who cultivated their barren fields with the most primitive means. As a woman, she was also able to gain insights into the everyday lives of women and girls that a man would never have been able to experience. On long camel rides in the desert, she won the friendship and trust of the Bedouins, and months of journeys turned into years.

In 1959, Keiser went to Damascus to study languages and then spent several months in Jordan, where she was received by King Hussain and visited the ancient Nabataean City Petra. It was in the kingdom's refugee camps that she first encountered the issue of Palestine, a contact that she deepened on subsequent visits and which, years later, after the Six-Day-War of 1967, led to the book "Do Not Cross the Jordan. The Fate of Palestine".

In 1961, Keiser's second book "Vagabond in the Orient" was published. From 1962 onwards, she went on lecture tours to Germany, Austria and Switzerland twice a year for the next 26 years. She wrote reports on history, archaeology and customs of the Orient, which appeared in magazines such as DU and Atlantis. She also organized her first solo exhibitions as a painter.

In the 1960s and 1970s, Keiser travelled again in North Yemen, in Hadhramaut, in Saudi Arabia, where she was received as a guest of the country by King Faisal, in Iraq, where she took part in excavations in Mesopotamia, again in Jordan and Israel, in Kuwait, Egypt and Syria.

In 1983, she received the Canton Zug's Recognition Award for her contribution to international understanding. In 1995, she ended her work as a publicist with the book "The Oasis". In 1998, a video portrait by Christoph Kühn was released: “Salaam. Helen Keiser – Nomad from the Occident.” In 2002, the Ethnological Museum of the University of Zurich took over a part of Keiser's photographic work. In 2003, she exhibited her watercolours and acrylic pictures for the last time in Zug. In the same year, she travelled to Damascus, where the Syrian National Museum showed her photo exhibition "Salaam". In Syria, she also travelled to Palmyra. In 2004, Keiser's photo exhibition "Salaam" was shown in Sofia University and Plovdiv Art Galerie in Bulgaria. In 2007, she travelled to Bulgaria, where another book of hers was published.

In 2016, Keiser's watercolours and acrylic paintings were on display in Zug's Old Town Hall. The exhibition was called "The Dream of Peace".

== Achievements ==
The Neue Zuger Zeitung reported, "Helen Keiser has travelled, gotten to know and explored the Arab countries from Lebanon and Syria to Saudi Arabia, Oman and Yemen for more than four decades. She passionately and tirelessly pleads for understanding and respect between the Orient and the Occident. In her books, Helen Keiser repeatedly describes the change of entire societies and the abandonment of ancient traditions in favour of a modern, western standard of living. Her literary work and the articles that Helen Keiser has written over a good 50 years, as well as the numerous lectures that she also has given beyond the Switzerland’s borders, represent documents that are of particular value as a contemporary historical source".

== Exhibitions ==
- Watercolors and oil pastels, gallery unknown, Zug, 1958
- Watercolors and oil chalk paintings, Gallery unknown, Zug, 1968
- Watercolors, Gallery unknown, Zug, 1975
- Watercolors and acrylic paintings, Galerie Goldgasse, Zug, 1981
- Acrylic Paintings, Galerie Kolin, Zug, 1985
- Watercolors, Reto Locher, Hausen a. Albis, 1991
- Watercolors and acrylic paintings, Galerie zur Münz, Zug, 1997
- Watercolors and acrylic paintings, Galerie zur Münz, Zug, 2003
- Watercolors and acrylic paintings, Altstadthalle, Zug, 2016
- Photo exhibition Salaam – Der fotografische Schatz von Helen Keiser aus dem verschwundenen Arabien
  - 2002: Altstadthalle, Zug; Galerie Schmukuku, Zug; Helferei, Zürich
  - 2003: National Museum, Damascus
  - 2004: Biblioteca Cantonale, Bellinzona; Art Gallery Plowdiw, Sofia University

== Works ==
=== Photographs ===
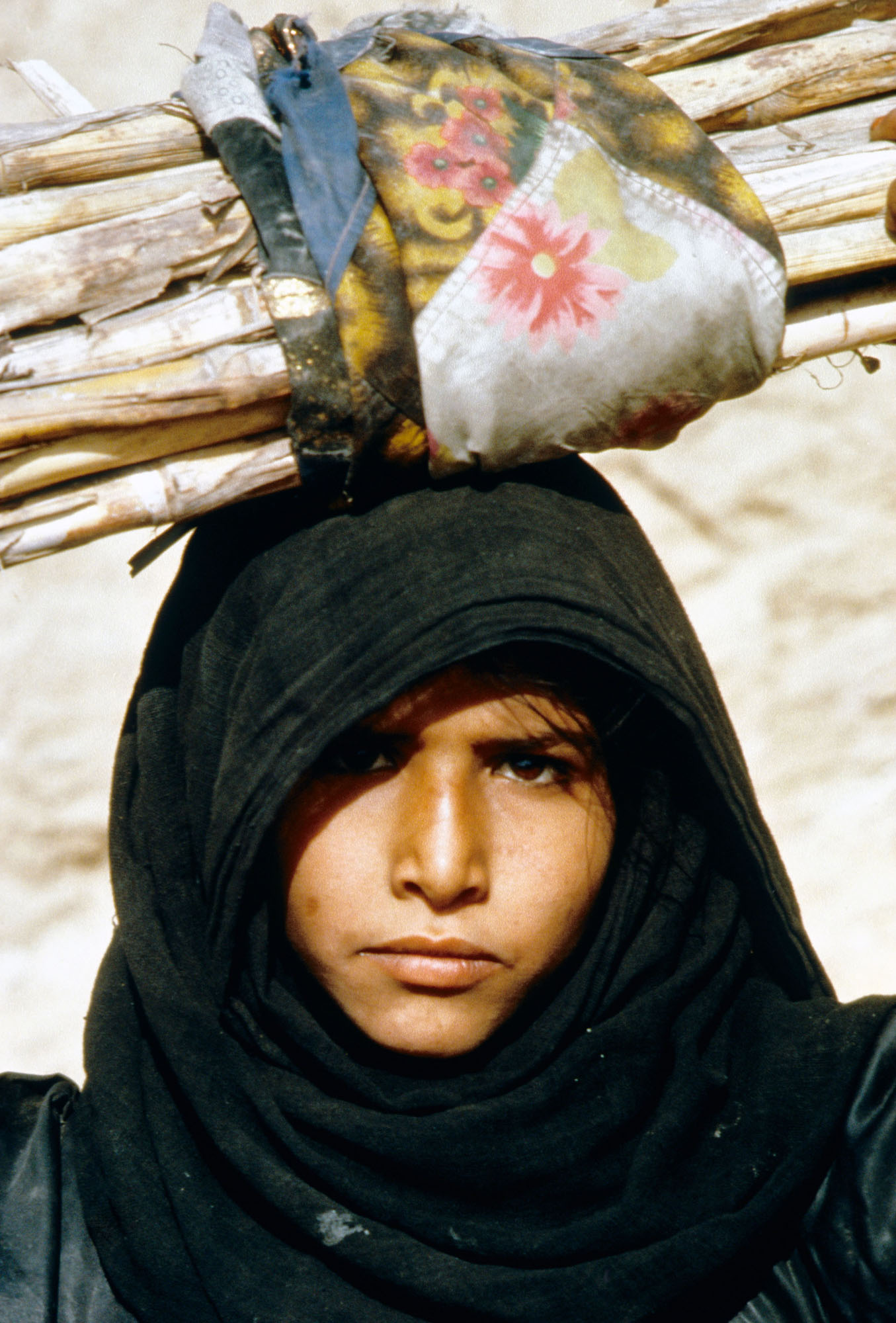
A Yemeni woman carries millet straw from the fields to the village. Yemen, 1972

The Ethnological Museum Zurich owns a part of Helen Keiser's photographic works.

=== Books ===
- Salaam. Bordbuch einer Orientfahrt. Illustrationen und Fotos von Helen Keiser. Schweizer Verlagshaus, Zürich 1958.
- Vagabund im Morgenland. Illustrationen und Fotos von Helen Keiser. Schweizer Verlagshaus, Zürich 1961.
- Sie kamen aus der Wüste. Mit Beduinen auf den Spuren der alten Nabatäer. Erlebnisse und Entdeckungen in Petra. Illustrationen und Fotos von Helen Keiser. Walter Verlag, Olten 1964.
- Die Stadt der Grossen Göttin. 4000 Jahre Uruk. Mit Archäologen zwischen Euphrat und Tigris. Fotos und Zeichnungen von Helen Keiser. Walter Verlag, Olten 1967.
- Arabia. Die Länder der arabischen Halbinsel. Fotos Helen Keiser. Silva Verlag, Zürich 1971.
- Geh nicht über den Jordan. Schicksal Palästina. Rex Verlag, Luzern 1971.
- Die kleine Beduinenfrau. Wege zwischen Wüste und Paradies. Rex Verlag, Luzern 1975.
- Abenteuer schwarzes Gold. Erlebnisse und Begegnungen in Saudi Arabien. Fotos Helen Keiser. Rex Verlag, Luzern 1977, ISBN 3725203032
- Die Söhne Nabayots. Beduinen, Forscher und Abenteurer in der Felsenstadt Petra. Walter-Verlag, Olten 1977.
- Suche nach Sindbad. Das Weihrauchland Oman und die altsüdarabischen Kulturen. Illustrationen und Fotos von Helen Keiser. Walter Verlag, 1979.
- Ruf des Muezzin. Eine schwierige Liebe zwischen Orient und Okzident. Rex Verlag, Luzern 1981.
- Sohn der Beduinin. Rex Verlag, Luzern 1983.
- Wolken über Korsika. Memoiren eines Eseltreibers. Rex Verlag, Luzern 1986, ISBN 3725204756.
- Die Oase. Verlag Giger & Kürz, Zug 1995.
- Der blaue Esel. Eine Bildergeschichte aus der Wüste. Bilder Helen Keiser. Verlag Helen Keiser, 1997.
- Salaam. Verschwundenes Arabien. Fotografien und Texte. Hrsg. von Christoph Kühn. Scheidegger & Spiess Verlag, Zürich 2002, ISBN 3-85881-139-4.

=== Pictures ===
Helen Keiser was keen to document her travels to be able to convey the magic of the Orient to those back home as unbroken as possible. Consequently, she not only took photographs and made notes but also drew and painted with watercolours. She always carried drawing paper and colours in her backpack, which weighed ten kilograms. Back in Zug, she created her pictures, first aquarelle, later with acrylic paints.

== Literature ==
- Schweizer Stiftung für Photographie (Hrsg.): Photographie in der Schweiz von 1840 bis heute. Benteli, Bern 1992.
- Arnold Hottinger: Die arabische Welt in Bildern. In: Helen Keiser: Salaam. Verschwundenes Arabien. Fotografien und Texte. Hrsg. von Christoph Kühn. Scheidegger & Spiess Verlag, Zürich 2002, ISBN 3-85881-139-4, S. 7–11.
- Christoph Kühn: Die einsame Wölfin – Helen Keiser: Reisende, Schriftstellerin, Fotografin und Malerin. In: Helen Keiser: Salaam. Verschwundenes Arabien. Fotografien und Texte. Hrsg. von Christoph Kühn. Scheidegger & Spiess Verlag, Zürich 2002, ISBN 3-85881-139-4.
- Christoph Kühn: Bilder und Begegnungen. In: Gemeinnützige Gesellschaft des Kantons Zug (Hrsg.): Grenzen. Zuger Neujahrsblatt 2002. Kalt-Zehnder-Druck, Zug 2001, ISBN 3-85761-278-9.
- Lehrmittel der interkantonalen Lehrmittelzentrale (Hrsg.): Zeit. Helen Keiser. In: Welt der Wörter. Band 2, Lehrmittelverlag des Kantons Zürich, 1984.
- Markus Schürpf: Zug im Bild. Streifzug durch 150 Jahre Zuger Fotografiegeschichte. In: Tugium. Nr. 28, 2012, S. 83–128.
- Herman Steiner (Hrsg.): Der Kanton Zug und seine Fotografen 1850–2000. Auch ein Stuck Kulturgeschichte. Zürcher Druck + Verlag AG, Rotkreuz 2000, ISBN 978-3-909287-20-8.
