= Michael Henss =

Swiss art historian

Michael Henss (born 1941) is a Swiss art historian, scholar and writer focussing on Asian art, especially that of Tibet and East Asia. He has written books, contributed articles for Asian art journals, and given seminars. Henss currently lives in Zürich, Switzerland, where he also runs a bookstore specializing in Asian and Near Eastern art.

In 2004–2005, Henss was co-curator of the exhibition "The Dalai Lamas" at the Ethnographic Museum of the University of Zurich.

== Works ==
Source: Works by and about Michael Henss

- "Tibet. Die Kulturdenkmäler", Luzern 1981
- "Milarepa’s Tower: An Early Treasure of Tibetan Art and Architecture Rediscovered", in: Oriental Art 2/1997, pp. 15–23
- "Kalachakra", Ulm 1998 (5th ed.)
- "The Qianlong Emperor as a Grand Lama". In: Asian Art Gallery, Nov. 1998.
- "Mustang", Ulm 1999 (3rd ed.)
- Preface to "The Buddhist Canon of Iconometry (Zaoxiang Liangdu Jing). With Supplement. A Tibetan-Chinese Translation from about 1742. Translated and annotated from this Chinese Translation into modern English" by mGon-po-skyabs, Jingfeng Cai (translator)
- Epilogue of "Alexandra David-Néel (1868-1969). Mythos und Wirklichkeit" by Peter Lindegger (preface), Philippe van Heurck, Jürgen Aschoff (editor), Sabine Seitzinger (translator)
- Translator of "Geheime Visionen. Frühe Malerei aus Zentraltibet" by Steven Kossak, Jane Casey Singer, Robert Bruce-Gardner, Michael Henss, Museum Rietberg, Zürich 1999 (2nd ed.)
- "The Cultural Monuments of Tibet: The Central Regions", Munich (forthcoming)
