= Lionel Donato =

Swiss footballer (born 1964)

Personal information
- Full name: Lionel Donato
- Date of birth: 17 June 1964 (age 62)
- Place of birth: Zug, Switzerland
- Height: 1.78 m (5 ft 10 in)
- Position: Centre-back

Senior career*
Years	Team	Apps	(Gls)
1984–1985	Montluçon		
1985–1986	Chamois Niortais	24	(0)
1986–1987	Louhans-Cuiseaux	8	(0)
1987–1988	Bourges	16	(0)
- * Club domestic league appearances and goals

Lionel Donato (born 17 June 1964) is a Swiss former professional footballer who played as a centre-back.
