= Béat Fidèle Antoine Jean Dominique de La Tour-Châtillon de Zurlauben =

Swiss mercenary and historian (1720–1799)

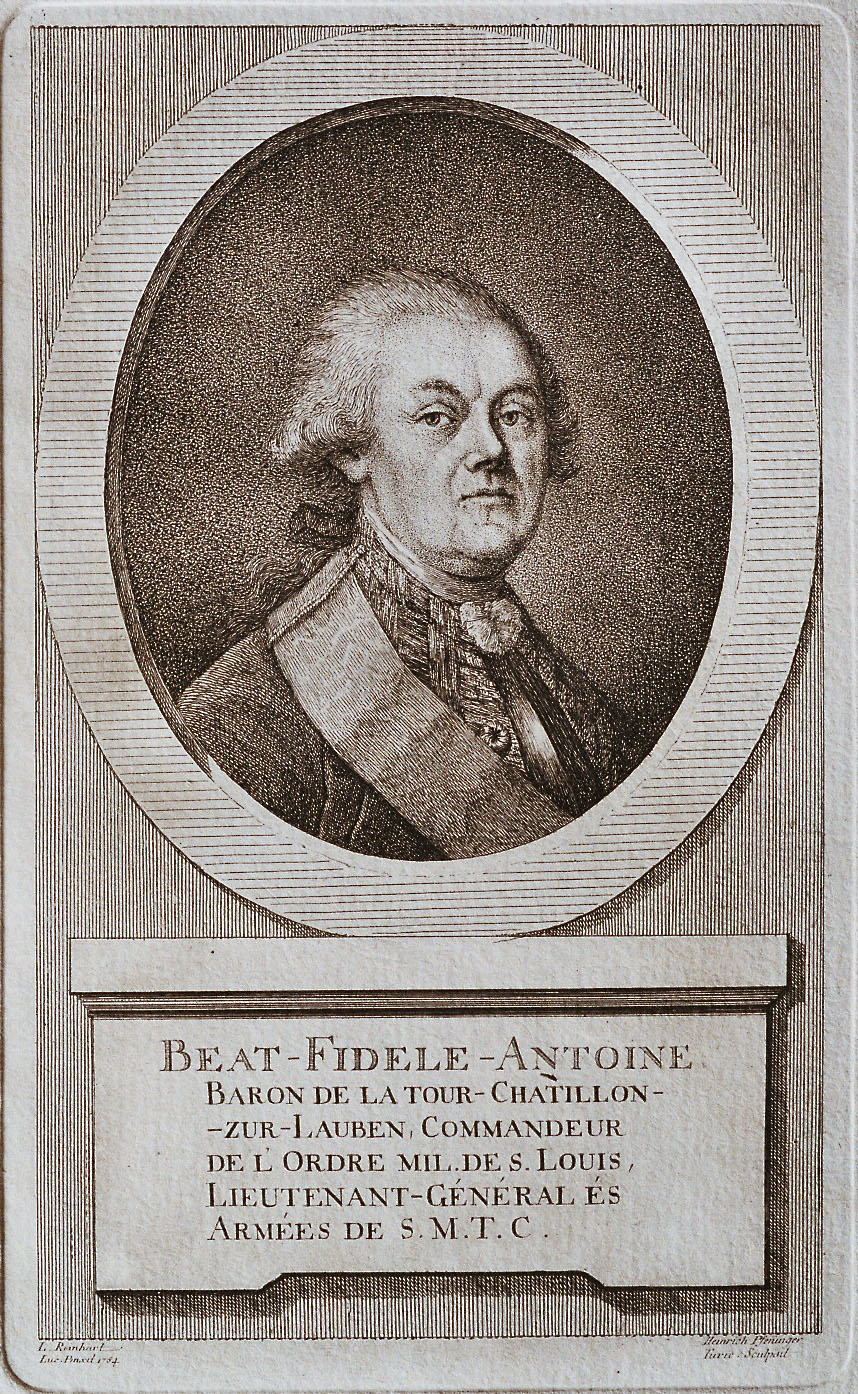
- Born: 4 August 1720; Zug, Switzerland
- Died: 13 March 1799 (aged 78); Zug, Switzerland
- Military career
- Allegiance: France
- Service years: 1735-1780
- Conflicts: Battle of Fontenoy
- Awards: Commander's Cross of Saint-Louis
- Other work: Military historian

Béat Fidèle Antoine Jean Dominique de La Tour-Châtillon de Zurlauben (3 August 1720 – 13 March 1799) was a Swiss mercenary and military historian.

== Biography ==
Zurlauben was born in Zug on 3 August 1720, the son of Beat Ludwig Zurlauben and Maria Anna Burtz von Seethal. With the support of his uncle, Beat Franz Plazidus, he received a solid education at Radolfzell, Mantes-la-Jolie, and finally at the Collège des Quatre-Nations in Paris from 1732 to 1737. Zurlauben entered French service as an ensign in 1735. In 1744, he was made captain of a company in the Swiss Guards that belonged to his uncle. Zurlauben was promoted to brigadier in 1748, to maréchal de camp in 1762, and to lieutenant-general in 1780, the same year he was granted a pension of 12,200 livres by France.

Zurlauben was appointed adviser, interpreter and secretary to King Louis XV in 1752. He tried in vain to become pension distributor for the town and bailiwick of Zug, and his attempt to gain a seat on the Council of Zug in 1756 also failed. In 1770, Zurlauben inherited the lordship of Anglikon and Hembrunn. In 1777, he became hereditary marshal of Muri Abbey. Zurlauben was an honorary associate of the Académie des inscriptions et belles-lettres from in 1749 and a member of the Helvetic Society and the Natural History Society of Zurich from 1762. He died in Zug on 13 March 1799, aged 78.

== Work ==
After retiring from the French Army, Zurlauben devoted himself to historical research. He wrote the eight-volume Histoire militaire des Suisses au service de la France (1751–1753), with the four supplementary volumes Code militaire des Suisses (1758–1764), and published the illustrated Tableaux topographiques, pittoresques, physiques, historiques, moralaux, politiques, littéraires, de la Suisse from 1780 to 1788. Zurlauben did preliminary work for his planned encyclopedia of Swiss nobility, Nobiliaire Suisse. He contributed articles and documents to the works of Philippe-André Grandidier, Gottlieb Emanuel von Haller, Johann Jacob Leu and Hans Jakob Holzhalb.
