= Zytturm, Zug =

13th-century tower in Zug, Switzerland,

Coordinates: 47.1661°N 8.5151°E

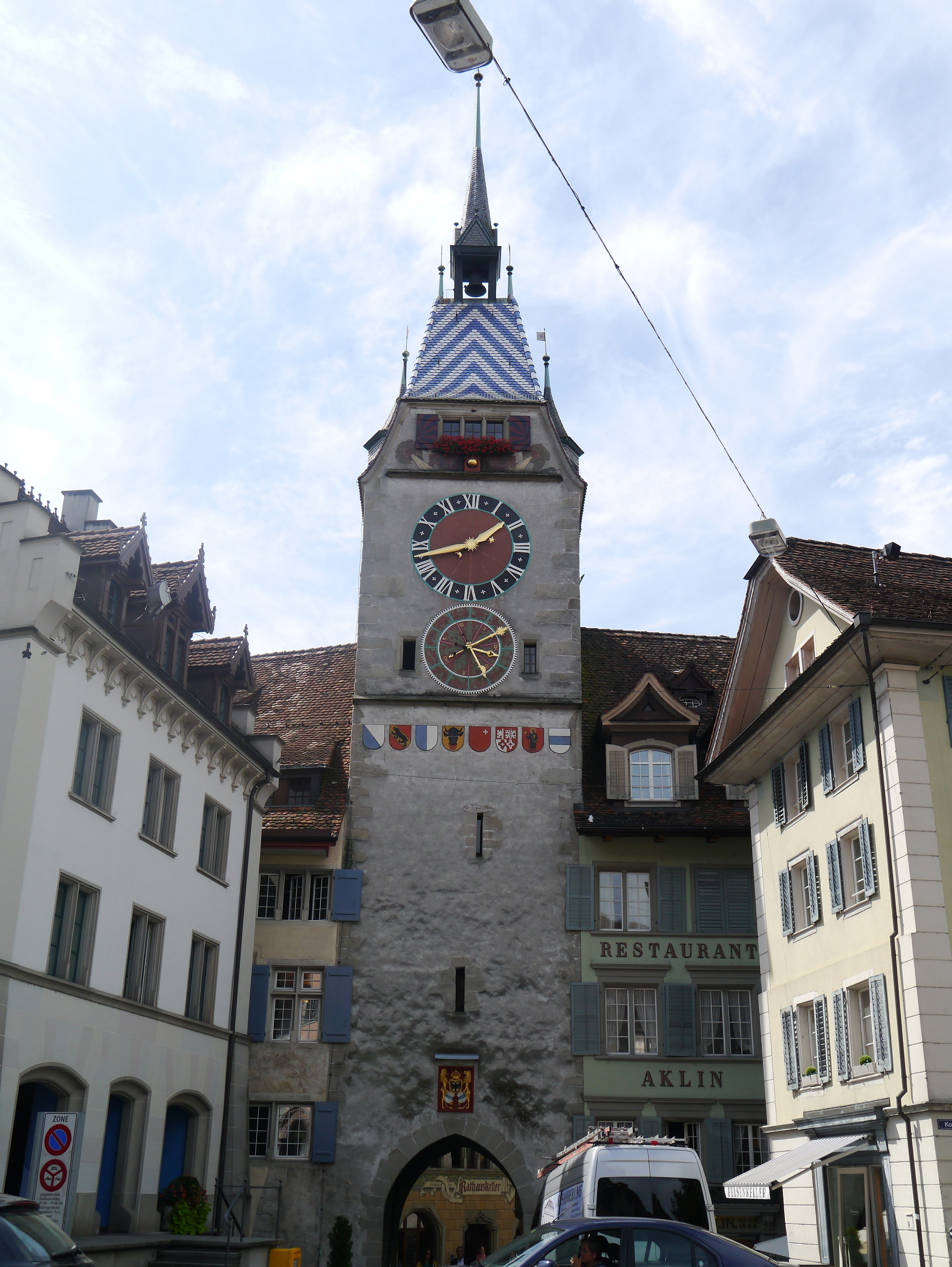
Zytturm, seen from Kolinplatz, Zug

The Zytturm is a 13th-century tower in Zug, Switzerland, which houses an astronomical clock. The tower, which is 52 metres high, is located on Kolinplatz in the old town centre.

The tower was constructed in the 13th century, then heightened between 1478 and 1480, taking its current form in 1557. The tower's last major renovation was in 1952. It is listed as being of National and Regional Significance, along with the city walls and other towers.

== Astronomical clock ==
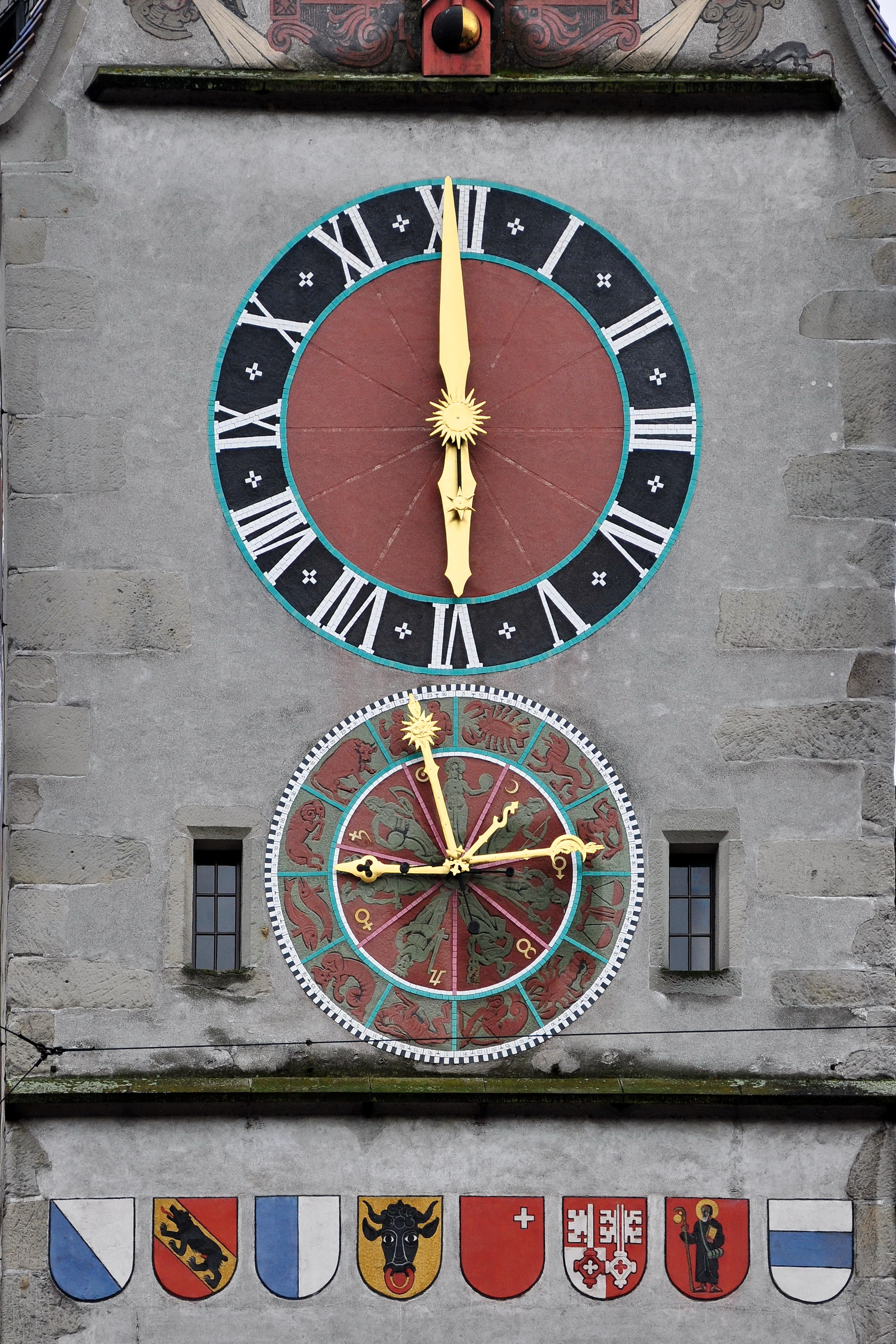
Astronomical clock, Zytturm

The astronomical clock on the eastern side of the tower was installed in 1574. Underneath the clockface, the calendar dial has four hands:

- The arrow indicates the day of the week on the inner ring of the dial, on which the days of the week are represented by their Germanic deities and astrological signs, with Sunday at the top. The arrow in the photo points to Venus/Friday.
- The crescent moon indicates the lunar phase, pointing upwards at the new moon and downwards at the full moon. The moon hand in the photo indicates a waxing quarter moon, matching the globe above the clock.
- The sun indicates the sign of the zodiac on the outer ring of the dial, starting with Capricorn at bottom (between 6 and 7 o'clock) for January. The sun hand in the photo points to Gemini/June.
- The S hand indicates the leap year (Schaltjahr in German), completing a cycle every four years, pointing downwards at the start of a leap year.

Above the clockface, a rotating gold and black globe indicates the phase of the moon.

== Canton shields ==
On the eastern side of the tower, below the clock, are displayed the coats of arms of the Old Eight Cantons which comprised the Old Swiss Confederacy from 1353 to 1481.
