= Zug =

City in Switzerland

- Municipality
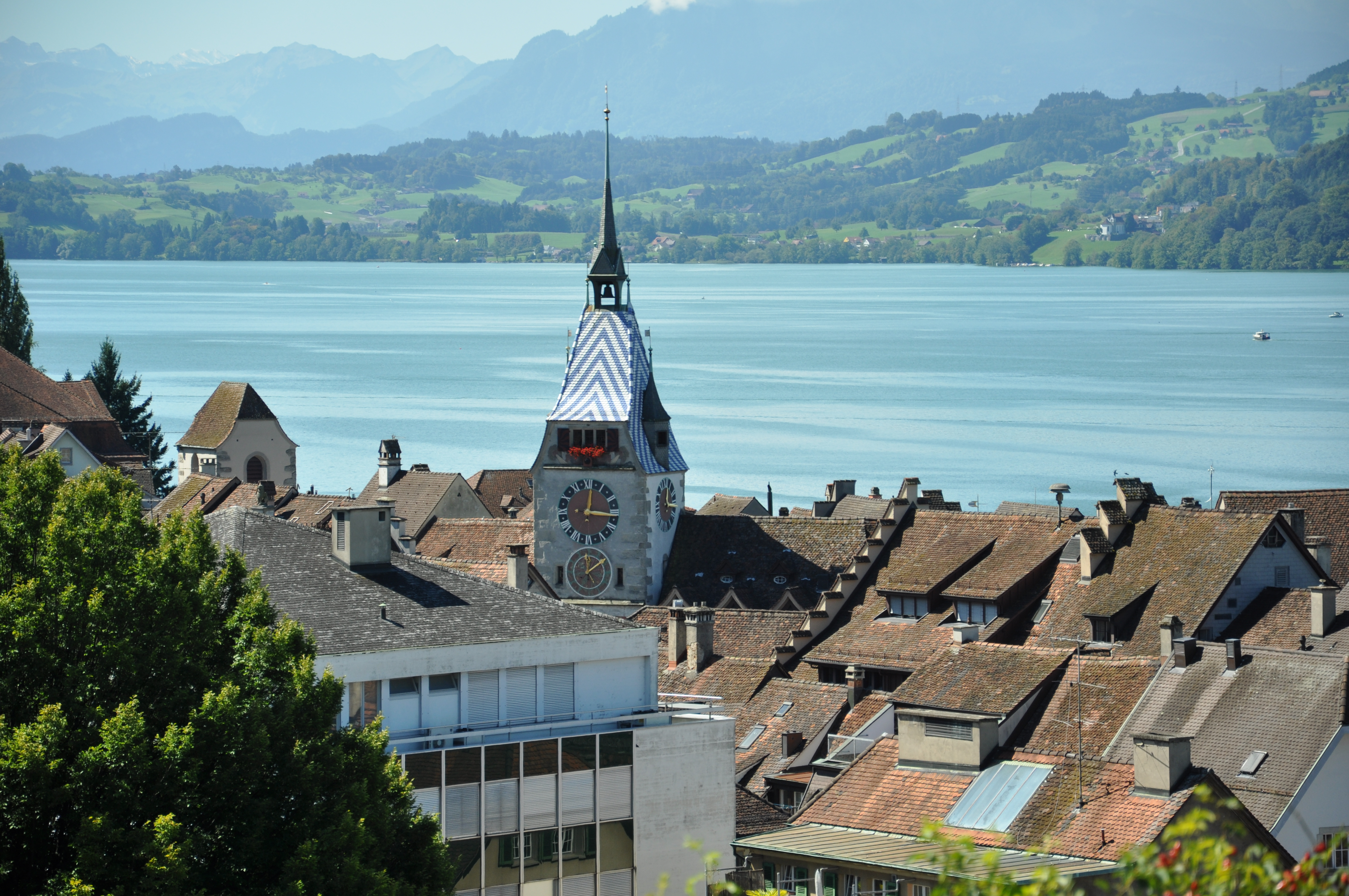
- View over Lake Zug with the old town of Zug and the Zytturm

- Flag Coat of arms
- Location of Zug
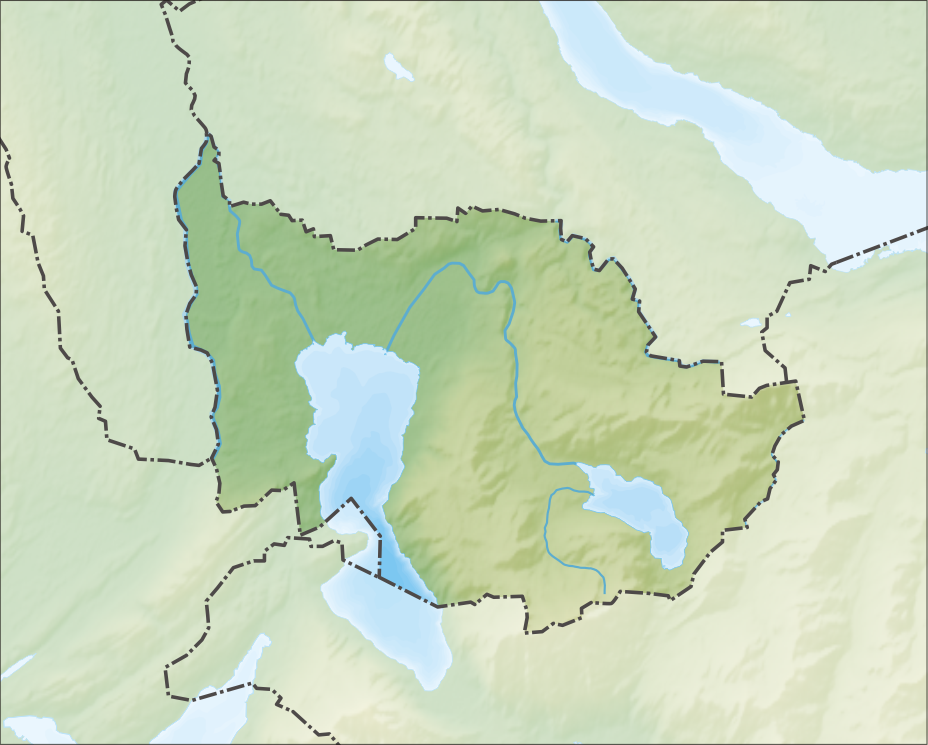
- Location within Switzerland Location within Canton of Zug
- Coordinates: 47°10′05″N 08°31′01″E
- Country: Switzerland
- Canton: Zug
- District: n.a.

Government
  - Executive: Stadtrat with 5 members
  - Mayor: Stadtpräsident (list); Karl Kobelt FDP/PRD (as of 2018)
  - Parliament: Grosser Gemeinderat with 40 members , instaured 1963)

Area
  - Total: 33.8 km^{2} (13.1 sq mi)
- Elevation (Landsgemeindeplatz): 425 m (1,394 ft)
- Highest elevation (Zugerberg): 1,039 m (3,409 ft)
- Lowest elevation (Sumpf (Dorfbach)): 415 m (1,362 ft)

Population (December 2020)
  - Total: 30,934
  - Density: 915/km^{2} (2,370/sq mi)
- Demonym: German: Zuger/Zugerin
- Time zone: UTC+01:00 (CET)
  - Summer (DST): UTC+02:00 (CEST)
- Postal code: 6300
- SFOS number: 1711
- ISO 3166 code: CH-ZG
- Surrounded by: Cham, Baar, Walchwil, Steinhausen, Unterägeri
- Twin towns: Fürstenfeld (Austria), Kalesija (Bosnia-Herzegowina), Vișeu de Sus (Romania)
- Website: stadtzug.ch

Zug (Standard German: [tsuːk], Alemannic German: [tsuːɡ̊]; French: Zoug; Italian: Zugo; Romansh: Zug; Neo-Latin: Tugium) (Note: Named in the 16th century.) is the largest town and capital of the Swiss canton of Zug. Zug is renowned as a hub for some of the wealthiest individuals in the world and is known for its high concentration of wealth.

The municipality had a total population of 30,934 on 31 December 2020.

== Etymology ==
Its name, translating from German as "pull" or "tug", originates from the fishing vocabulary; in the Middle Ages it referred to the right to pull up fishing nets and hence to the right to fish.

== History ==
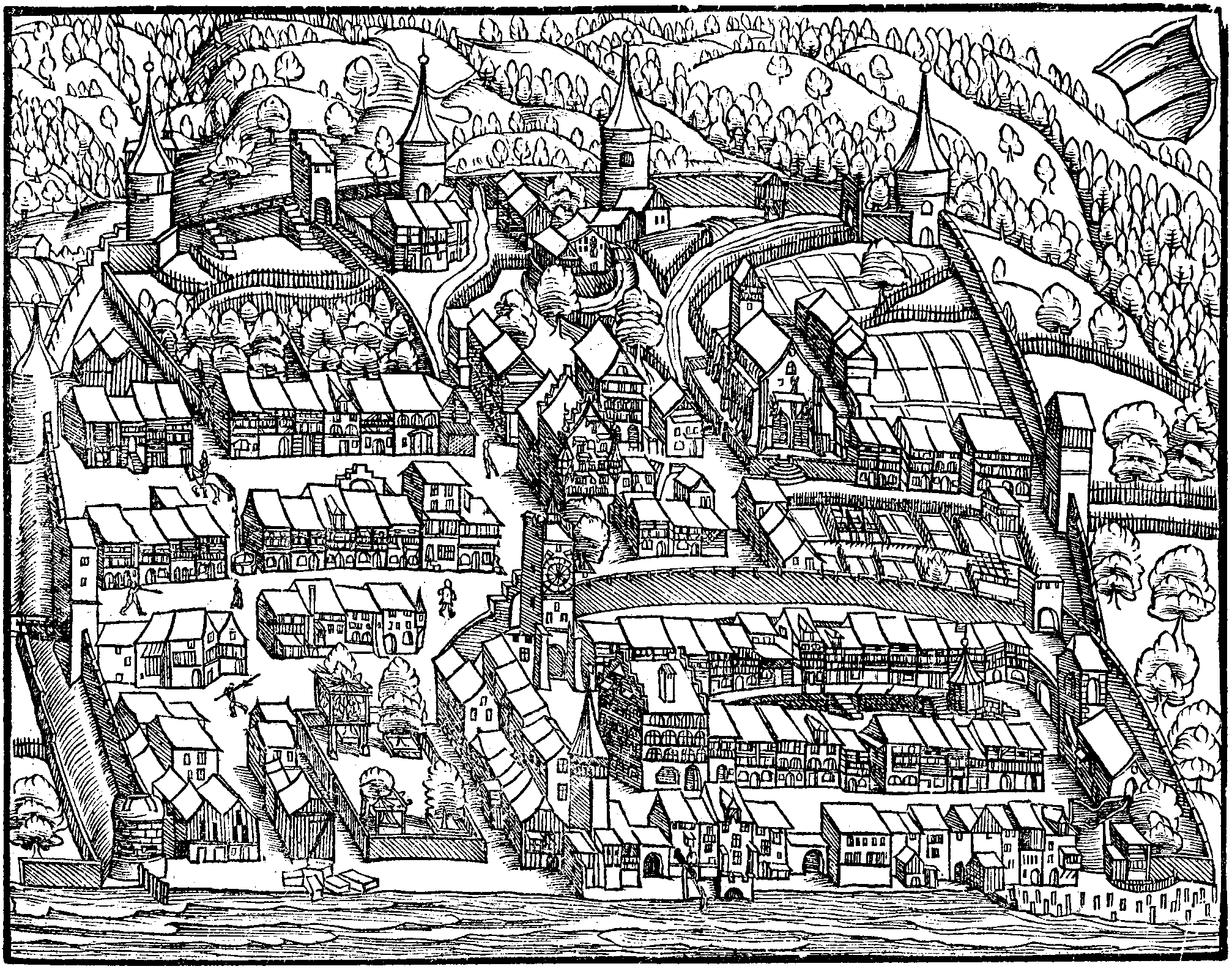
View of Zug before 1547

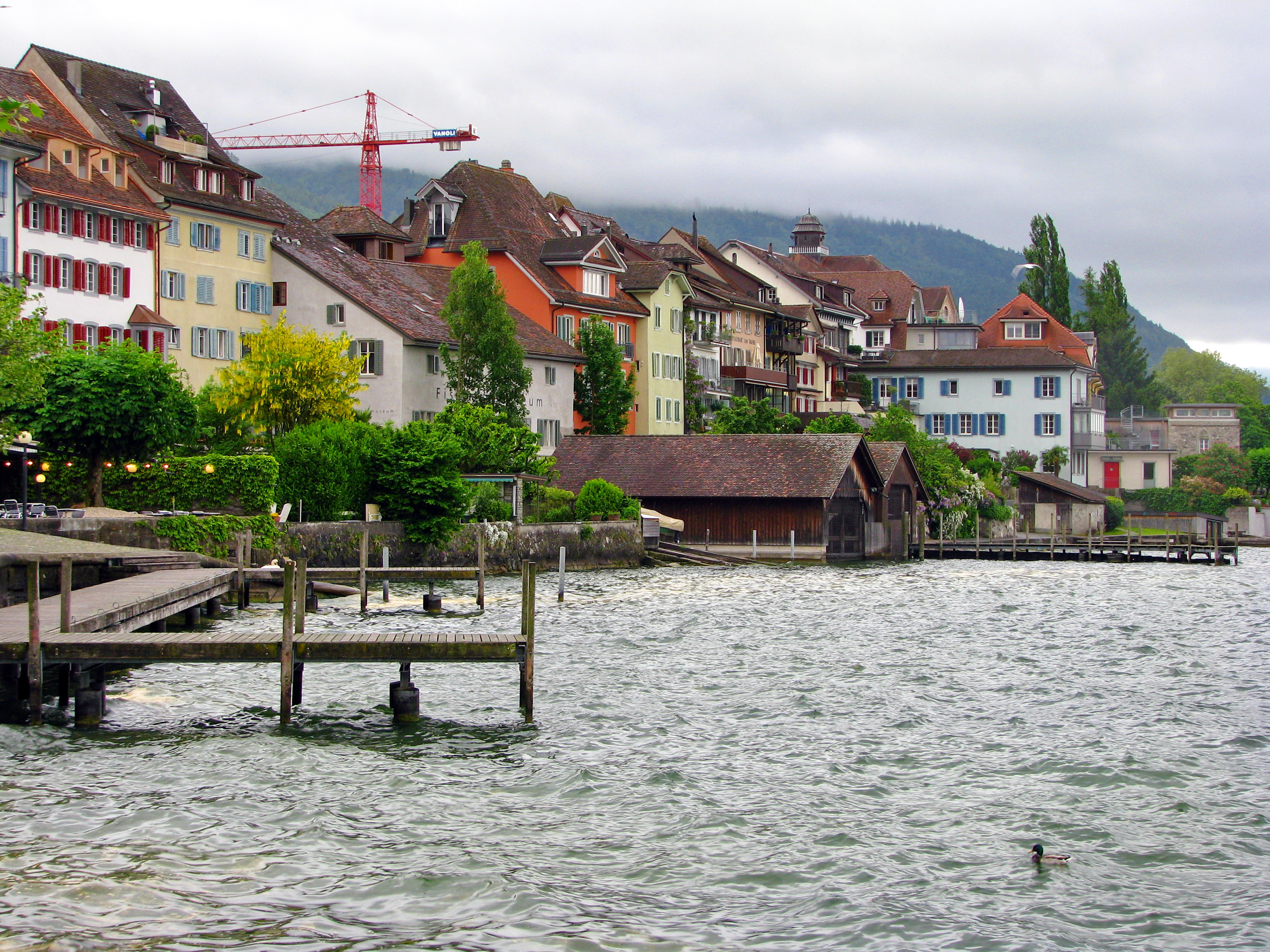
Unterstadt (lower town) as seen from Lake Zug harbour

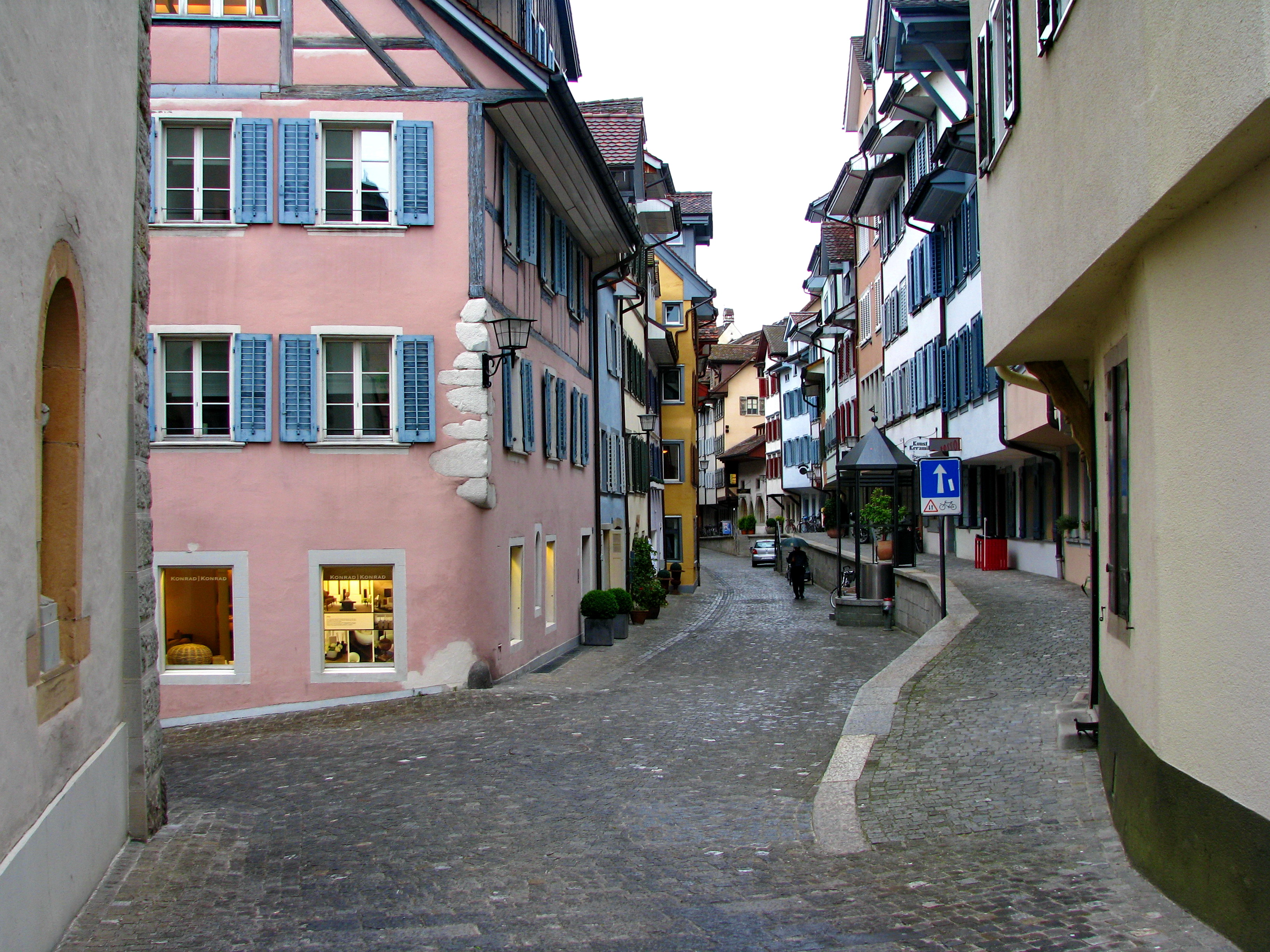
Oberstadt (upper town) in the Altstadt

=== Prehistory ===
The oldest evidence of humans in the area trace back to 14,000 BC. There have been Paleolithic finds on the north bank of Lake Zug, which come from nomadic hunters and gatherers. Archaeologists have also found over forty lake-shore settlements, known as pile dwellings, on the shores of Lake Zug from the epoch of the first settled farmers in the Neolithic period (5,500–2,200 BC). The peak in these lake-shore village settlements was between 3800 and 2450 BC. For the same epoch, the first pre-alpine land use has been found in Menzingen and in the Ägeri valley. The well-known, historically researched lake-shore village 'Sumpf' (the swamp), dated from the late Bronze Age (up until 850 BC). Evidence from these finds resulted in a quite different picture of life in former times, which is on display at the Zug Museum for Prehistory. In addition, finds from the Iron Age (850–50 BC) and the Roman and Celtic-Roman time (from 50 BC) have been unearthed.

=== Kyburg foundation ===
In around AD 600, Alemannic families and tribes migrated to the area of present-day canton Zug. The name Blickensdorf, and place names with '-ikon' endings, prove this as the first Alemannic living space. The churches of Baar and Risch also date back to the early Middle Ages. The first written document on the area originates from the year 858, and refers to King Ludwig the German giving the farm Chama (Cham) to the Zürich Fraumünster convent. At this time, the area of present-day Zug belonged to completely different monastic and secular landlords, the most important of whom were the Habsburgs, and who, in 1264, inherited the Kyburg rights and remained a central political power until about 1400.

In the course of the high medieval town construction, the settlement of Zug also received a town wall at some point after 1200. The town founders were probably the counts of Kyburg. The town, first mentioned in AD 1240, was called an "oppidum" in 1242 and a "castrum" in 1255. In 1273, it was bought by Rudolph of Habsburg from Anna, the heiress of Kyburg and wife of Eberhard, head of the cadet line of Habsburg. Through this purchase it passed into the control of the Habsburgs and was placed under a Habsburg bailiff. The Aeusser Amt or Outer District consisted of the villages and towns surrounding Zug, which each had their own Landsgemeinden but were ruled by a single Habsburg bailiff. Zug was important as an administrative center of the Kyburg and the Habsburg district, then as a local market place, and, thereafter, as a stage town for the transport of goods (particularly salt and iron) over the Hirzel hill towards Lucerne.

=== Joining the Swiss Confederation ===
On 27 June 1352, both the town of Zug and the Aeusser Amt entered the Swiss Confederation, the latter being received on exactly the same terms as the town, and not, as was usual in the case of outer districts, as a subject land. However, in September 1352, Zug had to acknowledge its own lords again, and in 1355 was obliged to break off its connection with the league. About 1364, the town and the Aeusser Amt were recovered for the league by the men of Schwyz, and from this time Zug took part as a full member in all the acts of the league. In 1379, the Holy Roman Emperor Wenceslaus exempted Zug from all external jurisdictions, and in 1389 the Habsburgs renounced their claims, reserving only an annual payment of 20 silver marks, which came to an end in 1415. In 1400 Wenceslaus gave all criminal jurisdiction to the town only. The Aeusser Amt, in 1404, then claimed that the banner and seal of Zug should be kept in one of the country districts and were supported in this claim by Schwyz. The matter was finally settled in 1412 by arbitration, and the banner was to be kept in the town. Finally in 1415, the right of electing their landammann was given to Zug by the Confederation, and a share in the criminal jurisdiction was granted to the Aeusser Amt by German king Sigismund.

The alliance of the four forest cantons of Uri, Schwyz, Unterwalden and Lucerne with the city of Zürich in 1351 set much in motion. The town of Zug was seen as having Habsburg ties with the cities of Zürich and Lucerne, and therefore had to be conquered. It is likely that this was more for political than economic reasons: the Lucerne market was very important for central Switzerland, but also strongly dependent on the city of Zürich. Zürich initiated a siege on Zug with the federal army in June 1352. Zug surrendered. On 27 June 1352 Zürich, Luzern, Zug, Uri, Schwyz and Unterwalden formed an alliance. Zürich's saw this 'Zugerbund' (Zug alliance) as an alliance of convenience. For the town of Zug, little changed, and Zug remained Habsburg. That same year, the Zug alliance was declared invalid by all parties. A period of Schwyz domination then followed. Only gradually did Zug become sovereign and federal.

Simultaneously, Zug expanded its territory, acquiring a number of rural areas in the form of bailiwicks (Walchwil, Cham, Gangolfswil [Risch] Hünenberg and Steinhausen, and Oberrüti, now part of the canton of Aargau). Zug became a confederation in itself – with the town and its subject territories, and the three outer ('free') municipalities, Ägeri, Menzingen (with Neuheim) and Baar. This problematic dualism dominated until 1798, i.e. until the end of the old confederation, the political structure of the Canton Zug. The unifying element of this miniature confederation was, among others, the rural municipalities and the forty-member city council.

=== Growth of the town ===
In 1385, Zug joined the league of the Swabian cities against Leopold III of Austria and shared in the victory of Sempach, as well as in the various Argovian (1415) and Thurgovian (1460) conquests of the Confederates, and later in those of Italy (1512), having already taken part in the occupation of the Val d'Ossola. Between 1379 (Walchwil) and 1477 (Cham), Zug had acquired various districts in its own neighborhood, principally to the north and the west, which were ruled till 1798 by the town alone as subject lands.

In 1478, the building of a larger town wall began, which increased the town area six-fold – the same year as the building of the late gothic St. Oswald Church began. The building master of the new town wall was Hans Felder from Bavarian Swabia. The ground plan of the town wall is indicative of an ideal symmetric plan of the Renaissance period – something very rare at that time. The overall urban planning implemented in the small town of Zug was modern for its time.

=== The Reformation and early modern era ===
During the turmoil of the Reformation, Zug remained on the Catholic side of central Switzerland and retained the old faith. Warring religious confederates fought at Kappel am Albis (1531) and at Gubel in Menzingen. Its location on the edge of central Switzerland made Zug a confessional border town. During the Reformation, Zug clung to the old faith and was a member of the Christliche Vereinigung of 1529. In 1586, it became a member of the Golden League.

The period up until 1798 was marked by internal political rivalries and turbulence. The invasion of the French troops marked the end of the old order, and with the Helvetic order came a radical political change. Zug became part of the canton Waldstätten, and the cantonal capital for a short time. After a 50-year struggle between federalism and centralism, between confederation and central state, between conservative and liberal-radical vision, in 1848, today's federal government of Switzerland emerged. Zug was given its current cantonal structure, consisting of eleven local municipalities.

=== Industrialisation and internationalisation ===
Aerial view by Walter Mittelholzer (1919)

Until well into the 19th century, Zug consisted of agricultural land. Actual industrialization began with the entrepreneur Wolfgang Henggeler, who in 1834 built a cotton mill in Unterägeri. This was followed by the two companies in Neuägeri and Baar. In 1866, the American George Ham Page founded the first European condensed milk factory in Cham, which later merged with Nestlé. Industry in Zug was dominated by the company Landis+Gyr, founded in 1896, and now owned by Toshiba. The connection to the Swiss railway network in 1864 was important, as was the connection of mountain and valley with an electric tram at the beginning of the 20th century.

In the second half of the 20th century, dynamic expansion took place and Zug became a national and international financial and trading centre, aided by its proximity to Zürich, and by an attractive tax policy. In parallel, large industrial and commercial zones evolved; employment increased rapidly; the population rose sharply, and the building boom skyrocketed. Canton Zug catapulted itself into being at the top of the financially strong cantons. And the town today has become, as the British Guardian once wrote, 'a compass of the global economy'.

=== Today ===
Zug is a low tax region and is headquarters for a number of multinational enterprises. The Expat City Ranking in 2019, based on a study of more than 20,000 respondents, rated the quality of life in Zug highest among all cities in the survey. The town's best-known agricultural product is Kirsch.

On 27 September 2001, a mentally-ill 57-year-old resident shot 32 people, killing 14 before killing himself in the cantonal parliament building (Parlamentsgebäude Zug).

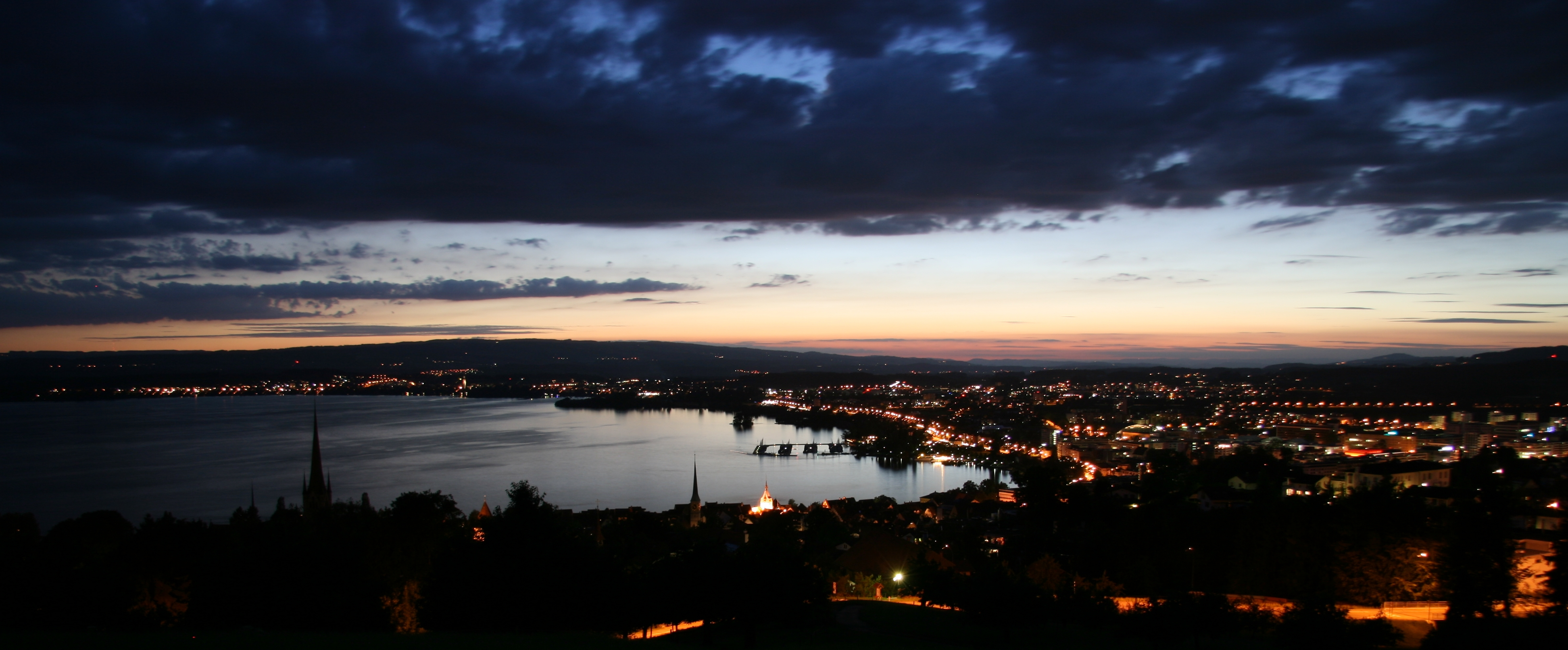
Night view of Zug and its lake

== Geography ==
=== Topography ===
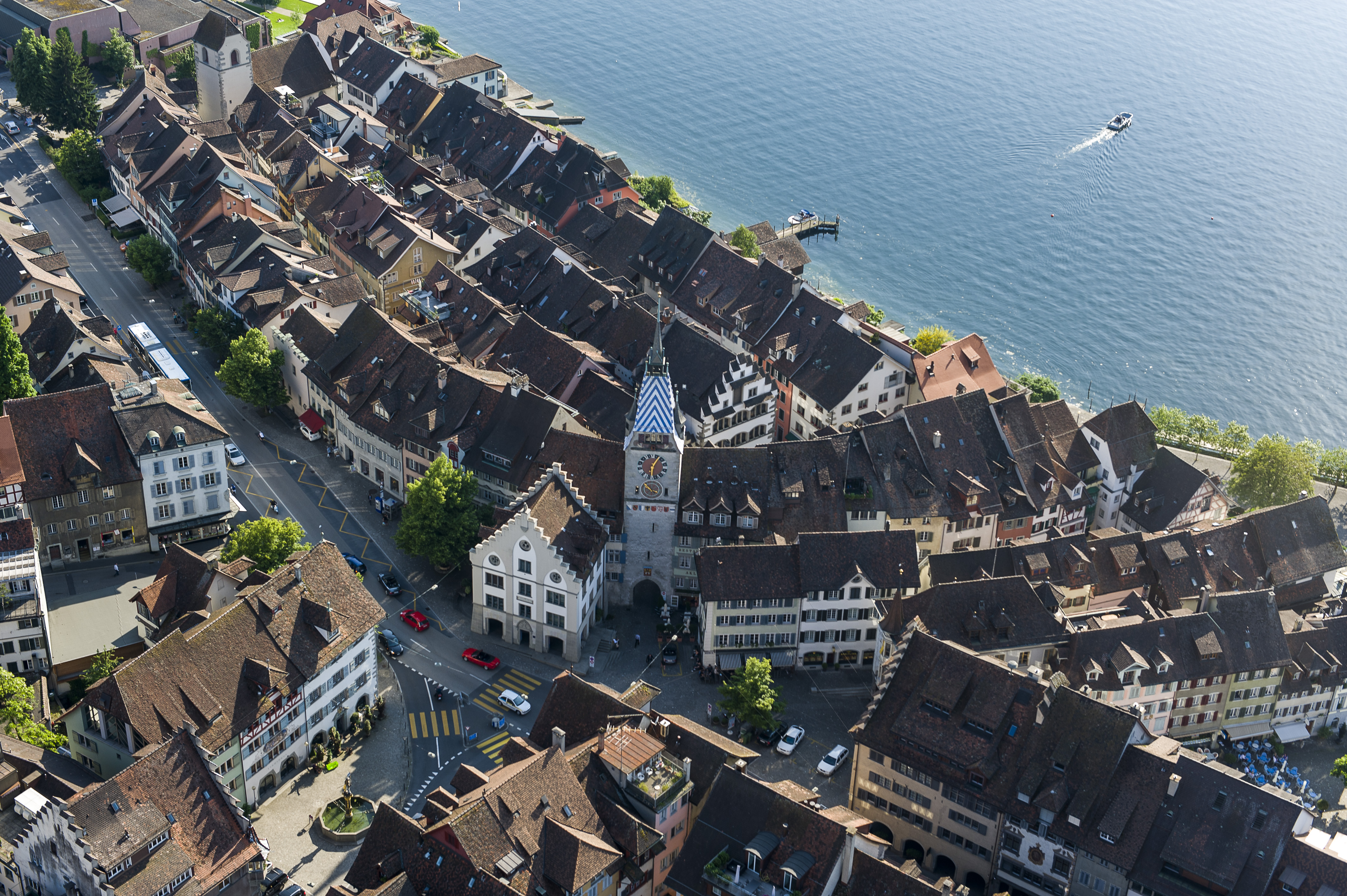
Aerial view of Zug

Aerial imagery of Zug.

Zug has an area (as of the 2004 survey) of 21.63 km^{2} (8.35 sq mi). Of this area, about 33.1% is used for agricultural purposes, while 37.9% is forested. Of the rest of the land, 26.6% is settled (buildings or roads) and 2.5% is unproductive land. In the 2004 survey a total of 353 ha (870 acres) or about 16.3% of the total area was covered with buildings, an increase of 60 ha (150 acres) over the 1982 amount. Over the same time period, the amount of recreational space in the municipality increased by 8 ha (20 acres) and is now about 2.53% of the total area. Of the agricultural land, 54 ha (130 acres) is used for orchards and vineyards, 651 ha (1,610 acres) is fields and grasslands and 39 ha (96 acres) consists of alpine grazing areas. Since 1982 the amount of agricultural land has decreased by 74 ha (180 acres). Over the same time period the amount of forested land has increased by 2 ha (4.9 acres). Rivers and lakes cover 20 ha (49 acres) in the municipality.

=== Climate ===
Climate data for Zug
Month	Jan	Feb	Mar	Apr	May	Jun	Jul	Aug	Sep	Oct	Nov	Dec	Year
Mean daily maximum °C (°F)	5 (41)	5 (41)	10 (50)	14 (57)	17 (63)	20 (68)	23 (73)	23 (73)	19 (66)	16 (61)	10 (50)	5 (41)	14 (57)
Mean daily minimum °C (°F)	−2 (28)	−2 (28)	0 (32)	3 (37)	6 (43)	9 (48)	12 (54)	12 (54)	9 (48)	6 (43)	2 (36)	−1 (30)	5 (40)
Average precipitation days (≥ 1.0 mm)	12.3	11.5	13	11.3	11.3	11.3	11.5	10.1	9.4	9.6	11.5	13.1	135.9
Average snowy days (≥ 1.0 cm)	4.1	4.2	1	0.7	0.1	0	0	0	0	0.1	1.7	3.9	15.8
Source: Meteoblue

See also climate of Lucerne and Zürich.

=== Weather ===
Zug has an average of 136.1 days of rain per year and on average receives 1,224 mm (48.2 in) of precipitation. It has an average of 5.5 days per year with visibility reduced to less than 1 km, the international definition of fog. The wettest month is August during which time Zug receives an average of 158 mm (6.2 in) of precipitation. During this month there is precipitation for an average of 12.7 days. The month with the most days of precipitation is June, with an average of 13.7, but with only 156 mm (6.1 in) of precipitation. The driest month of the year is January with an average of 67 mm (2.6 in) of precipitation over 12.7 days.

== Politics ==
=== Government ===
The City Council (Stadtrat) constitutes the executive government of the Town of Zug and operates as a collegiate authority. It is composed of five councillors (German: Stadtrat/-rätin), each presiding over a department (Departement) comprising several bureaus. The president of the executive department acts as mayor (Stadtpräsident). In the mandate period 2015–2018 (Legislatur) the City Council is presided by Stadtpräsident Karl Kobelt. Departmental tasks, coordination measures and implementation of laws decreed by the Grand Municipal Council are carried by the City Council. The regular election of the City Council by any inhabitant valid to vote is held every four years. The current mandate period (Legislatur) is from 2019 to 2022. Any resident of Zug allowed to vote can be elected as a member of the City Council. The delegates are selected by means of a system of Majorz (since 2014). The mayor is elected as such as well by public election while the heads of the other departments are assigned by the collegiate. The executive body holds its meetings in the Stadthaus (Town Hall) on Kolinplatz. As of October 2018, Zug's City Council is made up of two of FDP (FDP.The Liberals, of whom one is also the mayor), and one each of CVP (Christian Democratic Party), CSP (Christian Social Party), and SVP (Swiss People's Party). The last regular election was held on 7 October 2018.

The City Council (Stadtrat) of Zug
City Councilor (Stadtrat/-rätin)	Party	Head of Department (Vorsteher, since) of	elected since
Karl Kobelt (Note: Mayor (Stadtpräsident))	FDP	Mayor's Office (Präsidialdepartement, 2019)	2013
André Wicky	SVP	Finance (Finanzdepartement, 2019)	2013
Vroni Straub-Müller (Note: Vice-Mayor (Vizepräsidentin))	CSP	Education (Bildungsdepartement, 2011)	2010
Eliane Birchmeier	FDP	Engineering (Baudepertement, 2019)	2018
Urs Raschle	CVP	Social Welfare, Environment, and Security (Departement Soziales, Umwelt und Sicherheit (SUS), 2015)	2014

Martin Würmli is Town Chronicler (Stadtschreiber) since 2014 and presides the Town Office (Stadtkanzlei). He has been elected by the collegiate.

=== Federal elections ===
==== National Council ====
In the 2015 federal election the most popular party was the SVP with 25.4% of the vote. The next three most popular parties were the CVP (22.5%), the FDP (19.5%) and the SP (17.2%). In the federal election, a total of 9,438 votes were cast, and the voter turnout was 55.4%. The 2015 election saw a large change in the voting when compared to 2011. The percentage of the vote received by the SP increased sharply from 6.4% in 2011 to 17.2% in 2015, while the percentage that the GPS received dropped from 21.3% to 9.5%.

=== International relations ===
==== Twin towns – Sister cities ====
After World War II, Zug helped the town of Fürstenfeld, Styria in Austria. In 1986 they decided to become sister cities.

- Fürstenfeld, Styria in Austria, 1986
- (Bosnia and Herzegovina) Kalesija, Bosnia-Herzegowina, 2008

== Demographics ==
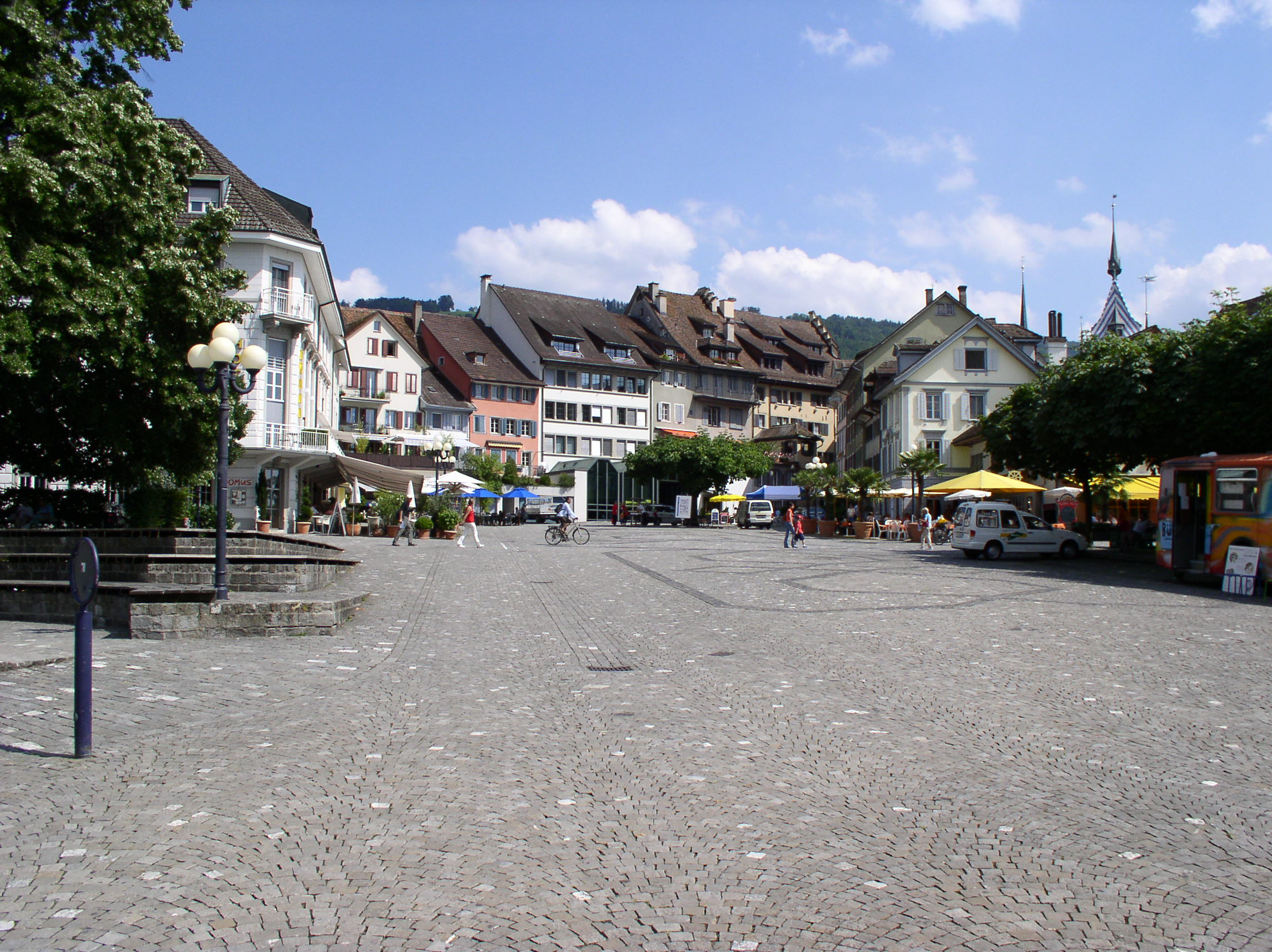
Landsgemeindeplatz

Zug has a population (as of 31 December 2020) of 30,934. As of 2014, 31.7% of which are foreign nationals. Over the last 10 years [when?] the population has grown at a rate of 11.4%. Most of the population (as of 2000) speaks German (81.8%), with Italian being second most common (3.8%) and Serbo-Croatian being third (3.2%).

In Zug about 76% of the population (between the ages 25 and 64) have completed either non-mandatory upper secondary education or additional higher education (either university or a Fachhochschule).

Zug has an unemployment rate of 2.28%. As of 2005, there were 172 people employed in the primary economic sector and about 51 businesses involved in this sector. 5,821 people are employed in the secondary sector and there are 269 businesses in this sector. 21,445 people are employed in the tertiary sector, with 3,205 businesses in this sector.

== Sport ==
Zug is known as a hockey town in Switzerland. The town's main team is EV Zug, which plays in the National League (NL). They play their home games in the 7,800-seat OYM Hall. The team has recently won two NL titles in 2021 and 2022. EV Zug II plays in the Second Regio League, the fifth highest league in Switzerland. HC Zugerland plays in the Third Regio League, the sixth highest league in Switzerland. Zug also has numerous junior teams that compete in the different junior leagues of Switzerland.

There are also an amateur association football team, Zug 94, which was formed in 1994 and one amateur Rugby Team, Zug Rugby Club, in the national 3rd Division. They also have the largest junior (minis) club in Switzerland. They have had many junior players representing Switzerland at U18 & U19 Internationally. Additionally, there is an amateur floorball team, Zug United. Zug has a rowing club See-Club Zug, which is repeatedly the highest ranked rowing club in Switzerland.

The Motorsports team and Global Championship League team and Global Champions Tour team Iron Dames is based out of Zug.

== Economy ==
As of 2012, there were a total of 40,166 people employed in the municipality. Of these, a total of 142 people worked in 42 businesses in the primary economic sector. The secondary sector employed 5,939 workers in 351 separate businesses. Finally, the tertiary sector provided 34,085 jobs in 6,592 businesses. In 2013 a total of 15.3% of the population received social assistance.

Since 2016, Zug has accepted digital currency, first for small payments of municipal fees up to CH200. To reduce risk, Zug immediately converts any cryptocurrency received into Swiss francs. This is part of a strategy to associate Zug with new technologies. Zug is a popular location for incorporation of companies, such as Siemens Building Technologies, and Nord Stream AG. Zug has also been referred to as Crypto Valley because of the large number of companies engaged in cryptocurrency in the city. These include Ethereum, Cardano, Polkadot and Bitcoin Suisse. By 2018, a Crypto Valley Association had been formed, with Oliver Bussmann as its president.

== Culture ==
=== Situation ===
The lake shore has been embanked and forms a promenade, from which views of the Rigi and Pilatus, as well as of the snowy peaks of the Bernese Oberland, are gained. Towards its northerly end, a monument marks the spot where a part of the shore slipped into the lake in 1887.

The older part of the town is rather crowded together, though only four of the wall towers and a small part of the town walls still survive.

The most striking old building in the town is the parish church of St Oswald (late 15th century), dedicated to St Oswald, king of Northumbria (d. 642), one of whose arms was brought to Zug in 1485. The town hall, also a 15th-century building, now houses the Historical and Antiquarian Museum. There are some quaint old painted houses close by. A little way higher up the hillside is a Capuchin convent in a striking position, close to the town wall and leaning against it. Still higher, and outside the old town, is the fine new parish church of St Michael, consecrated in 1902.

The business quarter is on the rising ground north of the old town, near the railway station. Several fine modern buildings rise on or close to the shore in the town and to its south, whilst to the southwest is a convent of Capuchin nuns, who manage a large girls' school and several other educational establishments.

The Museum of Prehistory Zug houses an important collection of archaeological remains, especially from the late Bronze Age (urnfield culture) settlement of Zug-Sumpf. Many of Catharine II of Russia's relatives descended from Zug and became known as the Volga Germans.

=== Museums ===
There are three museums in the town: the Museum of Prehistory, which displays archaeological finds from Canton Zug; the castle houses the Museum of Cultural History of the town and Canton Zug, and the Zug Art Gallery attracts visitors with its exhibitions. Several municipalities also have their own local museum. The Casino Theatre in Zug and the Zug Burgbachkeller, along with the Chollerhalle cultural center, are the most famous establishments. The event centers in Baar, Cham and Rotkreuz and the Zug youth scene (Galvanik, Podium Industrie 45) enrich the range of cultural events.

Zug is surrounded with mountains, rivers and lakes including the mountains Zugerberg and the Walchwilerberg Oberallmig, the Höhronen and the river Sihl. The Choller nature reserve is also near Lake Zug.

Sights within the town include the late Gothic church of St. Wolfgang, near Hünenberg, or St. Oswald in Zug, the old town of Zug with the Town Hall and the Zytturm (clock tower), the Huwiler Tower, the Zurlaubenhof, feudal estate of the family Zurlauben, on the outskirts of the town.

Zug's culture also includes the famous Zuger cherry liqueur cake. Local specialties, in addition to the cherry and the cherry liqueur cake, include the Zug 'Rötel', a fine lake charfish, found on many menus.

The IG Culture Zug society, an umbrella organization of museums, theaters, orchestras and other cultural organizations, was founded in Zug in 1995. The society publishes calendars and a magazine of cultural events in the canton. In 2019 it had 167 members.

=== Heritage sites ===
There are a number of Swiss heritage sites of national significance in Zug. These include two libraries, the Library of the former Capuchin monastery and the library of the parish church of St. Michael. One archaeological site, the Sumpf a late Bronze Age lake shore settlement, is included, as are three museums; the Burg (Castle museum), Kunsthaus (Art museum) and Museum für Urgeschichte (Museum for ancient history). There are three archives that are included in the list; Bürgerarchiv Zug (Citizen's archive of Zug), Staatsarchiv Zug (State/Canton of Zug archive) and the Unternehmensarchiv der Landis & Gyr AG (Landis & Gyr AG company archives). The rest of the sites are the Catholic Church of St. Oswald with Charnel house, the Seminary of St. Michael, the town walls and several buildings in the old town of Zug.

The prehistoric settlements at Oterswil/Insel Eielen, Riedmatt and Sumpf are part of the Prehistoric Pile dwellings around the Alps a UNESCO World Heritage Site.

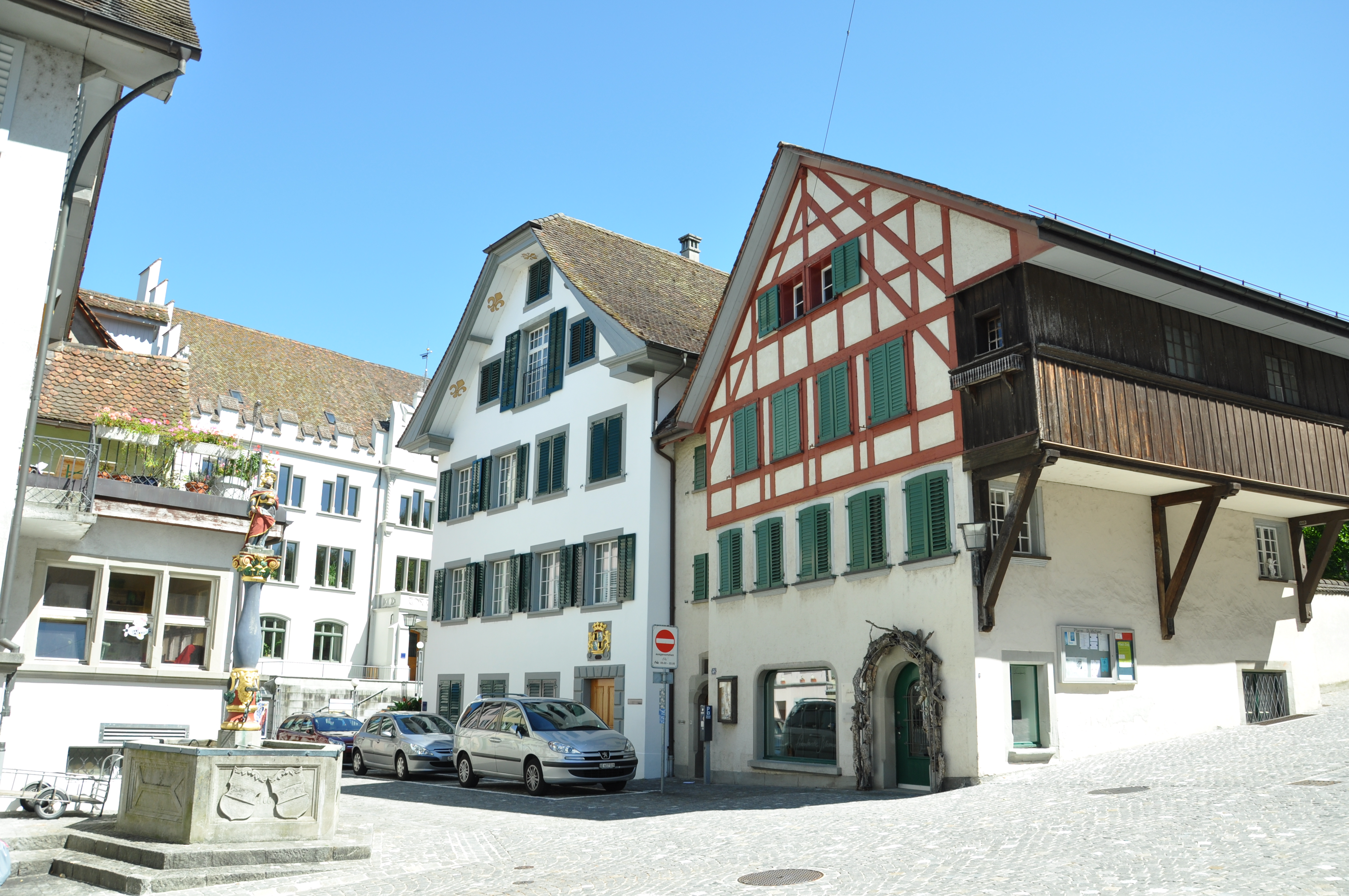
Library of the Zug Parish Church

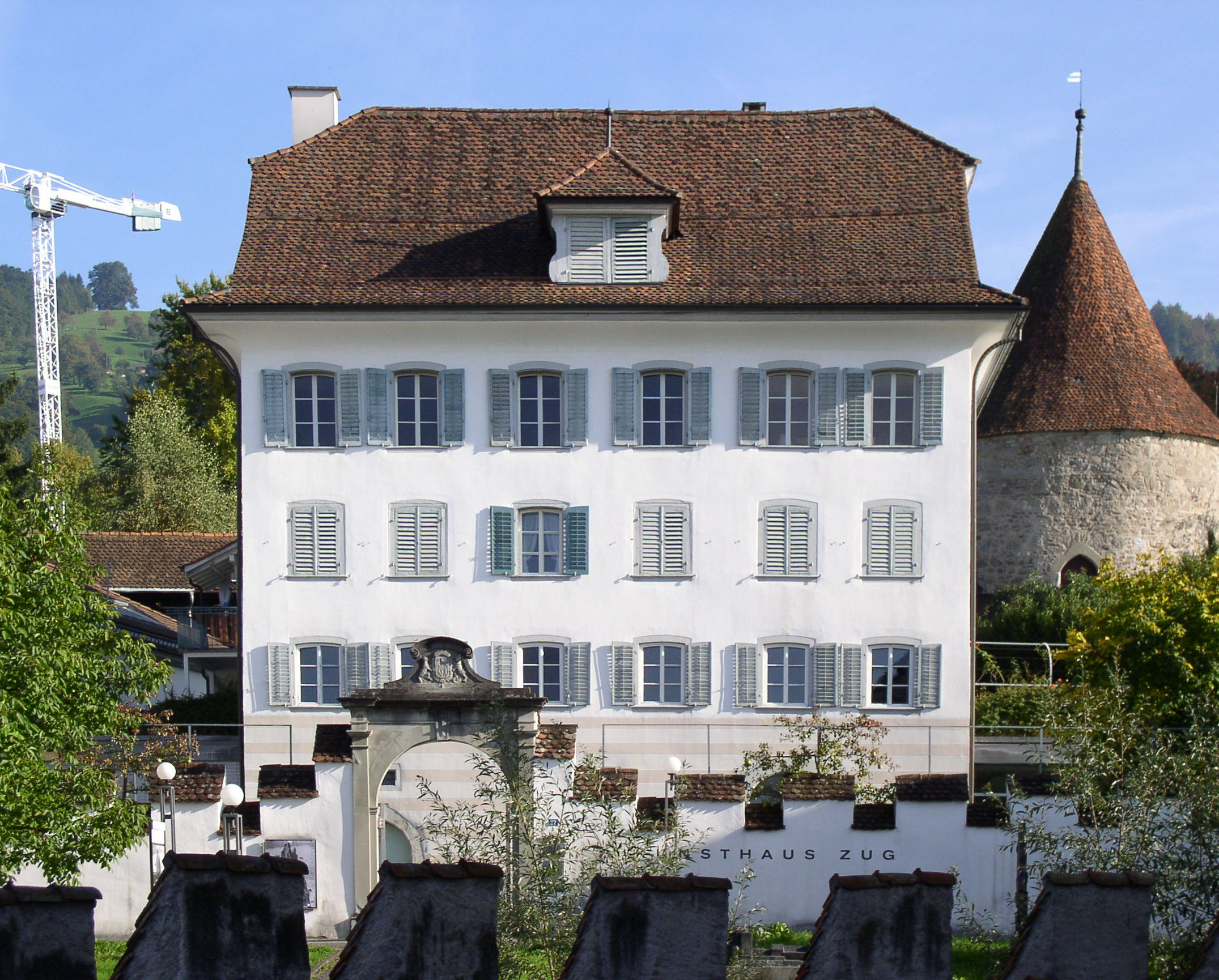
Kunsthaus or Art Museum

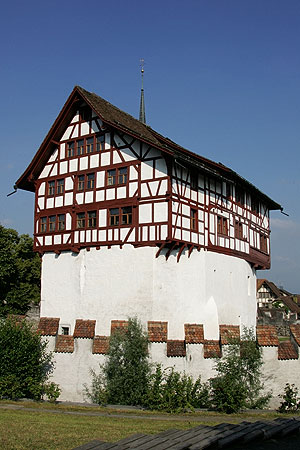
Zug Castle, now a museum

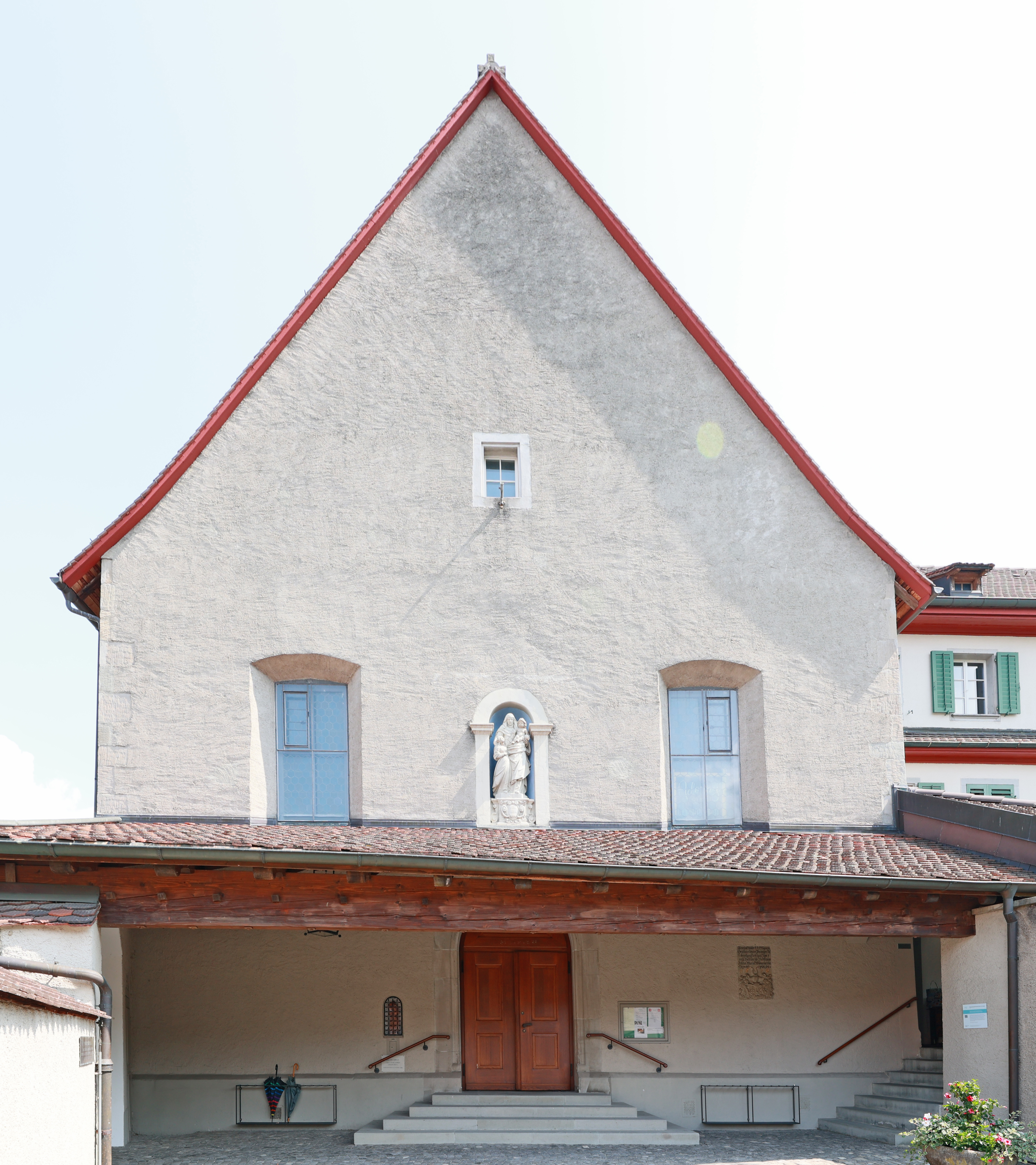
Capuchin Cloister, Church of St. Anne, Zug (2023) by Elena Ternovaja

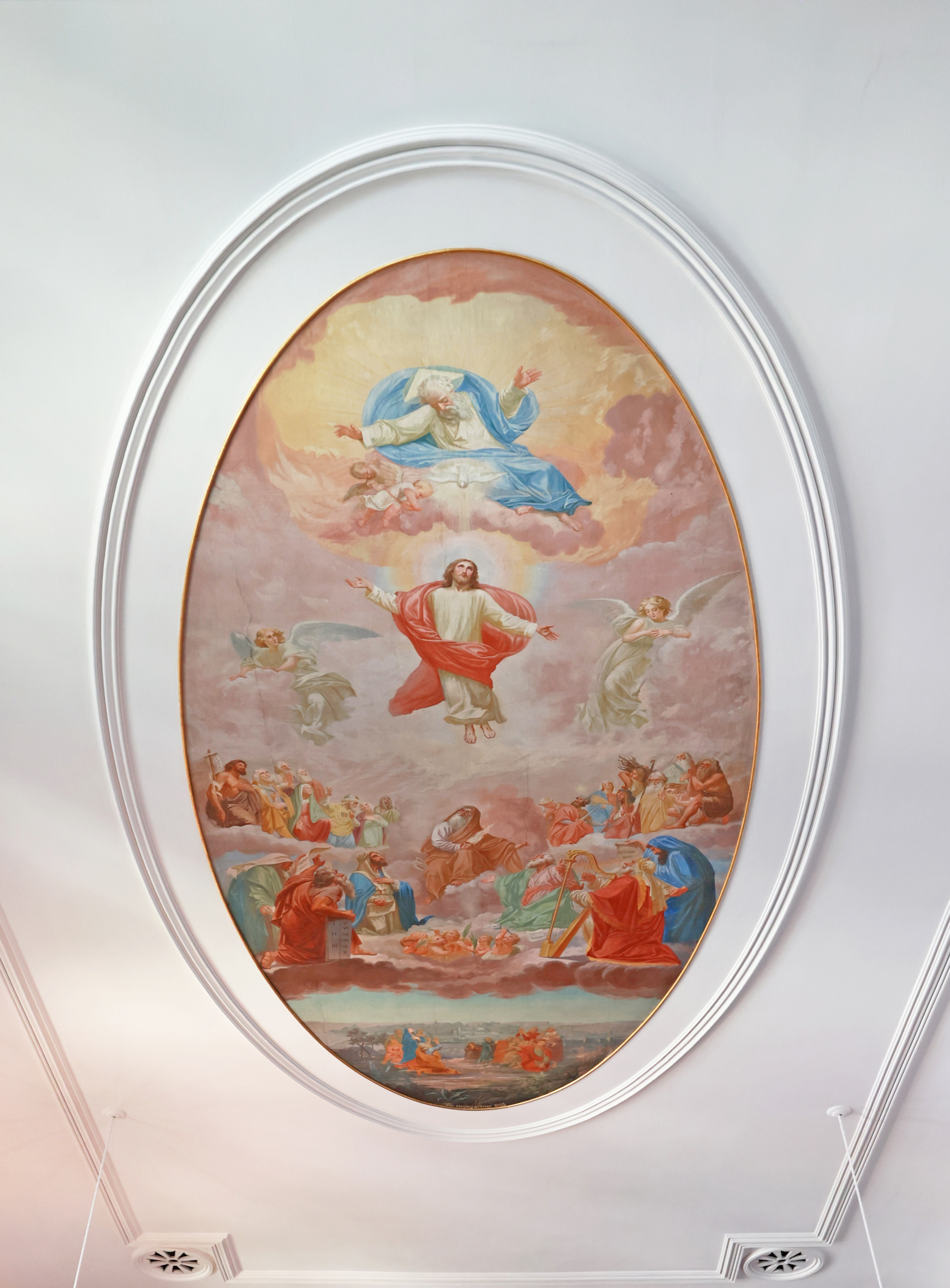
Ceiling of the Capuchin cloister, Church of St Anne, Zug (2023) by Elena Ternovaja

== Education ==
The Zug education system is based on equal abilities and includes compulsory primary and secondary school, with optional secondary education and vocational training. Two thirds of young people go into vocational education, connected to an apprenticeship, joining the professional world after the 9th grade of secondary school. The international business community of Zug offers many and varied apprenticeships along with the Zug technical and industrial college, GIBZ, and the business college, KBZ, provide the academic knowledge and skills.

Zug has a long tradition of education. Private schools, like the Montana Institute Zug, on Zugerberg, International School of Zug or Lucerne (ISZL), or the Dr. Pfister Institute AG, Oberägeri supplement the range available. In addition, there are the three former non-state teacher training colleges in Menzingen, Holy Cross in Cham and St. Michael in Zug.

=== Tertiary education ===
Canton Zug has two high schools: the Canton High School in the town of Zug, and the Cantonal School in Menzingen. Also at higher secondary level, is the Vocational School Zug and the Business Studies School, incorporated within the Canton School. Zug is one of the university cantons, with, on the one hand, the University of Teacher Training, PHZ Zug, on the other, a polytechnic for financial services.

There are also six technical colleges (for business, computer science, engineering design, naturopathy and homeopathy, child education, and rescue services).

In 2022 the European Institute of Management and Technology (EIMT) has been duly established in the Canton of Zug, Switzerland as a Business, Management and Technology Tertiary education school offering bachelor's, master's and doctorate degrees, through online, onsite or hybrid mediums and through other schools worldwide under the aegis of the laws, regulations and authorities of Switzerland. The European Institute of Management and Technology has been granted Accreditation for two years by the Diplomatic Research and Policy Foundation (DRPF). Diplomatic Research and Policy Foundation is a prestigious Intergovernmental Organization a Government recognized Accreditation Agency founded by Ministry of Education and Science, Republic of Macedonia and Ministry of Diaspora, Republic of Albania. The same is now graced by the presence of Ministry of Labour and Social Service, Government of Kosovo.

=== International Schools ===
The range of educational institutions is a key factor for location in the globalized world of competition, especially for foreign employees, the so-called 'Expats'. The four international schools have been developed accordingly, and report a high student intake.

== Transportation ==
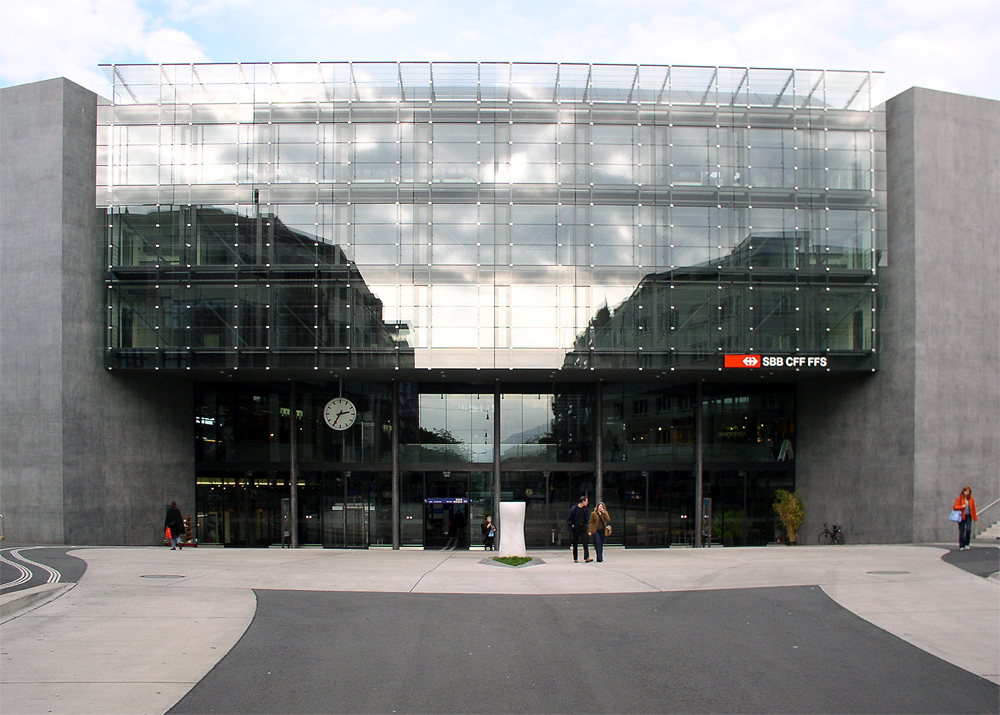
The railway station

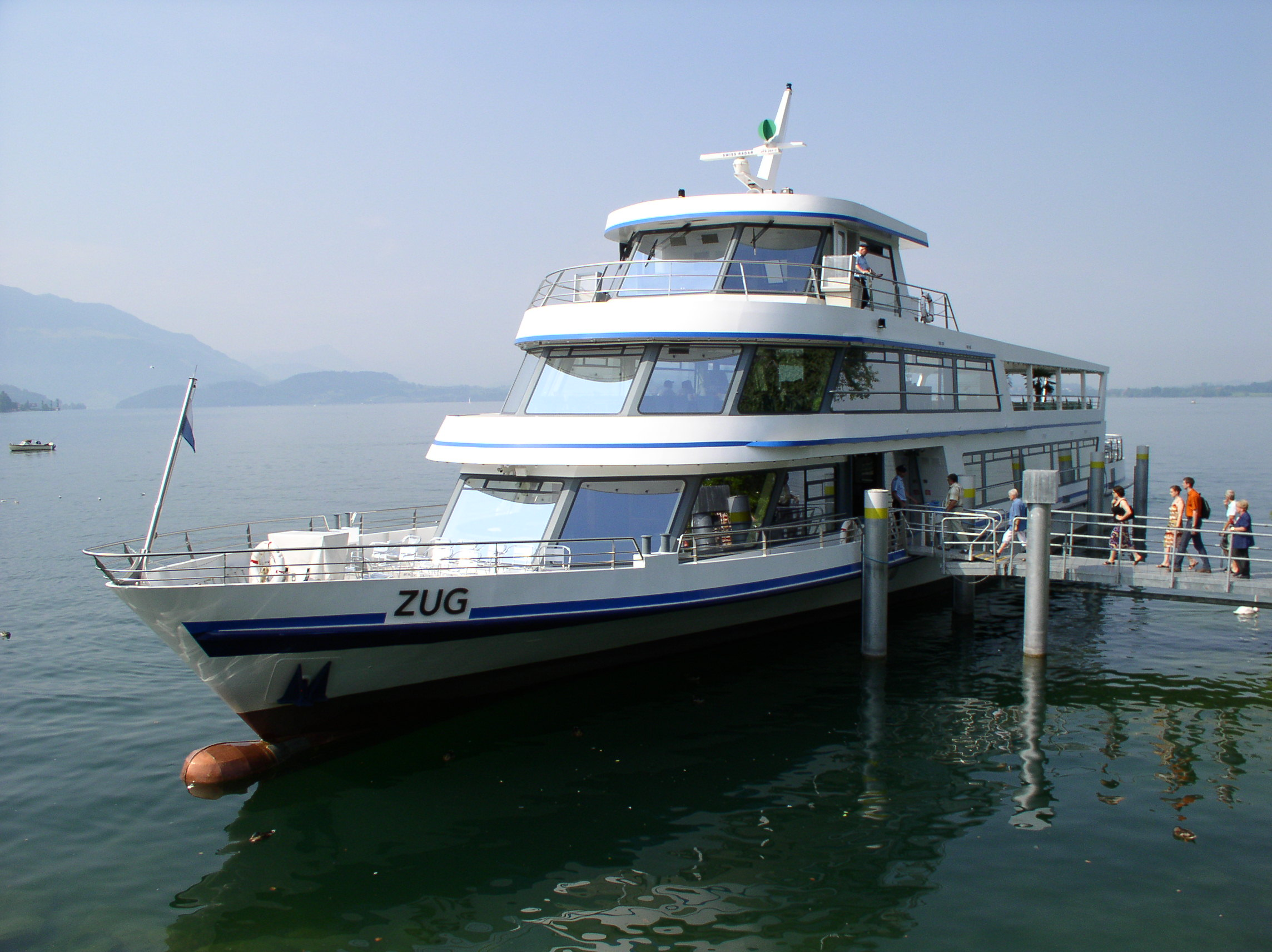
MS Zug

Zug acts as an important transportation node.

An extensive bus network within the town and canton is provided by ZVB Zugerland Verkehrsbetriebe.

The Swiss Federal Railways link at Zug railway station for Cham – Horgen – Zürich, Steinhausen – Affoltern am Albis, Arth-Goldau – St. Gotthard – Ticino and Italy, and Rotkreuz – Luzern. Zug is the hub of the Zug Stadtbahn (an S-Bahn-style commuter rail network). The network consisted of the following lines:

- S1: Baar–Zug–Cham–Rotkreuz–(Luzern) (also S1 of the Lucerne S-Bahn)
- S2: Baar Lindenpark–Zug–Walchwil–Arth-Goldau–(Erstfeld)

Zug is also at the end of Zürich S-Bahn suburban railway network, on lines S5 and S24.

The Zugerbergbahn is a funicular linking the Zug suburb of Schönegg (558 m) with the Vordergeissboden (literally: anterior goat terrain, 925 m), the plateau of the Zugerberg overlooking the town and Lake Zug.

The A4 motorway and other main roads connect Zug with the rest of the nation.

Water transportation on Lake Zug is centred on the town, with public transport on the lake provided by (Motor Ship) MS Zug, MS Schwyz, MS Rigi and MS Schwan. These vessels belong to the Zugersee Schifffahrt, a partner of the local public transport executive, ZVB Zugerland Verkehrsbetriebe.

The nearest airport is Zurich Airport, located 49 km (30 mi) north east of Zug.

== Notable people ==
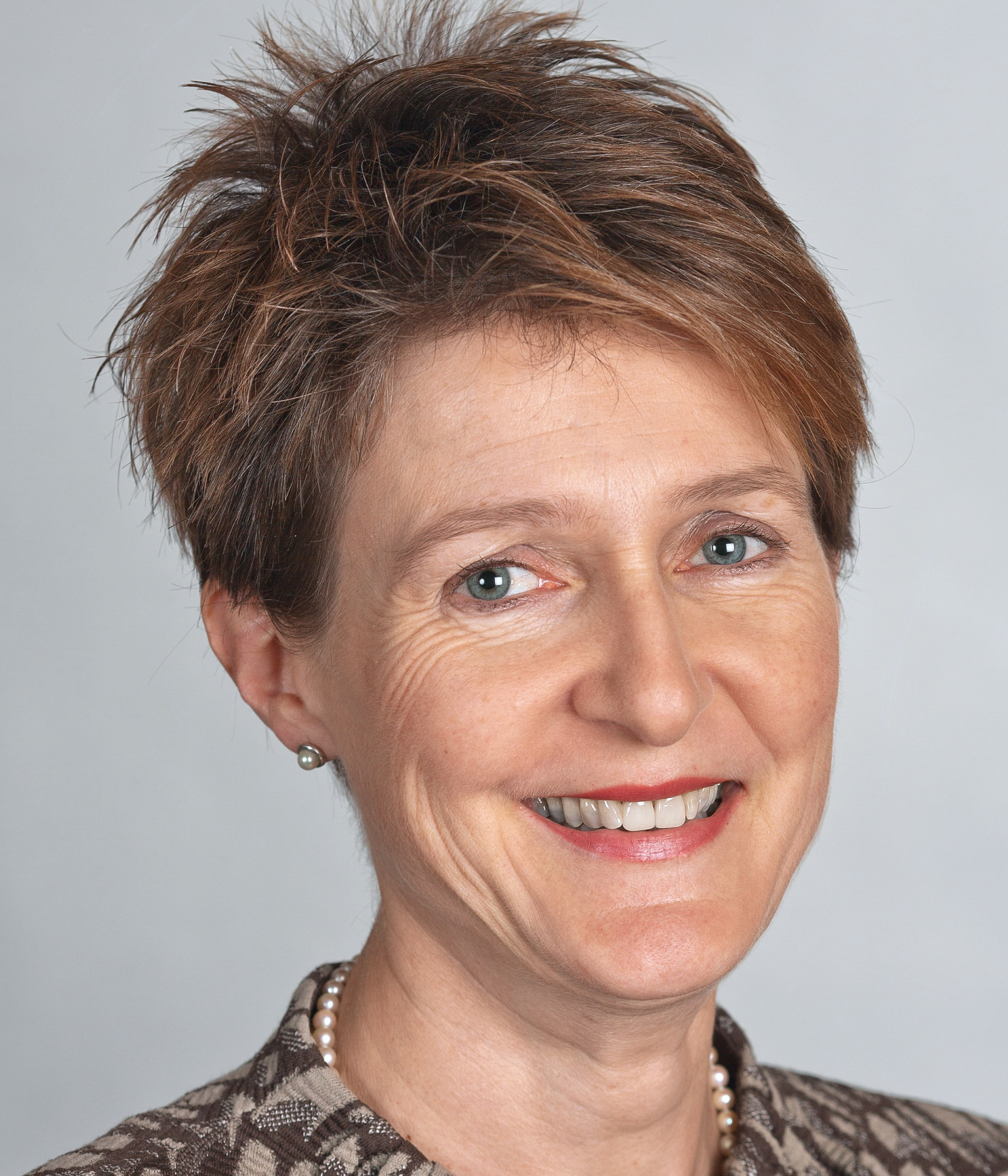
Simonetta Sommaruga, 2011

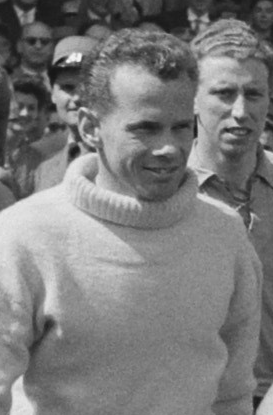
Georges Stuber, 1954

- Johannes Brandenberg (1660–1729), a painter of pastoral subjects, historical pictures and battle-pieces
- Béat Fidèle Antoine Jean Dominique de La Tour-Châtillon de Zurlauben (1720–1799), soldier in the French army and Swiss historian
- Henric Trenk (1818–1892), a Romanian painter and graphic artist of Romantic landscapes
- Franz Vital Lusser (1849–1927), Swiss civil engineer
- Max Husmann (1888–1965), Swiss peacemaker (Operation Sunrise), educator and founder of Institut Montana Zugerberg
- Helen Keiser (1926-2013), a writer, painter and photographer
- Walo Lüönd (1927–2012), a movie actor
- Marc Rich (1934–2013), controversial businessman, founded Glencore (the largest company in Switzerland) and funded the early-growth of Kanton Zug
- Andreas Blum (1938–2024), actor and radio journalist
- Carl Rütti (born 1949), a notable composer who writes choral music
- Simonetta Sommaruga (born 1960), a politician, current member of the Swiss Federal Council, became President of the Swiss Confederation in 2015
- Roland Dahinden (born 1962), a trombonist and composer
- Severin Hacker (born 1984), a computer scientist, co-founded Duolingo
- Mirjam Indermaur (born 1967), Swiss businesswoman and writer

Sport

- Georges Stuber (1925–2006), a football goalkeeper who played 14 times for Switzerland
- Karl Fridlin (born 1935), a former swimmer, competed at the 1960 Summer Olympics
- Fritz Schmid (born 1959), a football coach, currently the manager of the New Zealand men's national football team
- Lionel Donato (born 1964), Swiss former professional footballer
- Patrick Fischer (born 1975), head coach of the Swiss national ice hockey team
- Nadia Styger (born 1978), a former World Cup alpine ski racer.
- Christoph Schmid (born 1982), a sport shooter, competed in the 2008 Summer Olympics
- Sibylle Scherer (born 1992), a handballer who plays for LK Zug and the Switzerland national team
- Felix Hirsiger (born 1998), Swiss-British racing driver
- Jad Smaira (born 2003), Lebanese footballer

== Bibliography ==
- Coolidge, William Augustus Brevoort (1911). "Zug". In Chisholm, Hugh (ed.). Encyclopædia Britannica (11th ed.). Cambridge University Press – via Internet Archive.
