= Schweizer Verlagshaus =

Former Swiss publishing house

- Formerly: Schweizer Druck- und Verlagshaus (until 1964)
- Industry: Publishing
- Founded: 1907
- Founder: Hugo Richter
- Headquarters: Zurich, Switzerland
- Owner: Meyer family (from 1930)
- Number of employees: 65 (1957)

The Schweizer Verlagshaus ("Swiss publishing house"), until 1964 the Schweizer Druck- und Verlagshaus ("Swiss printing and publishing house"), was a publishing house in Zurich, founded in 1907 as a cooperative. It became known throughout Switzerland through the Neue Schweizer Bibliothek (NSB), a book series for Swiss authors that was turned into a book club in 1950. The company ceased publishing in 1993 and sold the NSB to Bertelsmann in 1997.

== History ==
The Schweizer Druck- und Verlagshaus was founded in Zurich in 1907 as a cooperative publishing house by the publisher Hugo Richter, who took over the bankrupt estate of the Zurich publisher Caesar Schmidt. The printing-works owner Gottlieb Meyer, who from 1924 published Meyers Schweizer Frauen- und Modeblatt, joined the cooperative in 1909, became its president in 1921 and by 1930 had bought up most of its shares. From then on the company, called Schweizer Verlagshaus AG from 1964, was owned by the Meyer family. Besides novels, books for young people and non-fiction, from 1941 it also published the agricultural magazine Die Grüne. After difficult early years, it became successful in the 1930s. In 1957 it published 19 new titles and employed 65 people.

The publisher became known throughout Switzerland through the Neue Schweizer Bibliothek (NSB, "New Swiss Library"). Introduced in 1934, the book series gave Swiss authors a platform, among them Francesco Chiesa, Meinrad Inglin, Mary Lavater-Sloman and Hugo Marti; 96 volumes had appeared by 1950. In 1950, because of a lack of subscribers, it was converted into a book club of the same name, which brought new momentum, and from 1954 the NSB was the publisher's most important product. NSB book studios opened in Zurich, Bern and Basel in 1956–1957, and later also in St. Gallen and Rapperswil. In 1993 the Schweizer Verlagshaus ceased its publishing activities. In 1997 it sold the NSB, which had 150,000 subscribers, to the German media group Bertelsmann, which ran the book club from then on. In 2008 the Schweizer Verlagshaus only managed real estate.

== Bibliography ==
- 50 Jahre Schweizer Druck- und Verlagshaus AG Zürich, 1957
- 50 Jahre NSB 1934–1984, [1984]
