= Ethnographic Museum of the University of Zurich =

Coordinates: 47.3709°N 8.5346°E

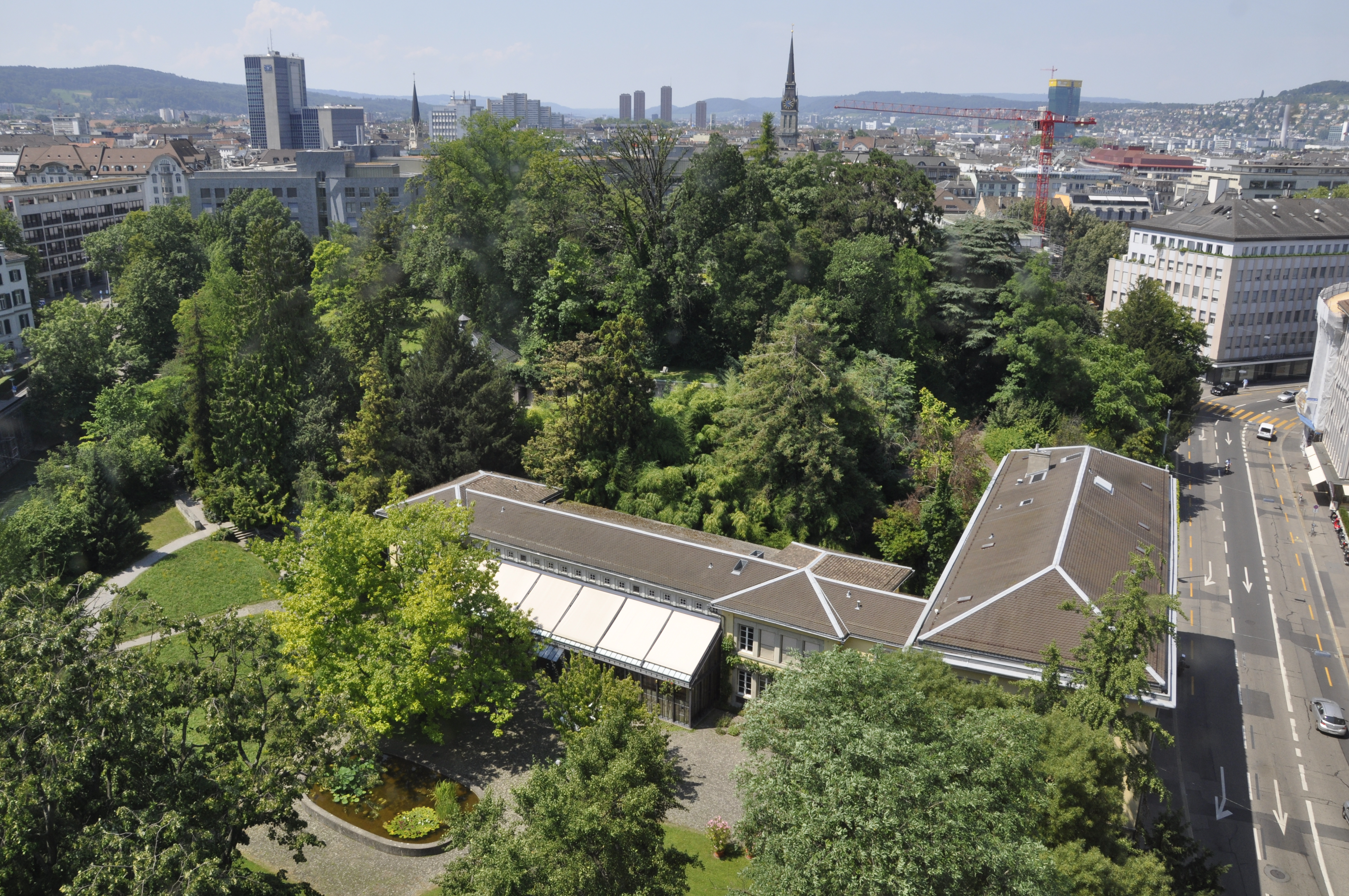
Viewed from above

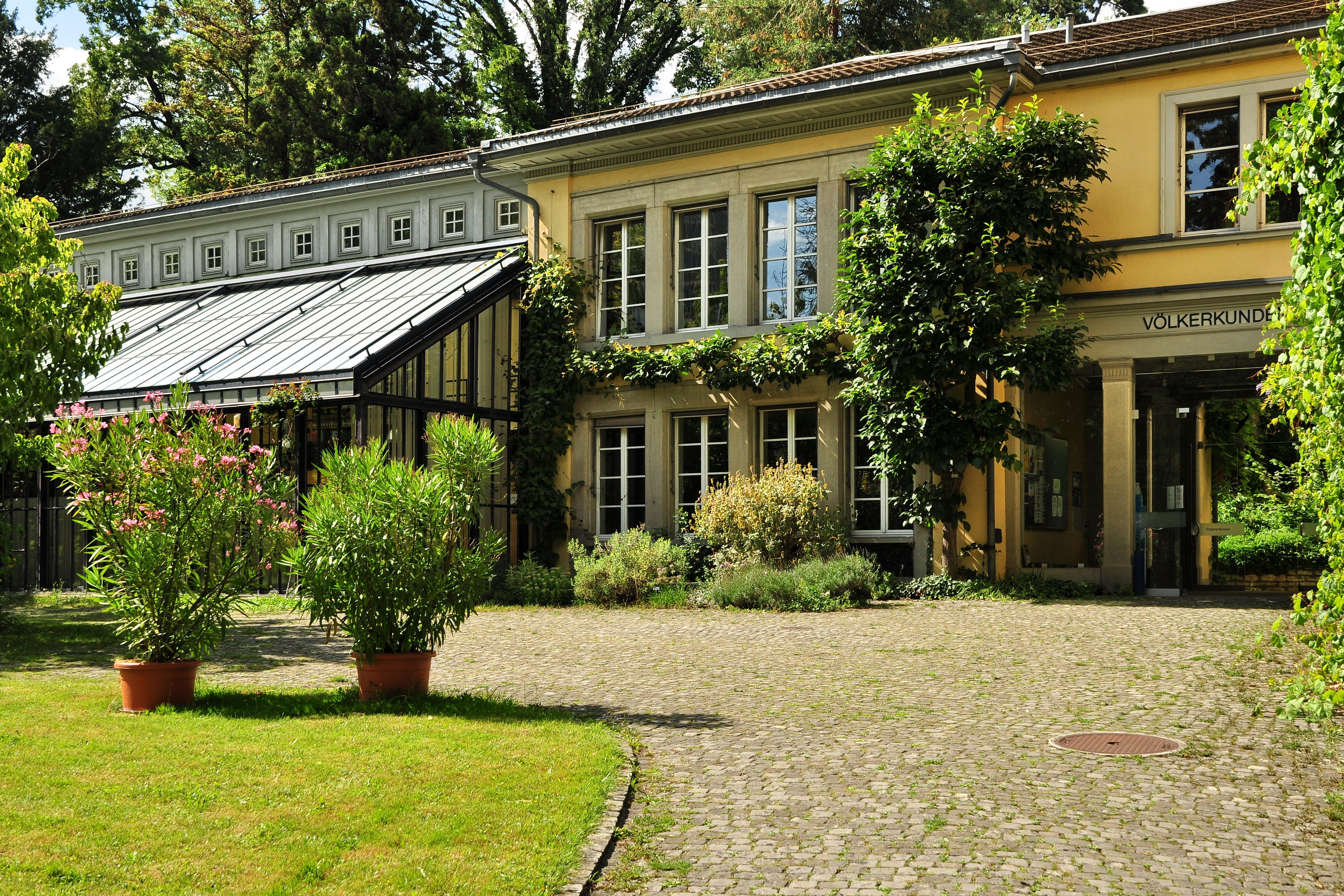
Museum building in the Old Botanical Garden

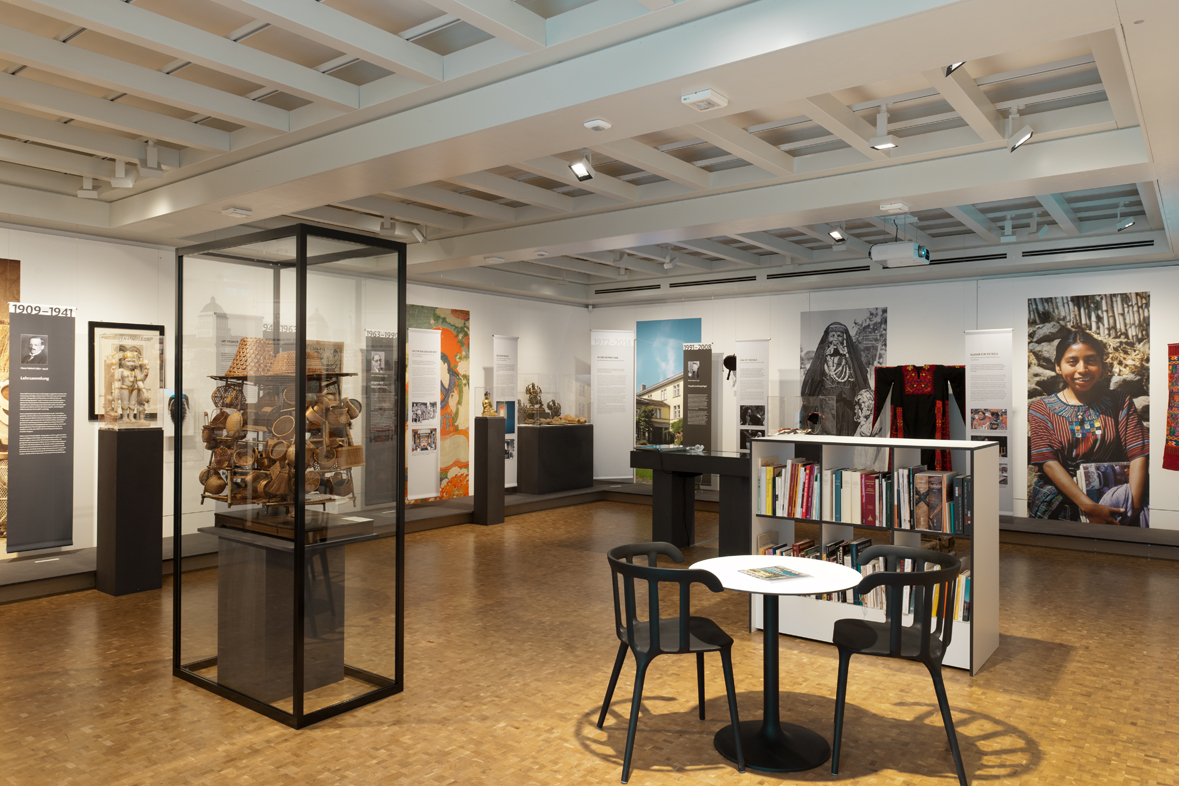
Interior of the exhibition hall on the ground floor

The Ethnographic Museum of the University of Zurich is the third oldest ethnological museum of Switzerland. Owner of its collections since 1914 is the University of Zurich. The main fields of the museum's activities are the maintenance of the collections, research, teaching and public relations (realization of exhibitions, publications and public events).

== Location and building ==
The ethnographic museum is located in downtown Zurich within the premises of the Old Botanical Garden “zur Katz”. The building was first constructed in 1864 and underwent various changes over time. Until 1977 it served as a depot, office building and green house of the Botanical Institute of the University of Zurich, the latter still recognizable in the library tract's architecture.

The buildings conversion into a museum was undertaken by the architects Hubacher, Issler and Partners, Zurich; another major renovation was carried out by the architects P. + J. Diethelm, St. Gall, in 2014. The complex of buildings now comprises depots, studios of photography, graphic art and conservation, archives, library, office tract, lecture hall and auditorium (which also serves as venue of public events), reception and three exhibition halls (total display space 700m^{2}).

== History ==
In 1889 the Ethnographic Collection of Zurich was presented to the public for the very first time. Initially the collection was property of the Ethnographische Gesellschaft Zürich [Ethnographic Society of Zurich] (since 1899: Geographisch-Ethnographische Gesellschaft Zürich, GEGZ [Geographic-Ethnographic Society of Zurich]); in 1914 the collection was handed over to the University of Zurich where it was open to the public in the university's main building until 1979. In 1972, with the introduction of ethnology as a new subject of study at the University of Zurich, the former “Ethnological Collection” was shifted from the Faculty of Natural Sciences to the Faculty of Arts and renamed as “Ethnographic Museum of the University of Zurich”. In 1980 the collection was moved to its present location.

Museum Directors

- 1888−1899: Otto Stoll (1849−1922)
- 1899−1911: Rudolf Martin (1864−1925)
- 1911−1941: Hans J. Wehrli (1871−1945)
- 1941−1963: Alfred Steinmann (1892−1974)
- 1963−1990: Karl H. Henking (1923−2005)
- 1991−2008: Michael Oppitz (* 1942)
- 2008-2025: Mareile Flitsch (* 1960)
- Since 2025: Alice Hertzog (* 1988)

== Collection ==
The museum collection is presented to the public by means of temporary exhibitions. At present (2015) it comprises more than 40’000 artefacts. Thematic focus areas are material witnesses of religious context (ritual objects and iconography of Hinduism, Buddhism, Christianity and Islam as well as of local religions in Asia, Indonesia (asien?), Australia, Oceania, the Americas and Africa) as well as objects embodying specific knowledge and skills relating to production and utilization (textiles, wickerwork, pottery, carving, smithery).

Geographical focus areas represented in the museum's collection are

- Africa: West- and Central Africa, Ethiopia
- Asia: Himalayas, China (including Tibet), India (including Northeast India) and Southeast Asia (especially Indonesia)
- Oceania (especially Melanesiea)
- Australia
- South America: Amazonia, Andes and parts of Mesoamerica
- North America: Great Plains
- Polar region

The museum also hosts a collection of visual anthropology consisting of 40’000 historical photos, a movie archive of about 2’400 titles, a sound archive containing 6’500 LPs and CDs originally collected by the Musikethnologisches Archiv der Universität Zürich [Music-Ethnological Archive of the University of Zurich], and an archive of documents related to the collections and the museum's history.

== Library ==
The museum library comprises some 35‘000 books and several dozen specialist periodicals and works of reference. The titles can be searched online, and most of the books are borrowable. There is a reading room with 20 workstations. Rare books and non-circulation videos can be viewed here as well.

== Literature ==
- Peter Gerber u. Katharina Haslwanter u. Andreas Isler: Gesichter eines Museums. 125 Jahre Ethnographische Sammlung Zürich. Völkerkundemuseum der Universität Zürich 2014.
- Karl Henking: Das Völkerkundemuseum der Universität Zürich: Geschichte und Ausblick. Zürich 1980.
- Verena Münzer und Peter R. Gerber: 100 Jahre Völkerkundemuseum: 1889–1989. Zürich 1989.
- Verena Münzer: Das Völkerkundemuseum der Universität Zürich 1889–1989. In: Geographica Helvetica Jg. 44, Nr. 3 1989.
- Miklós Szalay, u.a.: Das Völkerkundemuseum der Universität Zürich: Eine Uebersicht. Völkerkundemuseum der Universität Zürich 1972.

== See also ==
- List of ethnographic museums
- List of museums in Switzerland
