= Prisons in Switzerland =

Prisons in Switzerland are operated by the Swiss cantons, which are responsible for law enforcement in Switzerland. As of 2008, Switzerland has 124 prisons according to the Catalogue of Correctional Institutions (Katalog der Einrichtungen des Freiheitsentzuges) compiled by the Federal Statistical Office; other statistics, which account for various institutions being administratively associated with each other, report 117 prisons. Swiss prisons have a capacity of up to 6,736 detainees total (amounting to 89 detention places per 100,000 inhabitants), including up to 477 women and 105 minors. The detainees are housed in 4,531 single cells, 1,044 cells for multiple persons, 172 security cells, 200 disciplinary cells and 50 infirmary cells.

== Statistics ==
In 2008, Swiss prisons housed 5,780 detainees (77 detainees per 100,000 inhabitants), of which 5.8% were female, 1.2% minors and 69.7% non-Swiss nationals. Half of all detainees were serving prison sentences, a quarter were in pre-trial detention, six percent were detained for expulsion and extradition and three percent were reported as being in "protective custody and custody for other reasons". Additionally, in 2006, 5,333 persons served a prison sentence in the form of community work orders, and 114 served their sentence in the form of electronic monitoring house arrest.

in 2017, Prisoners that were locked up added up to about 6,900, while its maximum capacity is at about 7,500. The prison rate for Switzerland as of 2017 is up to 81 per 100,000. These numbers seemed to have slightly increased since 2008.

According to a 2006 U.S. government report, Swiss prison conditions generally meet international standards, but prison overcrowding is a problem, particularly in the cantons of Geneva, Zürich and Bern. The report cites a 2005 Swiss government report stating that one-third of the country's detention centers were at or above their designated capacity, and nine were overcrowded by 20 percent or more. Overcrowding to 200% of capacity caused a mutiny at Geneva's Champ-Dollon prison in 2006.

== Coordination across cantons ==
Since the 1950s, correctional policy, prison construction, and operation is coordinated in organizations set up through regional agreements between several cantons (Strafvollzugskonkordate). As of 2009, these are:

- Northwest and Central Switzerland Sentence Execution Agreement (Strafvollzugskonkordat der Nordwest- und Innerschweiz) consisting of Uri, Schwyz, Obwalden, Nidwalden, Luzern, Zug, Bern, Solothurn, Basel-Stadt, Basel-Landschaft and Aargau
- Eastern Switzerland Sentence Execution Agreement (Strafvollzugskonkordat der Ostschweiz) consisting of Appenzell Innerrhoden, Appenzell Ausserrhoden, Glarus, Graubünden, Schaffhausen, St. Gallen, Thurgau and Zürich
- Latin Switzerland Sentence Execution Agreement (Strafvollzugskonkordat der lateinischen Schweiz) consisting of Fribourg, Geneva, Jura, Neuchâtel, Vaud, Valais and Ticino

Training of prison staff is the responsibility of the joint Swiss Prison Staff Training Centre (French: Centre suisse de formation pour le personnel pénitentiaire, German: Schweizerisches Ausbildungszentrum für das Strafvollzugspersonal, Italian: Centro svizzero di formazione per il personale dei penitenziari) in Fribourg.

== History ==
=== Medieval and early modern period ===
Prisons in antiquity were primitive detention facilities consisting of dungeons and oubliettes used to secure individuals during criminal proceedings or to compel debt payment. During the Middle Ages, prisons served similar functions, often detaining individuals who had failed to pay fines. These facilities were typically dungeons or oubliettes constructed in castle basements. Monasteries were sometimes equipped with in-pace cells for religious personnel subjected to disciplinary measures.

In the ninth century, the Carolingians established prisons for confining members of the upper class who had committed offenses. Italian statutes from the thirteenth century document the existence of prisons serving for criminal detention. According to the code of Lübeck (1240), imprisonment for a determined duration could constitute a sanction. The Constitutio Criminalis Carolina, introduced in 1532, which provided for limited-term incarcerations for certain offenses and life imprisonment for death sentences commuted by pardon, made prison a standard instrument of punishment execution. Most commonly, prisoners were confined in underground dungeons or fortified towers, where detainees, often chained and deprived of rights, languished under precarious and extremely unsanitary conditions.

In rural regions of the Confederation, there were no proper prisons until the eighteenth century, only simple facilities that occasionally served this purpose. Cities were better equipped with towers (the Prisons Tower in Bern from 1405), fortresses (Aarburg), and former convents. Imprisonment, applied primarily as retaliation or exceptional preventive measure, systematically presented characteristics of severe and prolonged corporal punishment. Its purpose was not to improve detainees but only to punish them by inflicting physical and psychological suffering. High-ranking prisoners sometimes benefited from improved detention conditions.

In England, the House of Correction of Bridewell was created in 1557 to combat begging and vagrancy. On the continent, the first reformatory for male delinquents and beggars opened in Amsterdam in 1595. In German-speaking countries, educational currents at work during the early absolutist period favored the use of imprisonment with pedagogical aims in the seventeenth century. Through hard labor and strict discipline, detainees were expected to repent while being useful to the community, leading to their improvement. Simultaneously, imprisonment aimed to deter potential criminals, especially beggars tempted by criminal behavior. Those condemned to forced labor, placed in disciplinary houses (Schellenwerk), had to perform public utility work all day (road maintenance, ditch restoration). They spent nights in cells. In the seventeenth century, several cantons established such houses: Bern in 1614/1615, Basel and Fribourg in 1617, Zurich in 1630 (in the former Oetenbach convent from 1637), Geneva in 1631, and St. Gallen in 1661.

=== Helvetic Republic and Restoration ===
The most severe punishment in the Helvetic Republic's 1799 Penal Code was irons with forced labor. The code also provided for detention without irons, either in solitary confinement or collective cells where detainees could choose their work. The Helvetic Republic operated central prisons in Basel, Zurich, Bern, Solothurn, Lucerne, Fribourg, and Baden. Additional facilities were needed as the Penal Code's implementation caused a massive increase in prisoner numbers. Several execution regulations were enacted in 1800. Under the Restoration, several cantons (Lucerne, Thurgau, Vaud, Solothurn, Bern) adopted these regulations with modifications, but collaboration between Swiss prisons disappeared.

Aargau, St. Gallen, Basel, Ticino, Schaffhausen, and Zurich in 1836 created their own penal codes, mostly inspired by Austrian and Bavarian models that considered imprisonment the principal sanction. In Central Switzerland cantons, which returned to Ancien Régime penal norms after the Helvetic period, imprisonment sentences maintained priority alongside corporal punishment and the pillory.

=== Modern penitentiary development ===
In Geneva, where courts had applied the French Penal Code since 1810 and regularly pronounced imprisonment sentences, a modern cantonal penitentiary emerged in 1825. Its principles (discipline, isolation, silence) resembled those of the New York Auburn prison. In 1826, Lausanne acquired a modern penitentiary where criminal sentences and correctional measures were executed according to the silent system. This system, which prohibited prisoner communication, was adopted in 1839 in modified form at the St. Jacques cantonal penitentiary in St. Gallen. The Lenzburg penitentiary in Aargau began operation in 1864, where sentences were served according to the progressive Irish system (gradual improvement of detention conditions) combined with agricultural work in open settings. These modern prisons accommodated different types of sentences and had separate divisions for women.

The Bernese institution that received its first detainees in 1834, Lucerne prison, and other Central Swiss establishments practiced communal detention in converted former public buildings, such as Uri's former leper colony, requiring numerous guards. In Zurich, the prison was housed in the former Dominican convent of Oetenbach (renovated in 1834). The sentence execution regime remained largely dependent on outdated forced labor traditions but was reformed under the influence of Conrad Melchior Hirzel, author of the essay "Über Zuchthäuser und ihre Verwandlung in Besserungshäuser" (1826). It was based on dominant Christian values of the time. Work was considered a means of disciplining detainees and leading them to live respectfully. They should not be humiliated but receive instruction and moral edification. The Regensdorf penitentiary received its first prisoners in 1901, where progressive methods aimed at reintegrating detainees of both sexes into society were introduced based on the 1903 sentence execution ordinance. Cantons intensified their collaboration from 1867, following the founding of the Swiss Society for Penitentiary Reform.

=== Twentieth century evolution ===
The evolution of the prison regime in the twentieth century was characterized by modulated sentence execution. Establishments were created for first-time offenders and others for repeat offenders, open, semi-open, or closed establishments, and facilities for executing measures. Hindelbank has housed Switzerland's only women-only penitentiary since 1896. Between 1984 and 1994, annual incarcerations in sentence and measure execution establishments numbered approximately 10,700. After a temporary decline (approximately 5,400 in 2001), numbers increased again (approximately 7,800 in 2007). Traditional incarceration was increasingly replaced by new forms of sentence execution: semi-detention, community service, and electronically supervised sentence execution. The proportion of these new execution forms increased from 30% in 1984 to 49% in 2007. Since the revised Penal Code's implementation (2007), monetary penalties (day-fines) could replace short imprisonment sentences, helping reduce prison overcrowding.

== Architecture ==
=== Early prison buildings ===
Historically, prisons were housed in multipurpose buildings rather than purpose-built facilities. Early prison precursors were often integrated into larger institutional complexes, particularly hospitals. The city of Geneva constructed a general hospital from 1707 to 1713 (which became a courthouse in 1857), with a "discipline building" situated slightly set back, which returned to service in 1868 under the name prison Saint-Antoine. Similarly, the grand hospital of Bern (today the citizens' hospital) built from 1734 to 1742 combined an asylum, orphanage, and house of correction (Spinnstube). The sober, barracks-like buildings of disciplinary houses (Schellenwerke) also prefigured carceral architecture, as reflected in the nickname that became the official name of the Basel prison opened in 1864: Schällemätteli.

This architectural evolution accelerated during the nineteenth century when imprisonment began replacing other penalties and educational measures. Numerous bailiff residences were converted into prisons, including those of Saint-Jean (after serving as a hospice) and Thorberg in canton Bern. Prison architecture emerged as a distinct architectural genre as sentence execution became increasingly modulated with a view toward social reintegration.

=== Nineteenth century developments ===
The Enlightenment postulates regarding justice and punishment led to the development of new construction programs that prevailed in the nineteenth century. Large carceral and penitentiary buildings constructed on foreign models were characterized by individual cells, work rooms, and courtyards for walks. The cohabitation of several hundred prisoners necessitated the introduction of measures against escape and mutiny. To better supervise prisoners, buildings were constructed with radial wings equipped with narrow walkways leading to cells, easily supervised from the central hub (panoptic system). Numerous cantonal penitentiaries adopted the radial type:

- Geneva (two-wing building at right angles, constructed by Samuel Vaucher in 1822–1825, demolished in 1862), Lausanne (two-wing building on one axis, constructed by Adrien Pichard in 1819–1826, demolished in 1935)
- St. Gallen (three-wing building, constructed by Felix Wilhelm Kubly in 1836–1839, expanded in 1885 with two panoptic wings, demolished in 1958)
- Lucerne (three-wing building, constructed by Gustav Mossdorf in 1861–1862)
- Lenzburg (five-wing building, constructed by Robert Moser in 1864–1866)
- Basel (three-wing building, constructed by Robert Moser in 1860–1864)
- Neuchâtel (three-wing building constructed in 1867–1870 by Samuel Vaucher, demolished in 1956 and 1990)
- Regensdorf (four-wing building, constructed by Hermann Fietz the elder in 1899–1901, demolished in 1995–1997).

A chapel was often positioned above the central hub; workshops were located below or behind the cell rows. The Bern penitentiary had the form of a classic square (constructed in 1826–1836 by Johann Daniel Osterrieth, demolished in 1898), designed for 400 detainees, only a portion of whom were housed in individual cells. Most cantonal penitentiaries were built between 1820 and 1870 on the periphery of cantonal capitals. Large surrounding walls and barred windows, small and placed high, often oblong, of cellular wings revealed their function. Many have been demolished under pressure from urban growth or replaced by constructions intended for other types of sentence and measure execution.

District prisons annexed to prefectures often met a similar fate: while the Bienne prison has been preserved (constructed in 1886 by Franz Stempowski, became a regional prison), that of Lugano (constructed by Antonio De Filippis and Giuseppe Trezzini behind the court building, opened in 1873) was demolished.

=== Agricultural penitentiaries ===
By the nineteenth century, penitentiaries linked to agricultural exploitation existed, such as Thorberg (1850), Saint Johannsen (1883), Witzwil (1895), Hindelbank (1896, in the castle until 1961, then in new buildings), and Bellechasse (1898). Oberschöngrün (Biberist, 1924), Bochuz (1930, annex to the Plaine de l'Orbe colony founded in 1899), and Wauwilermoos (1949) were constructed in the twentieth century. Some of these buildings, including Bellechasse (reconstructed in 1915–1919 by Samuel Blaser), resembled barracks, but most were pavilion colonies. Witzwil, composed of five farms, was early considered an example of a semi-open establishment (individual cell block constructed in 1895, new buildings erected in 1980–1985).

=== Modern developments ===
The intercantonal concordats signed in 1956-1963 facilitated the establishment of a typology of carceral constructions according to sentence execution. The intercantonal penitentiary establishment of Bostadel (Menzingen, constructed in 1974–1977, according to a project by the Basel-City cantonal building office) consists of two small independent seven-story blocks; the median level is a sort of terrace surmounted by cells designed for 108 detainees. Pöschwies (Regensdorf, constructed in 1986–1988, expanded in 1997–1998) includes, besides a high-security quarter, sections reserved for drug addicts, ordinary detention, and semi-freedom regime.

Some twentieth century constructions are distinguished by their architectural value. Notable examples include:

- Saxerriet (Sennwald, three pavilions, constructed in 1962–1964 by Werner Gantenbein; annex addition and renovation in 1998–2002 by architects Aschwanden Schürer)
- Etablissement d'exécution des peines de Bellevue (Gorgier, constructed in 1974–1976 by Claude Rollier and Philippe Langel, contiguous staggered pavilions)
- La Tuillière (Lonay, constructed in 1989–1992 by Fonso Boschetti and Ivan Kolecek, pavilions aligned along a corridor).

== List ==
| Image | Name | Canton | Location | Function | Opened | Capacity | Notes | External links |
|---|---|---|---|---|---|---|---|---|
| | Bezirksgefängnis Aarau-Amtshaus | AG | Aarau | Multipurpose prison | 1936 | 42 | | |
| | Bezirksgefängnis Aarau-Telli | AG | Aarau | Pre-trial custody | 1985 | 14 | | |
| | Bezirksgefängnis Baden | AG | Baden | Pre-trial custody, short imprisonment | 1984 | 25 | | |
| | Bezirksgefängnis Bremgarten | AG | Bremgarten | Short imprisonment | 18th century | 8 | | |
| | Bezirksgefängnis Kulm | AG | Unterkulm | Pre-trial custody, imprisonment | 1991 | 23 | | |
| | Bezirksgefängnis Zofingen | AG | Zofingen | Pre-trial custody, imprisonment | 1997 | 30 | | |
| | Bezirksgefängnis Zurzach | AG | Zurzach | Pre-trial custody, imprisonment | 1967 | 13 | | |
| | Justizvollzugsanstalt Lenzburg | AG | Lenzburg | Multipurpose prison | 1864 | 190 | | Website; Media archive |
| | Stiftung Satis | AG | Seon | Indefinite incarceration, involuntary commitment, semi-liberty | 1956 | 9 | | Website |
| | Kantonales Gefängnis Appenzell Ausserrhoden | AR | Niederteufen | Pre-trial detention, extradition or expulsion detention | 2007 | 12 | | Website |
| | Strafanstalt Gmünden | AR | Niederteufen | Multipurpose prison | 1884 | 53 | | Website |
| | Strafanstalt Wauwilermoos | LU | Egolzwil | penitentiary and deportation | Established in 1940 as Wauwilermoos internment camp | 62 (2014) | | Website |
| | Untersuchungsgefängnis Trogen | AR | Trogen | Police and pre-trial detention | 1840 | 2 | | |
| | Witzwil | BE | Gampelen | Men's detention | 1995 | 200 | With a total agricultural land area of 612 hectares, the penitentiary is the largest farm in Switzerland | Website |
| | Établissements de la plaine de l'Orbe (EPO) | VD | Orbe | Imprisonment | 1930 | 330 | | |
| | Flughafengefängnis Abt. Ausschaffungshaft | ZH | Zürich Airport | Expulsion detention | 1995 | 106 | With a total of 214 places (both divisions), the airport prison is the canton's largest. | Website; Statistics |
| | Flughafengefängnis Abt. U-Haft und Strafvollzug | ZH | Zürich Airport | Pre-trial detention, imprisonment | 1995 | 108 | | Website; Statistics |
| | Gefängnis Affoltern am Albis | ZH | Affoltern am Albis | Imprisonment | 1973 | 65 | Specializes in reintegration, houses only prisoners with a short remaining sentence. | Website; Statistics |
| | Gefängnis Dielsdorf | ZH | Spitalstrasse 5, Dielsdorf | Pre-trial detention, imprisonment | 1960 | 64 | Specializes in the detention of women, particularly mothers. | Website; Statistics |
| | Gefängnis Horgen | ZH | Burghaldenstrasse 1, Horgen | Pre-trial detention, imprisonment | 1937 | 52 | Has a specialized youth detention unit. | Website; Statistics |
| | Gefängnis Meilen | ZH | Untere Bruech 141, Meilen | Pre-trial detention, imprisonment | 1954 | 35 | Smallest prison in the canton. | Website; Statistics |
| | Gefängnis Pfäffikon | ZH | Hörnlistrasse 55, Pfäffikon | Pre-trial detention, imprisonment | 1979 | 80 | Has a high security unit for six detainees. | Website; Statistics |
| | Gefängnis Winterthur | ZH | Hermann Götz-Strasse 22, Winterthur | Pre-trial detention, imprisonment | 1965 | 48 | Mainly used for pre-trial detention. | Website; Statistics |
| | Gefängnis Zürich | ZH | Rotwandstrasse 21, Zürich | Pre-trial detention, imprisonment | 1916 | 170 | Used almost only for pre-trial detention. | Website; Statistics |
| | Halbgefangenschaft Winterthur | ZH | Palmstrasse 2, Winterthur | Imprisonment, semi-detention | 1993 | 38 | Specializes in semi-detention. | Website; Statistics |
| | Haus Lägern | ZH | Lindenweg 30, Regensdorf | Semi-detention | 1998 | 30 | Semi-detention division of the Strafanstalt Pöschwies. | Website; Statistics |
| | Kolonie Ringwil | ZH | Koloniestrasse 2, Hinwil | Imprisonment, semi-detention | 1881 | 60 | Part of the Strafanstalt Pöschwies. | Website; Statistics |
| | Massnahmenzentrum Uitikon | ZH | Zürcherstrasse 100, Uitikon-Waldegg | Imprisonment, educative measures | 1874 | 48 | Centre for youth offenders. | Website; Statistics |
| | Polizeigefängnis Zürich | ZH | Kasernenstrasse 29, Zürich | Police and pre-trial detention | 1995 | 141 | Provisional police detention centre. | Statistics |
| | Strafanstalt Pöschwies | ZH | Roosstrasse 49, Regensdorf | Imprisonment, indefinite incarceration | 1995 | 436 | Largest prison in Switzerland. | Website; Statistics |
| | Vollzugszentrum Urdorf | ZH | In den Luberzen 18, Urdorf | Imprisonment | 1987 | 49 | Specializes in brief detentions ordered in lieu of fines. Closes in 2010. | Website; Statistics |
| | zsge-Neugut | ZH | Neugutstrasse 8, Urdorf | Semi-detention | 1964 | 13 | Semi-detention and resocialization centre operated by a private foundation. | Website; Statistics |
