= Orbe penitentiary complex =

Penitentiary complex in Orbe, Canton of Vaud, Switzerland

Établissements de la plaine de l'Orbe
- Interactive map of Établissements de la plaine de l'Orbe
- Location: Orbe; 46.735°N 6.554°E
- Status: open

The Orbe penitentiary complex or Établissements de la plaine de l'Orbe (EPO) form a Swiss penitentiary complex located in the municipality of Orbe in the Canton of Vaud. Designed for sentence execution, they consist of the Bochuz Penitentiary, the Closed Colony, and the Open Colony.

== Description ==
The Orbe penitentiary complex are a group of three penitentiary structures for sentence execution. They are located in the territory of the Swiss municipality of Orbe (Vaud).

The Bochuz Penitentiary is the central facility of the group. It is designed to house inmates under high-security conditions. It is complemented by a medium-security detention facility, the Closed Colony, and a low-security facility, the Open Colony.

In 2017, a project was launched for the construction of a new facility within the complex, in the area known as Grands marais. Intended for both pretrial detention and sentence execution, the facility is planned to have 410 spaces. The total cost of the project is estimated at 280 million Swiss francs.

The project is planned to be carried out in two phases, allowing for the rapid creation of 216 spaces by 2025. This decision aims to alleviate overcrowding in Vaud's penitentiary facilities, particularly the Bois-Mermet Prison in Lausanne.

== History ==
=== Béthusy Penitentiary ===
The history of Vaud’s penitentiary system dates back to the early 19th century. Under the Ancien Régime, the Lausanne prison was integrated into the premises of the Mercerie Hospital, while dangerous criminals were sent to serve their sentences at the Schallenwerk in Bern. With Vaud’s independence and the creation of the Canton of Vaud, the canton needed to establish its own facilities, including prisons. Discussions on crime repression, punishment, and rehabilitation were in full swing around 1820. Two radically different approaches clashed: the Pennsylvania prison system, which advocated complete solitary confinement, and the Auburn system, implemented at the Auburn Correctional Facility (New York State), which promoted workshop labor in silence. In the Canton of Vaud, after lengthy discussions and numerous preparatory projects, the Vaud penitentiary was finally built in the Béthusy district, above Lausanne. Constructed between 1819 and 1826 by Adrien Pichard, Vaud’s first cantonal engineer, the facility was briefly one of the most modern in Europe. It incorporated elements of both systems mentioned above. It operated until 1929, and the buildings were demolished in 1935.

=== Colony of the Orbe ===
In 1871, Vaud’s prisons were reorganized, and the government adopted the theories of Walter Crofton, who advocated a progressive system with three stages of punishment. The former Béthusy Penitentiary proved ill-suited to this principle, prompting considerations for its reconstruction. From a moral and educational perspective, agricultural work in the open air was recommended. After much debate, a decision was made in the late 19th century to establish a Colony in Orbe, a project that went hand in hand with the reclamation of the Orbe Plain. In 1877, a simple wooden barracks, fully enclosed, housed the first inmates. In 1898, a cellular building based on the panopticon system was constructed in three phases. The first wing was completed in 1898–1899, complementing the small “central prison” built in 1897. The second wing was built in 1906, and the third in 1911.

In 1923, an architectural competition was held for an agricultural penitentiary after gathering information on the penitentiaries of Bellechasse Prison (Canton of Fribourg) and Witzwil (Canton of Bern). The goal was to create a facility offering multiple confinement systems based on inmate classification. Twenty-five projects were reviewed by the jury, but despite awarding two first prizes, none could be implemented. The State Buildings Service then revised the entire program. The concept shifted to a primarily industrial facility with enclosed workshops around a large courtyard that could be cultivated.

Influenced by Anglo-Saxon prisons (Saughton, 1919, and Greenock in Edinburgh), the perimeter wall was abandoned, replaced by the buildings themselves, with the complex surrounded only by simple fencing.

In 1926, Lausanne architect Alphonse Laverrière (one of the previous competition’s winners) was invited to contribute to new plans. Construction was completed in 1930 with a very simple flat-roofed building. The system advocated by Crofton, allowing progression from cellular isolation to workshop labor and then communal living, was quickly modified or abandoned. However, the panopticon principle was retained, with a main building overlooking symmetrically arranged cellular wings, with galleries around a central void and zenithal lighting.

In 2017, after over twenty years of delays, the government promised the opening of a new facility in Orbe, initially planned for 2015.

== Notable events ==
Singer Johnny Hallyday and comedian Raymond Devos performed at the Bochuz Penitentiary in 1974. They took the opportunity to meet with inmates and inquire about their incarceration conditions. Two inmates escaped from the penitentiary in 1984. Their escape ended tragically a few hours later.

Starting in 1997, an ecumenical pastoral council was established within the Bochuz Penitentiary. Its goal is to promote religious and spiritual practices in the prison environment.

In 2008, an inmate climbed onto the roof of the Bochuz Penitentiary to protest his incarceration conditions and difficulties accessing medical care (treatment for a toothache). Skander Vogt—who would die months later in tragic circumstances—remained on the roof for several hours before being subdued by police.

In 2010, inmate Skander Vogt died following the intentional setting of his mattress on fire. The incident shocked public opinion and led to significant changes at the Bochuz Penitentiary.

A commando attacked the complex, specifically the penitentiary, on the evening of 2013 to facilitate the escape of two inmates (including a member of the Pink Panthers).

In the second half of 2013, 80 new detention spaces were created within the Colony.

Béatrice Métraux, the Vaud State Councillor responsible for penitentiary matters, launched a project in 2018 to build a new 410-space facility near the EPO complex. Intended for both pretrial detention and sentence execution, the new prison aims to alleviate overcrowding in existing facilities and eventually allow the closure of the Bois-Mermet Prison in Lausanne.

In 2019, the priest Guy Gilbert, known for his work on prison issues, visited the facility.

=== Detention costs ===
The estimated standard detention cost at the Orbe penitentiary complex ranges between 330 and 375 Swiss francs per day per inmate. This figure reaches 810 Swiss francs for solitary confinement under maximum-security conditions, such as at the Bochuz Penitentiary.

Due to intercantonal agreements, the French- and Italian-speaking cantons place their inmates in other cantons’ facilities based on available spaces. It appears that these detention costs for intercantonal placements were underestimated for many years. The Canton of Vaud notably “subsidized” the placement of inmates from other cantons at the Bochuz Penitentiary.

=== Death of Skander Vogt ===
During the night of 10 to 2010, an inmate—Skander Vogt—set fire to his cell and died hours later, asphyxiated by the smoke. The investigation revealed the passivity of the guards who, after extinguishing the fire, refused to open the cell to rescue the young man for over an hour, despite repeated requests from paramedics and a doctor from the SMUR present on site. As Skander Vogt was considered a dangerous prisoner, only the Vaud gendarmerie’s intervention group, DARD, could intervene in incidents involving him. The subsequent trial highlighted the rigid functioning of the Bochuz Penitentiary and failures in communication, leading guards to adhere strictly to hierarchy and procedures without discernment or initiative.

A few months earlier, in 2008, Skander Vogt had climbed onto the penitentiary’s roof to protest his detention conditions, requiring police intervention. Suffering from psychological issues stemming from childhood, the man was held under indefinite internment despite being sentenced to 20 months of detention. He struggled with the length and strictness of his detention regime, becoming increasingly violent and accustomed to verbal and physical altercations with prison staff.

In 2010, the newspaper Le Matin published excerpts of phone recordings between guards and police officers, in which they were heard laughing and insulting the young man. What had initially been presented as a suicide became a major scandal, covered by French media such as RTL, Le Monde, Le Figaro, and Le Journal du Dimanche.

The trial took place in 2013 before the Broye and North Vaud Tribunal. Nine penitentiary and medical staff members were charged with negligent homicide, a charge that could not be substantiated during the proceedings. The verdict resulted in the conviction of the deputy chief guard on duty that night for failure to provide assistance.

The case impacted the penitentiary and shocked public opinion. Following this tragedy, a significant restructuring of the penitentiary’s organization, particularly the internment regime, was undertaken.

=== Deaths within the facility ===
A 52-year-old Swiss man died in his cell in the Closed Colony in 2016. The investigation favored the hypothesis of suicide.

In 2020, a 28-year-old man was found dead in his cell, likely due to suicide.

=== Detention conditions and non-violent prisoner protests ===
At the beginning of 2014, several inmates began a hunger strike after the penitentiary administration rejected their demands regarding food. The men protested against the insufficient quantity and quality of food at the penitentiary, stating that the portions were too small, forcing them to buy additional food. The Vaud penitentiary service responded that meal quality met applicable standards but noted that checks were underway regarding portion sizes.

In early 2016, a non-violent prisoner movement affected the penitentiary. Several inmates contacted the press, notably the newspaper 24 Heures, and criticized the facility’s operations. They reported a large-scale drug and phone trafficking operation within the facility and highlighted the tensions it caused. These revelations shed light on the communal tensions within the penitentiary at the time.

In this context, the Vaud Gendarmerie arrested an inmate and a guard in early June. The two were suspected of organizing drug and phone trafficking within the facility: the guard smuggled items and substances in, and the inmate resold them.

In 2017, Vaud political authorities received a protest letter from the penitentiary’s inmates. They denounced their detention conditions and demanded the director’s resignation. In their letter, the prisoners criticized the arbitrary nature of sanctions (they could not be heard in administrative procedures), regretted the reduction of soccer sessions, and, along with their lawyers, protested the installation of a camera in a visiting room.

Following this letter, the authorities launched an administrative investigation. In the following weeks, criticisms highlighted certain dysfunctions. Shortcomings in inmates’ social support and training programs were pointed out, raising concerns about the effectiveness of rehabilitation and recidivism prevention efforts. The director left his position a few weeks later, in 2018.

In autumn 2019, inmates at the Orbe penitentiary complex, supported by their lawyers, complained about a new phone system introduced in the spring of the same year. According to them, the system significantly increased phone call costs and made it impossible to call certain numbers. The facility’s management stated that the new phone payment system was implemented for security reasons: the old system was outdated for managing judicial call restrictions applied to certain inmates, for example.

=== Escapes ===
Jacques Fasel, a member of the Fasel Gang, escaped from the Bochuz Penitentiary in 1981.

On 1984, inmates Jeronimo Arnay-Aviles and Manuel Canelo escaped from the penitentiary. Having managed to smuggle one or two weapons into the facility, they overpowered the guards in the tool handle manufacturing workshop and took a guard hostage. Upon reaching the penitentiary’s gate, they forced it open and took a second hostage, a 43-year-old seed salesman. After a chase and barricading themselves in a hangar at the Lausanne Airfield, the two men were arrested. A police inspector was killed during the operation, and one of the hostages was injured on the scalp. The guard was released.

On the evening of 2013, a violent escape shook the Bochuz Penitentiary, with two inmates escaping. Two accomplices outside the facility’s perimeter launched an assault around 7:35 p.m. Using two vehicles, they crushed barbed wire and created an escape path with ladders. They also fired automatic weapons at the guards to intimidate them. Meanwhile, two inmates—Adrian Albrecht, a 52-year-old repeat offender from Valais, and a 34-year-old Bosnian member of the Pink Panthers—joined them. The two accomplices were arrested and tried in the following months, as was Adrian Albrecht

In 2019, an inmate exploited a flaw in the facility’s fencing system to escape from the Orbe penitentiary complex. He was recaptured minutes later by penitentiary staff.

=== COVID-19 pandemic ===
During the COVID-19 pandemic in Switzerland in 2020 and 2021, the Orbe penitentiary complex was affected and had to adapt their penitentiary operations. During the first wave in spring 2020, no inmates tested positive for COVID-19. However, in September, an inmate at the Bochuz Penitentiary contracted the disease. This case prompted authorities to implement isolation measures to limit the risk of virus spread within the facility and from outside. In December, at the peak of the second wave, Vaud penitentiary authorities placed the Établissements de la plaine de l'Orbe in quarantine. This measure included closing work workshops and suspending visits and family parlors.

== See also ==
=== Bibliography ===
- Henri Anselmier. Les prisons vaudoises (1798-1871) [Vaud prisons (1798-1871)]. Bibliothèque historique vaudoise 77 (in French). Vol. 77. Bibliothèque historique vaudoise. p. 422.
- Paul Bissegger (2019). Ponts et Pensées. Adrien Pichard (1790-1841), premier ingénieur cantonal [Bridges and Thoughts. Adrien Pichard (1790-1841), first cantonal engineer]. Bibliothèque historique vaudoise (in French). Vol. 147. Lausanne: Bibliothèque historique vaudoise. p. 768. ISBN 978-2-88454-147-3.
- Daniel Morerod; Olivier Silberstein (2019). Au trou! Perspectives romandes sur les prisons d'hier et d'aujourd'hui [To the slammer! Romand perspectives on prisons past and present] (in French). Lausanne: Societè dìHistoire de la Suisse Romande.
- Catherine Schmutz-Nicod (2020). "Établissements de la plaine de l'Orbe. Chronique d'une prison dans les champs" [Établissements de la plaine de l’Orbe. Chronicle of a prison in the fields]. Monuments vaudois (in French). 10: 57–65. ISSN 1664-3011.
