= Louisette Buchard-Molteni =

Swiss activist and artist (1933–2004)

- Born: Louise Molteni; June 18, 1933; Lausanne, Switzerland
- Died: March 7, 2004 (aged 70); Lausanne, Switzerland
- Occupations: Artist, activist
- Known for: Advocacy for recognition of wrongs suffered by placed children

Louisette Buchard-Molteni (born Louise Molteni; 18 June 1933 – 7 March 2004) was a Swiss artist and activist who was subjected to coercive measures for assistance purposes and extra-familial placements as a child. She became one of the earliest survivors to publicly campaign for official recognition of the wrongs suffered by placed children in Switzerland, and among the first to publish a personal testimony on the subject.

== Life ==
=== Childhood and placements ===
Louisette Molteni was the youngest of five daughters of Giovanni Molteni, a Ticinese entrepreneur of Italian origin, and Luigia née Longhi. After her parents divorced in 1938, her mother placed her in the orphanage of La Providence in Fribourg (1938–1940). At the age of eight, following the death of her father, she was placed at the Ricovero per l'infanzia abbandonata Erminio von Mentlen (1941–1948) in Bellinzona, on account of her Ticinese origins, where she was required to learn Italian. She was subsequently transferred from institution to institution until she came of age, including the reformatories San Girolamo Emiliani in Faido and Bon Pasteur in Villars-les-Joncs (where she relearned French), a foster family in Brunnen (where she learned Swiss German), the cantonal neuropsychiatric hospital in Mendrisio, and the prisons of Lugano, Altstätten, and Bellechasse. She experienced 13 placements between 1948 and 1953 without having committed any offense. She was also placed as a domestic worker in Zurich and in workers' residences in Lugano. Throughout this period she was subjected to arbitrary decisions and physical, psychological, medical, and sexual violence, as well as unpaid forced labor including cleaning and textile work.

=== Adult life ===
In 1954, a few months after reaching civil majority (age 20), Molteni gave birth to her first child alone, the father having refused any involvement. Two years later, she married Gaston Buchard, a pastry baker. Together they ran two businesses in Lausanne. The couple had one daughter.

== Activism ==
After years of silence about her experiences, Louisette Buchard-Molteni began her campaign in 1972 with a first letter, which went unanswered, addressed to the federal and Ticinese authorities requesting explanations for the mistreatment she had suffered during her childhood. She also carried out archival research into her family and origins. From the 1980s onward, she conducted notable militant actions in Lausanne, widely covered by the media, to denounce the injustices suffered by children placed in families or institutions and to demand a historical inquiry. One such action, initiated in 1982 and repeated until around 1990, involved climbing a construction crane to unfurl a banner and distribute leaflets bearing the slogan "For whom is justice made in Switzerland?" She undertook several hunger strikes; her last, in October 2003, was a protest against the abandonment of the Simon motion (filed in 1999 by Vaud Christian Democratic National Councillor Jean Charles Simon, later converted into a postulate) calling for the establishment of an independent commission of inquiry into child placements.

Buchard-Molteni was one of the first affected persons to give public testimony by publishing an autobiography in 1995, Le tour de Suisse en cage (Switzerland in a Cage: The Stolen Childhood of Louisette). She also denounced the fate of placed children through drawings and paintings, which were exhibited at the hall of the Lausanne University Hospital (1989), at the École d'études sociales et pédagogiques in Lausanne (2000), and at the Musée de Pully (2001).

Her engagement was instrumental in launching the first research project in Switzerland on the history of extra-familial placements: an exploratory research mandate co-funded by the Swiss Federal Office for Education and Science and the canton of Vaud. The results were published in 2005, a few months after her death.

== Bibliography ==
=== Works ===
Buchard-Molteni, Louisette: Le tour de Suisse en cage. L'enfance volée de Louisette, 1995.

=== Archival holdings ===
Archives cantonales vaudoises, Chavannes-près-Renens: Archives personnelles de Louisette Buchard-Molteni; Les orphelins suisses: «Le tour de Suisse en cage».

=== Secondary literature ===
- Heller, Geneviève; Avvanzino, Pierre; Lacharme, Cécile: Enfance sacrifiée. Témoignages d'enfants placés entre 1930 et 1970, 2005.
- «… je vous fais une lettre». Retrouver dans les archives la parole et le vécu des personnes internées, 2019 (Publications de la Commission indépendante d'experts Internements administratifs, 4).
- «… so wird man ins Loch geworfen». Histoire de l'internement administratif: sources, 2019, pp. 167–172 (Publications de la Commission indépendante d'experts Internements administratifs, 9).
- La mécanique de l'arbitraire. Internements administratifs en Suisse 1930–1981. Rapport final, 2019 (Publications de la Commission indépendante d'experts Internements administratifs, 10).
- Droux, Joëlle; Praz, Anne-Françoise: Placés, déplacés, protégés? L'histoire du placement d'enfants en Suisse, XIXe–XXe siècles, 2021.
- Nardone, Marco: «Bisogna portare alla luce queste sofferenze!». I collocamenti coatti all'istituto von Mentlen di Bellinzona (1932–1962), 2024.
- Nardone, Marco: Jeunesses marginalisées et institution psychiatrique: le cas des internements forcés des mineur.es dans le canton du Tessin (1945–1985) (forthcoming).
