= Administrative detention in Switzerland =

Detention without trial, 19th century–1981

- Period: Mid-19th century – 1981
- Legal basis: Cantonal administrative law, Federal guardianship law (from 1912)
- Estimated victims: At least 60,000 people (20th century)
- Abolished: 1981 (replaced by deprivation of liberty for assistance purposes)
- Rehabilitation law: 2014

Administrative detention in Switzerland was a practice involving the deprivation of liberty in institutions, ordered by cantonal administrative authorities, typically for indefinite periods. From the mid-19th century, it was used as a sanctioning mechanism by assistance, guardianship, and alcoholism prevention services with the aim of improving and disciplining individuals through social control.

The practice was based on cantonal administrative law and, from 1912, on federal guardianship law. It required neither criminal offense nor judicial procedure, with deprivation of personal liberty justified by individuals' lifestyle and perceived threats to public order. The legally problematic nature and arbitrary execution of these measures faced repeated criticism throughout their existence. In 1981, deprivation of liberty for assistance purposes replaced the former detention laws. In 2014, Parliament rehabilitated former detainees and launched a process of reparation and historical analysis.

== Legal and conceptual evolution ==
The definition of administrative detention in legal history involves considerable ambiguity, raising questions about its delimitation from criminal and civil law measures, psychiatric hospitalizations, or migration law sanctions. In the 19th century, the adjective "administrative" was used primarily to differentiate it from criminal penalties and referred to competence (administrative authorities) or procedure (through administrative channels).

The coexistence of cantonal and federal legislative provisions created a patchwork of regulations. Administrative detention first appeared in the mid-19th century as a sanctioning mechanism for public assistance, beginning with decrees in Grisons (1839 and 1840), Thurgau (1849), and Lucerne (1872). The moralization of mass poverty and the overload of existing support systems formed the backdrop for these measures.

Administrative detention initially developed in German-speaking Switzerland. The French-speaking cantons and Ticino followed later, placing greater emphasis on alcoholism prevention (Vaud in 1906, Fribourg in 1919 and 1924, Valais in 1926, Ticino in 1929). In the first half of the 20th century, administrative detention became a widespread means of social control, targeting individuals who did not conform to contemporary social norms, rebelled against authorities, guardians, or parents, or fell through the cracks of social protection.

The guardianship law of the Swiss Civil Code, adopted by the Federal Assembly in 1907, and expanded cantonal detention laws (such as Bern in 1912, Zürich in 1925, Fribourg in 1942) allowed for the deprivation of liberty of "outsiders." By World War II, all cantons except Geneva had forms of administrative detention.

The first cantons repealed their laws in 1942 when the Swiss Criminal Code came into force (such as Aargau and Zug), others followed in the 1970s (such as Vaud, St. Gallen, and Schwyz). Elsewhere, legislation remained unchanged until 1981 (such as Zürich and Fribourg).

== Practice and execution ==
The disparate legal situation also influenced practice. Detention decisions were made sometimes by cantonal governments, sometimes by administrative bodies at the district or municipal level. Vaud was an exception, as competence was entrusted to specialized commissions. The guardianship authority decided on administrative detentions based on the Civil Code.

The often rudimentary legal framework, vague legal concepts such as "laziness," "misconduct," or "negligence," and limited procedural rights gave authorities (composed partly of non-professionals) excessive discretionary powers and led to arbitrary and disproportionate violations of personal liberty.

For authorities, administrative detention was a means of pressure and sanction used variably to encourage cooperation from individuals in conflict situations, impose social norms, and reinforce established hierarchies. It was also used as an inexpensive emergency solution in the absence of more appropriate alternatives.

=== Institutions and conditions ===
Administrative detention was generally carried out in closed institutions with mandatory work obligations (prisons, forced labor establishments). Unlike criminal imprisonment, its duration was generally not predetermined but depended on the institution's management, creating great uncertainty for placed individuals. Detentions lasting up to two years were common and could sometimes last longer, particularly for minors or repeat offenders.

Special forced labor establishments were created for executing measures, such as Fürstenau (1840), Kalchrain at Hüttwilen (1849), and Bitzi at Mosnang (1871). In the 20th century, the range of institutions expanded to include poorhouses, establishments for alcoholics, and reform houses, as well as district prisons and psychiatric clinics for short-term transfers.

Many establishments, particularly multi-purpose complexes like Bellechasse, Realta, or Hindelbank for women, also served for criminal sentence execution. Detention with forced labor was organized in many places in such a way that it was perceived as punitive by those placed there. Sanitary conditions, food, medical care, and working conditions were precarious until the 1960s.

== Target groups and social impact ==
According to estimates, at least 60,000 people, adults and partly minors, were subjected to administrative detention in the 20th century alone. The measures reached their peak between 1930 and 1945, then gradually decreased. In the 1970s, an average of 250 people per year were forced into such detention, with about 80% being men.

Research explains this gender disparity by the fact that men and women were exposed to different social expectations and forms of social control. Due to their assigned role as family breadwinners, men were more strongly and quickly confronted with accusations of "laziness," neglect of support duties, or excessive alcohol consumption. In contrast, reproaches directed at women mainly targeted the domain of sexuality.

=== Social characteristics ===
Administrative detention primarily, but not exclusively, targeted individuals from the working classes, particularly those with little social support or precarious working conditions. Marital status (single, divorced) and belonging to an "incomplete" or dysfunctional family constituted other risk factors. Often these were people stigmatized and excluded by their environment as marginal, such as single mothers, placed children, Yenish and Sinti, or those who opposed authority interventions.

The measures, even though they aimed to promote social and economic integration, often severely worsened the exclusion of vulnerable individuals. Institutional confinement destroyed social bonds, caused interruptions in professional life, and increased the risk of poverty. The stigmatization made reintegration more difficult, and the absence of post-release follow-up worsened the risk of falling into a spiral of precariousness from which they could hardly escape.

== Criticism and reform ==
Administrative detention faced criticism regarding its compatibility with the rule of law from its 19th-century introduction. In the 20th century, essayist Carl Albert Loosli, feminist activist Emilie Gourd, and lawyers like Paul Golay and Gaudenz Canova renewed criticism of "administrative justice," though this did not bring lasting changes.

Awareness of the phenomenon only intensified in the 1960s, with legal representatives and media expressing criticism of the disproportionality of administrative detention and its disguised punitive character. However, only international pressure, before ratification of the European Convention on Human Rights (1974), and pressure from the International Labour Organization, which classified administrative measures as a prohibited form of forced labor, led to fundamental reform.

In 1981, the revision of the Civil Code established new regulations taking into account Switzerland's international law obligations and emphasizing the medical and assistance character of deprivations of liberty outside criminal law. Cantonal administrative detention laws were thus replaced by deprivation of liberty for assistance purposes (fürsorgerische Freiheitsentziehung, FFE), whose scope was limited to cases where necessary personal assistance could not be provided otherwise.

== Memory work and rehabilitation ==
Federal Act on the Rehabilitation of Persons Placed by Administrative Decision
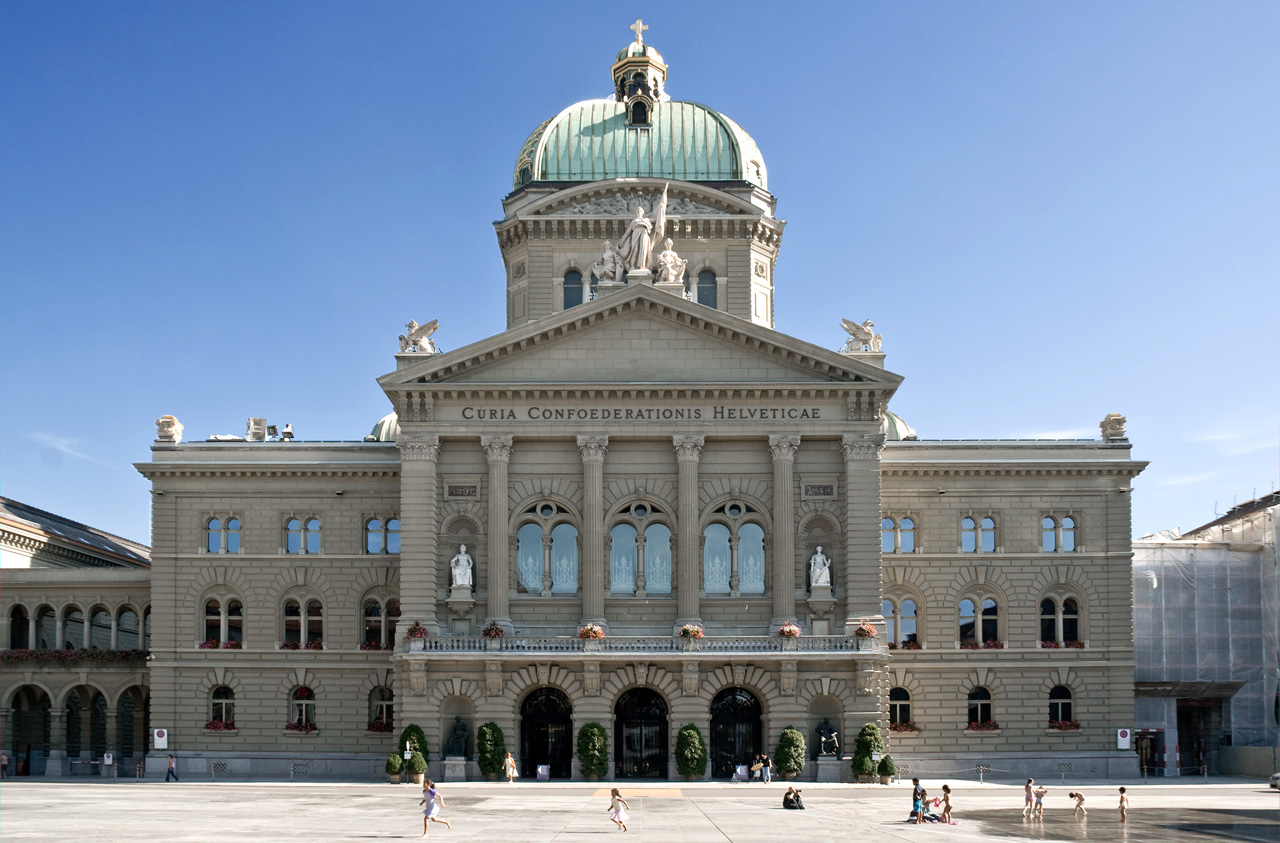

Federal Assembly of Switzerland
- Long title: (SR 211.223.12)
- Territorial extent: Switzerland
- Enacted by: Federal Assembly of Switzerland
- Enacted: 21 March 2014
- Commenced: 1 August 2014
- Repealed: 1 April 2017 (replaced by Federal Act on Compulsory Social Measures and Placements prior to 1981)
- Status: Repealed

Until the 1990s, both public criticism and political memory work on state coercion for assistance purposes focused on the persecution of the Yenish by the "Kinder der Landstrasse" organization. Through mobilization by people who had been subjected to administrative detention and out-of-family placement—initially supported by Schweizer Beobachter, then by research and political and administrative authorities—a broad debate could be conducted from the 2000s on reparation for damages suffered.

In 2010, a commemorative ceremony took place at Hindelbank penitentiary, during which Federal Councilor Eveline Widmer-Schlumpf presented the Confederation's apologies to people formerly victims of administrative detention. This event marked an important turning point in the process of historical and political memory work concerning other coercive measures.

In 2014, Parliament adopted the Federal Act on the Rehabilitation of Persons Placed by Administrative Decision (Note: German: Bundesgesetz über die Rehabilitierung administrativ versorgter Menschen; French: Loi fédérale sur la réhabilitation des personnes placées par décision administrative; Italian: Legge federale concernente la riabilitazione delle persone internate sulla base di una decisione amministrativa) and created an Independent Expert Commission (CIE) to study the issue scientifically, whose work concluded in 2019. The law was replaced in 2017 by the broader Federal Act on Compulsory Social Measures and Placements prior to 1981 (CSMPA).

== Contemporary detention practices ==
Despite the formal abolition of administrative detention in 1981, critics argue that similar practices continue under different legal frameworks, including pretrial detention, psychiatric commitment, and immigration detention.

In 2023, Switzerland detained 1,924 people in pretrial detention, with 46% of all prisoners being held in pretrial detention compared to 31% in France, 25% in Italy, and 20% in Germany. Additionally, over 18,000 people were involuntarily placed in psychiatric hospitals through assistance placement measures in 2022.

The analysis suggests that contemporary detention practices continue to disproportionately affect marginalized populations, including people in poverty, non-Swiss nationals, and individuals with mental health issues, echoing patterns from the era of administrative detention.
