= Gmünden Prison =

Correctional facility in Appenzell Ausserrhoden, Switzerland

Coordinates: 47.3862°N 9.3516°E

- Interactive map of Gmünden Prison
- Location: Teufen, Appenzell Ausserrhoden, Switzerland
- Status: Operational
- Capacity: 62
- Opened: 1884
- Managed by: Canton of Appenzell Ausserrhoden
- Director: Urs Schindler

Gmünden Prison (German: Strafanstalt Gmünden) is a correctional facility located in Teufen, Appenzell Ausserrhoden, Switzerland, with capacity for 62 inmates. Established in 1884, it serves the canton and neighboring regions under intercantonal agreements.

== Current operations ==
The facility operates under the management of the Canton of Appenzell Ausserrhoden's Department of Internal Affairs and Security. As of 2024, Gmünden Prison houses both male and female inmates, with a capacity that has consistently operated above 100% occupancy throughout recent years.

=== Work programs ===
Gmünden Prison operates extensive work programs in accordance with Article 81 of the Swiss Criminal Code, which mandates that inmates engage in productive labor. The facility maintains several workshops including a textile production unit, carpentry shop, gardening operations, and various industrial activities. Inmates produce items sold through an online platform, contributing to both their vocational training and the institution's operational funding.

The prison has developed specialty products including bags made from recycled firefighter equipment, seasonings and oils from facility-grown chili peppers, and wooden crafts. These items are sold at local markets and through online sales, providing inmates with practical work experience and modest compensation.

== History ==
=== Establishment and early years ===
The decision to establish Gmünden Prison was made by the Landsgemeinde of Appenzell Ausserrhoden in 1880, primarily to address the housing of individuals deemed "dissolute" and "work-shy" as a means of relieving local poorhouses. The facility was also designed to accommodate judicially sentenced individuals.

In 1883, the canton acquired property in Gmünden, southwest of Niederteufen, and constructed a new building designed to house 8 female and 40 male inmates. The facility became operational in 1884. Early infrastructure improvements included the installation of central heating in 1892, electric lighting in 1900, and shower facilities in 1935. A comprehensive renovation of all buildings was completed during the 1940s.

The original design reflected contemporary correctional philosophy, with barred windows and locked sleeping quarters at night, but notably without perimeter walls or fencing. Guards were unarmed, and the distinction between sentenced prisoners and administratively detained individuals was primarily indicated through different striped institutional clothing.

=== Administrative detention system ===
Between 1884 and 1976, Gmünden housed 1,252 individuals under administrative detention orders, representing 15% of the total 8,420 admissions during this period. Administrative detentions of up to three years were ordered by the cantonal government based on municipal recommendations, supported by institutional regulations from 1884 (last revised in 1969) and the cantonal poor law of 1934.

The administrative detention system was rarely challenged legally, with all five constitutional complaints filed by affected individuals in the 1940s and 1950s being rejected. A supervisory commission chaired by the justice director met twice annually at the facility to approve budgets, review petitions and complaints, decide on extended disciplinary measures, and recommend detention extensions for administrative cases.

The end of administrative detention under cantonal laws occurred in 1981, with the last external administrative detainees released in 1976 and the final Appenzell Ausserrhoden resident in 1969.

=== Economics ===
Until approximately 1950, Gmünden was largely financially self-sustaining through institutional enterprises and restrictive spending policies. Primary revenue sources included agricultural operations producing dairy, vegetables, and fruit, along with a tree nursery that operated until 2000. A textile mill operated until 1965, followed by various industrial activities including the manufacture of plastic bags and garbage bags. From 1970 onward, cost reimbursements from referring cantons and municipalities became a major funding source.

Inmates regularly worked in household duties, agriculture, and institutional workshops, as well as external harvest work and construction projects. The goal of full employment was maintained even through marginally profitable activities such as envelope gluing and gravel extraction. Work compensation was introduced in 1902, though amounts remained modest and were only distributed upon release as late as 1954.

=== Living conditions and discipline ===
Living conditions were poor until facility renovations in the 1940s, with inadequate hygiene facilities and winter room temperatures around 6 °C. Despite the 1877 Factory Act, weekly working hours reached 72 hours around 1900 and still exceeded 56 hours in 1970.

Corporal punishment including caning continued until 1894 despite legal prohibitions. Other disciplinary measures such as physical restraints, straitjackets, and head shaving following escape attempts persisted into the 1960s in some cases.

=== Reforms ===
Significant architectural changes occurred between 1961 and 1964 to comply with the 1942 Swiss Criminal Code and a 1956 concordat among eastern Swiss cantons requiring spatial separation of different inmate categories. Following these renovations, the facility ceased admitting female inmates until 2017.

Progressive reforms began in 1971 with the introduction of relationship leave, followed by semi-open correctional approaches in 1974 and semi-detention in 1980. In response to internal and external criticism of correctional practices, an ombudsman was appointed from among commission members in 1976, and social services were established during the 1980s.

A significant transformation occurred with the appointment of a new administrator in 1985, leading to a shift away from agricultural focus toward modern correctional practices. This transition culminated in Gmünden's evolution into a contemporary correctional institution, which since 2016 has operated under a mandate to generate profit.

=== Recent developments ===
The 2007 criminal law reform reintroduced the category of fine defaulters through substitute prison sentences. Under the 2005 Foreign Nationals and Integration Act, rejected asylum seekers and individuals without residence permits may be detained on administrative orders since 2008. In 2017, the facility reopened a women's section, marking a return to mixed-gender housing after more than five decades.
