= Fasel Gang =

- Founded: 1977
- Founding location: Fribourg
- Years active: 1977-1991
- Territory: Switzerland
- Membership: 3
- Activities: Robbery
- Notable members: Jacques Fasel, Daniel Bloch

The Fasel Gang was a group of Swiss criminals, mainly composed of Jacques Fasel, Daniel Bloch and a third sidekick, three accomplices that claimed to fight for anarchism and social justice.

This social demand earned Jacques Fasel the nickname Robin des Bolzes. A Bolze being an inhabitant of the lower town of Fribourg.

== History ==
Daniel Bloch met Jacques Fasel in 1977 at the Bellechasse penitentiary where they were both imprisoned for conscientious objection. Arrested after a first series of attacks, including one during which a money conveyor was killed, Jacques Fasel escaped from Tavel prison in June 1979. He was recaptured in Geneva in December 1979. In May 1981, Daniel Bloch was arrested in Paris then extradited to Switzerland, while Jacques Fasel escaped from Bochuz penitentiary on July 26, 1981 in the company of five other prisoners, thus avoiding appearing at his trial in August 1981. He was then sentenced to 20 years' imprisonment. In November 1981, the third associate was arrested in La Grande-Motte then extradited to Switzerland. Arrested in Paris in March 1982, Jacques Fasel was also extradited to Switzerland in the fall of 1982.

The trial of the three men was held in 1985. Daniel Bloch was sentenced to 10 ½ years in prison, the third sidekick to 12 ½ years and Jacques Fasel to 14 years. In 1986, the Friborg court annulled the judgment pronounced against Jacques Fasel and a new trial resulted in a 12-year prison sentence against him.

In the spring of 1987, Daniel Bloch published a book entitled La Bande à Fasel: Mythe et Réalités? retracing his career, he was imitated at the end of the year by Jacques Fasel, who published Droit de revolte.

In March 1988, Jacques Fasel managed to escape from Witzwil penitentiary, in the canton of Bern. He was recaptured in the fall near Balaruc-Le-Vieux on September 28, 1988 and then extradited to Switzerland in May 1989, after being tried in France for using false papers. His request for asylum in France was refused.

Jacques Fasel was released from prison on August 30, 1991.

=== List of the main attacks attributed to the Fasel Gang ===
- Heist at the Jumbo in Villars-sur-Glâne, October 2, 1978. A money conveyor was killed.
- Attack on the post office in La Coudre (NE), October 6, 1978.
- Attack on the postal train in the Val de Travers on November 27, 1978.
- Hold-up of the Post Office in Hauterive (Neuchâtel), November 28, 1978.
- Hold-up of the State Bank of Friborg Courtepin in the Canton of Fribourg, December 6, 1979.
- Hold-up of the Central Post Office in Neuchâtel, December 20, 1979. The group fled with a boat on Lake Neuchâtel to Marin-Epagnier.

== See also ==
- Anarchism in Switzerland

== Bibliography ==
- Bloch, Daniel (1987). La bande à Fasel: mythe et réalités ? (in French). Lausanne: L'Aire.
- Fasel, Jacques (1987). Droit de révolte (in French). Lausanne: Éditions d'en bas. ISBN 978-2-8290-0094-2.
- Wuthrich, Bernard (11 July 2007). "Quand le "Robin des Bolzes" semait la terreur en Suisse romande". Le Temps. No. 2916.
- Rocchillan, Ludovic (27 May 2019). "Pour Jacques Fasel, "les jeunes ont raison de manifester collectivement"". Radio Télévision Suisse.
