= Carl Albert Loosli =

Swiss writer (1877–1959)

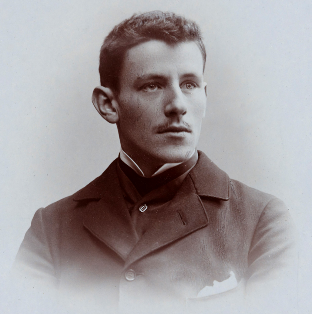
- Loosli around 1898
- Born: 5 April 1877; Schüpfen, Bern, Switzerland
- Died: 22 May 1959 (aged 82); Bümpliz, Bern, Switzerland
- Other names: Carl Trebla, Peter Schöps, Peter Lämmergeier (pseudonyms)
- Occupations: Writer; journalist
- Spouse: Ida Rosa Schneider (m. 1903)
- Parents: Carlo Bonnacio (father); Sophie Emma Loosli (mother)

Carl Albert Loosli (5 April 1877 – 22 May 1959) was a Swiss writer and an intellectual who intervened in politics, with an extensive body of literary and journalistic work. As a youth he was committed by administrative order to the penal institution in Trachselwald. In 1912 he founded the Swiss Writers' Association and became its first president. A fake study of 1913, in which he claimed that the works of Jeremias Gotthelf had been written by a farmer, led to his ostracism by the circles he had duped. Loosli campaigned against homes and detention institutions run like barracks and against antisemitism, and in 1934–1935 he was the court's expert in the Bern trial over the Protocols of the Elders of Zion.

== Biography ==
=== Early life ===
Carl Albert Loosli was born on 5 April 1877 in Schüpfen, the illegitimate son of Carlo Bonnacio, an Italian wine merchant from Saint-Imier, and Sophie Emma Loosli, a farmer's daughter. He grew up in Schüpfen with Annemarie Zweiacker, a cook and embroiderer. In 1889 he was placed under the guardianship of the commune of Sumiswald, which the courts lifted only in 1901, and housed in the Grandchamp home near Boudry. He had to break off his schooling there because of an eye condition. As he came into conflict with his guardians over the apprenticeships assigned to him, he was sent to various homes, and in 1895 he was finally committed by administrative order to the penal institution (Strafanstalt) in Trachselwald.

Released in 1897, Loosli led a bohemian life between Bern, the Emmental, Neuchâtel and Paris. He discovered the world of the arts, followed the Dreyfus affair at close quarters, was acquainted with Émile Zola, Ferdinand Hodler and Carl Vital Moor, and made a name for himself as a freelance writer and journalist. In 1903 he married Ida Rosa Schneider, daughter of Rosette Schneider, a midwife from Rüegsauschachen; her father is unknown. In 1904 he settled in Bümpliz.

=== Writer and public figure ===
Because of the critical positions he took as a man of letters, published in 1906 in the essay collection Bümpliz und die Welt (Bümpliz and the world), Jonas Fränkel called him the "philosopher of Bümpliz". In 1908 Loosli founded the Bümpliz workers' party (Bümplizer Arbeiterpartei) and worked as an editor of the Berner Tagwacht, but as early as 1909 he left the Social Democratic Party (SP) because of Robert Grimm's Marxist course. From 1908 to 1912 he was secretary of the Society of Swiss Painters, Sculptors and Architects (Gesellschaft Schweizerischer Maler, Bildhauer und Architekten). On its model, and drawing on his experience with copyright, he founded in 1912 the Swiss Writers' Association (Schweizerischer Schriftsteller-Verband), an organization of professional authors conceived as a trade union, and became its first president. In his warning pamphlet Ist die Schweiz regenerationsbedürftig? (Does Switzerland need regeneration?) of 1912, he questioned the purpose of a nation that threatened to give up its ideals in favor of a superficial materialism and of party politics marked by clinging to office.

The Gotthelf affair led to a scandal. As a poet, Loosli took offense at the speculation about the authenticity of Shakespeare's work, and he was annoyed by the "philological gossip" that, in his view, obscured the work of the authors. In 1913, in an article presented as scholarly, he claimed that the works of Gotthelf had been written not by Albert Bitzius but by Bitzius's friend, the farmer Johann Ulrich Geissbühler. The fake study was taken at face value in German-speaking Switzerland, while French-speaking Switzerland received it with a wink. Loosli had succeeded in leading the experts astray, but at the price of being ostracized by the circles he had duped, including parts of the press and the book trade. Thanks to support from French-speaking Switzerland and to his political and artistic networks, he was able to break through this exclusion again and again.

Loosli used the pseudonyms Carl Trebla, Peter Schöps and Peter Lämmergeier. As a writer, he worked mainly in three directions: he wrote fiction, art-historical studies, and tracts on social policy and education. His literary work includes many satires, couplets, poems and short stories, written in Standard German, French and the Emmental dialect. He initiated the edition of Gotthelf's works and was one of its editors until he fell out with the author's descendants. He was a friend of Carl Spitteler (Erinnerungen an Carl Spitteler, 1956) and of many visual artists, which led him to his art-historical studies. Among these, the four-volume Ferdinand Hodler. Leben, Werk und Nachlass (1921–1924) stands out. The Hodler archive he compiled, which he left in his will to the Musée des beaux-arts in Neuchâtel, later formed the basis for research at the Swiss Institute for Art Research in Zurich.

=== Social campaigns ===
With the tract Anstaltsleben (Life in institutions, 1924), Loosli opened his campaign against homes and detention institutions run like barracks, and for a fundamental reform of schooling. Later he also campaigned successfully for the Verdingkinder (contract children). In 1939 he published "Administrativjustiz" und Schweizerische Konzentrationslager ("Administrative justice" and Swiss concentration camps), but he did not succeed in assembling the political coalition needed to end the practice of compulsory commitment (Zwangsversorgung).

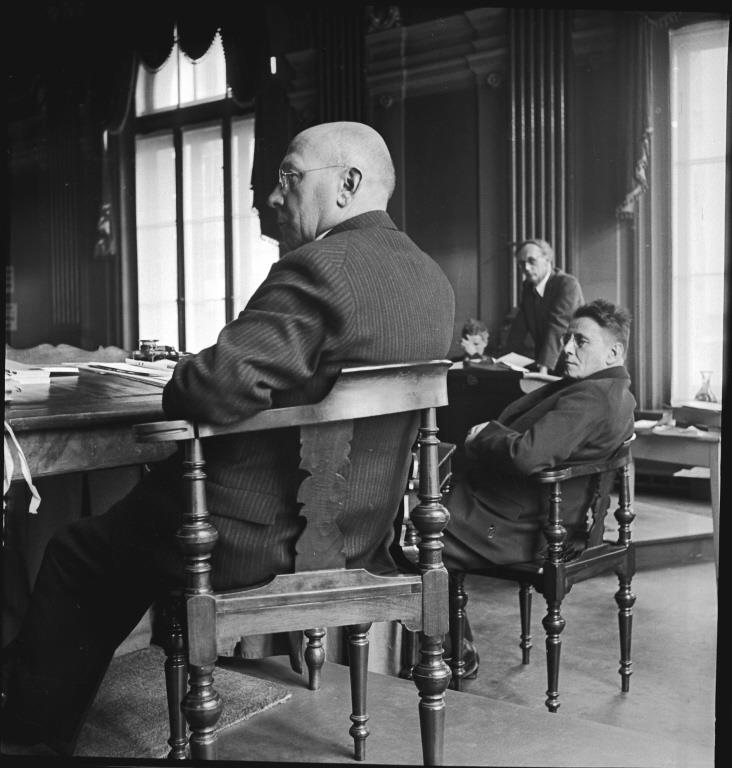
Loosli (seated) at the Bern trial over the Protocols of the Elders of Zion, 10 May 1935. Photograph by Carl Jost.

With Die schlimmen Juden! (The wicked Jews!, 1927), a work supported by the Swiss Federation of Jewish Communities, Loosli fought antisemitism; in Die Juden und wir (The Jews and us, 1930) he distanced himself from his earlier demand for the assimilation of the Jews. In 1934–1935 he was the court's expert in the Bern trial over the Protocols of the Elders of Zion, and after the war he paved the way for Christian–Jewish working groups (christlich-jüdische Arbeitsgemeinschaften). With publications such as Umschalten oder Gleichschalten? (1934) and Demokratie und Charakter (1936), and with the targeted publication of secret Nazi documents during the campaign over Arthur Fonjallaz's fascist initiative against Freemasonry in 1937, he strengthened the will of the democratic forces to resist the Third Reich.

Loosli died in Bümpliz on 22 May 1959.

== Legacy ==
For a long time, the reception of Loosli's work focused mainly on his dialect literature (for example Mys Ämmitaw!, 1911) and on his legal and crime novel Die Schattmattbauern (written in 1926, first published as a book in 1932). Only the biography, published long after his death, and the seven-volume edition of his works gradually brought the enormous range of his thought and work back into view. The Carl Albert Loosli Society (Carl-Albert-Loosli-Gesellschaft), founded in 2001, keeps his memory alive, and its bulletin, published since 2010, shows the many ways in which his visionary ideas relate to the present.

== Works ==
- Fredi Lerch and Erwin Marti (eds.), Werke. Carl Albert Loosli, 2006–2009
- Pedro Lenz, Loosli für die Jackentasche. Geschichten, Gedichte und Satiren, 2010

== Bibliography ==
- Walther Killy (ed.), Literatur-Lexikon. Autoren und Werke deutscher Sprache, vol. 7, 1990, 344–345
- Erwin Marti, Carl Albert Loosli 1877–1959, 4 vols., 1996–2018
- Erwin Marti, "Die Kunstmacht. Ferdinand Hodler, Carl Albert Loosli und die GSMBA", in Oskar Bätschmann, Matthias Frehner and Hans-Jörg Heusser (eds.), Ferdinand Hodler. Die Forschung, die Anfänge, die Arbeit, der Erfolg, der Kontext, 2009, 217–230
- Carl-Albert-Loosli-Gesellschaft (ed.), Carl Albert Loosli aktuell, no. 1–, 2010–
- Gregor Spuhler (ed.), Anstaltsfeind und Judenfreund. Carl Albert Looslis Einsatz für die Würde des Menschen, 2013
- Dariusz Komorowski, Ein Intellektueller im Narrenhabitus. Carl Albert Looslis Publizistik in der nationalen Identitätsdebatte der Schweiz um 1900, 2014
- Michael Hagemeister, Die "Protokolle der Weisen von Zion" vor Gericht. Der Berner Prozess 1933–1937 und die "antisemitische Internationale", 2017

=== Archives ===
- Archiv für Zeitgeschichte, ETH Zurich
- Musée d'art et d'histoire Neuchâtel
- Swiss Literary Archives, Bern: personal papers (Nachlass)
