= Altdorf–Flüelen tramway =

Tramway line in Uri, Switzerland

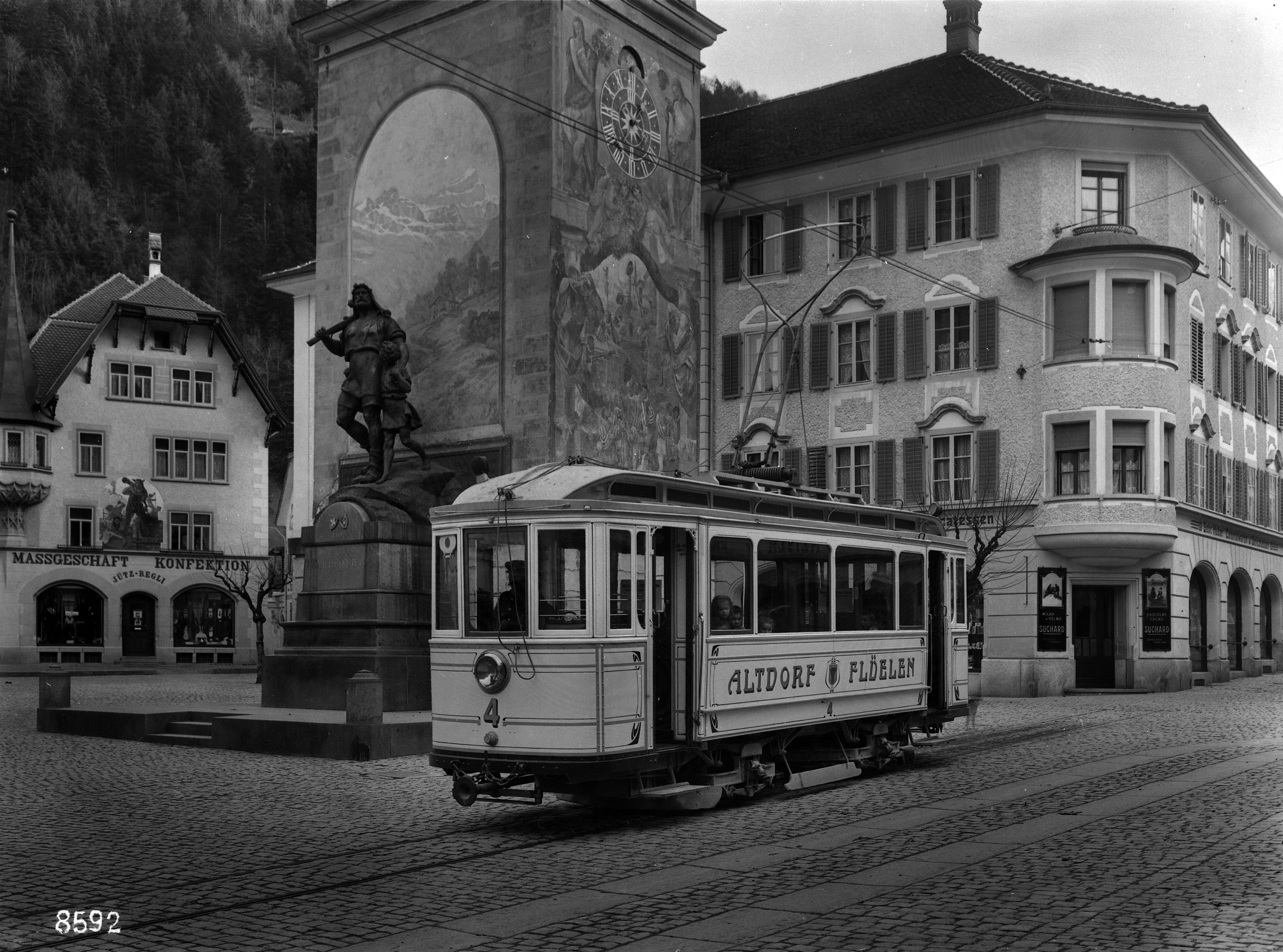
- Tram in ca. 1906

Overview
- Status: Closed and removed
- Locale: Canton of Uri, Switzerland
- Termini: Altdorf (Telldenkmal); Flüelen (railway station)
- Stations: 7

Service
- Services: 1

History
- Opened: 1906
- Closed: 1951

Technical
- Line length: 3.1 kilometres (1.9 mi)
- Track gauge: Metre (3 ft 3 3/8 in)
- Minimum radius: 25 metres (82 ft)
- Electrification: 600 V, DC, overhead
- Maximum incline: 3.1%

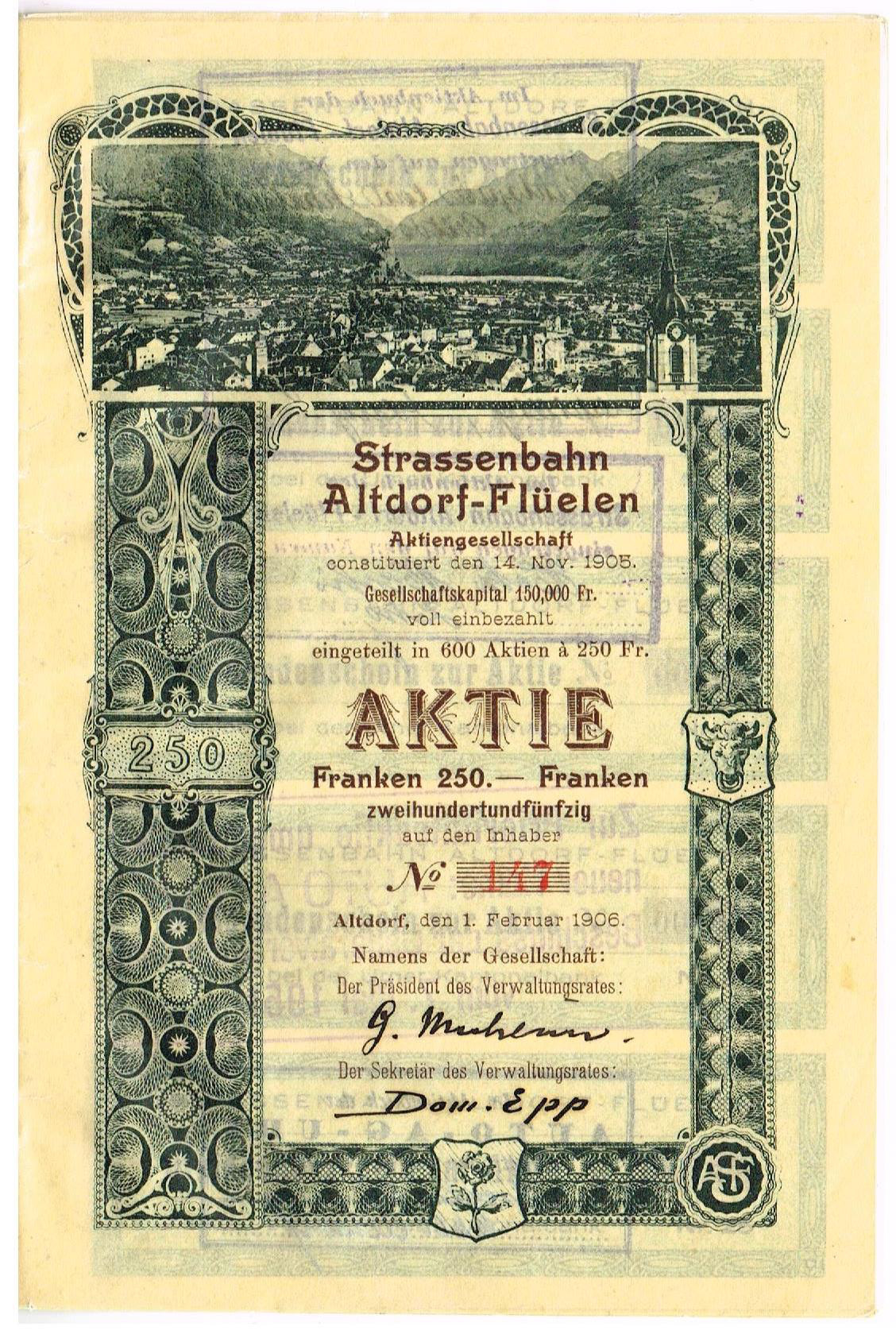
Share of the Strassenbahn Altdorf-Flüelen AG, issued 1. February 1906

The Altdorf–Flüelen tramway (German: Strassenbahn Altdorf–Flüelen, AF) was a metre gauge electric tramway in the Swiss canton of Uri. It linked the town of Altdorf with Flüelen, terminating adjacent to Flüelen station on the Gotthard railway.

The tramway was opened in 1906, and closed in 1951, being replaced by a bus service. The line was electrified at 600 V DC. It had a length of 3.1 kilometres (1.9 mi), with 7 stops, a maximum gradient of 3.1% and a minimum radius of 25 metres (82 ft).

The only visible remains of line is the tram depot, on the outskirts of Altdorf. After closure of the tramway, this was used as a bus depot by the Auto AG Uri until they moved to new premises in 2009.
