= Fredi Lerch =

Swiss social critic journalist and publicist

Alfred “Fredi” Lerch (born 10 April 1954 in Roggwil) is a Swiss social critic journalist and publicist.

== Biography ==
From 1982 to 2001, Lerch was editor of the Swiss weekly newspaper Die Wochenzeitung (WOZ). At that time he published a “two-volume history of Bernese subculture between 1955 and 1970 under the title of Begerts letzte Lektion (1996) and Muellers Weg ins Paradies (2001)”. From 2001 to 2006, he was a member of the Municipal “Literary Commission” (Literarische Kommission) of the City of Bern. Since 2002 he works as a freelance journalist and is member of a press office called “puncto” in Bern. From 2006 to 2008, he published, together with Erwin Marti, the collected works (Werkausgabe) of the Swiss writer Carl Albert Loosli. He is the founder of the nonconformism archive at the Swiss National Library.
