= Johann Daniel Osterrieth =

French-Swiss architect (1768–1839)

- Born: 9 October 1768; Strasbourg, Kingdom of France
- Died: 25 July 1839 (aged 70); Bern, Switzerland
- Occupation: Architect
- Spouse: Marie Uffelmann (m. 1803)
- Children: Ludwig Friedrich Osterrieth

Johann Daniel Osterrieth (9 October 1768 – 25 July 1839) was an architect of Neoclassicism, born in Strasbourg, who worked in Bern from 1798. He built the Meyer-Feer House in Aarau and, as master builder of the canton of Bern, mainly parsonages and churches. In the city of Bern he redesigned the northwestern city entrance and the penitentiaries.

== Biography ==
Johann Daniel Osterrieth was born on 9 October 1768 in Strasbourg. He was French, and in 1821 he became a citizen of Bern. In 1803 he married Marie Uffelmann.

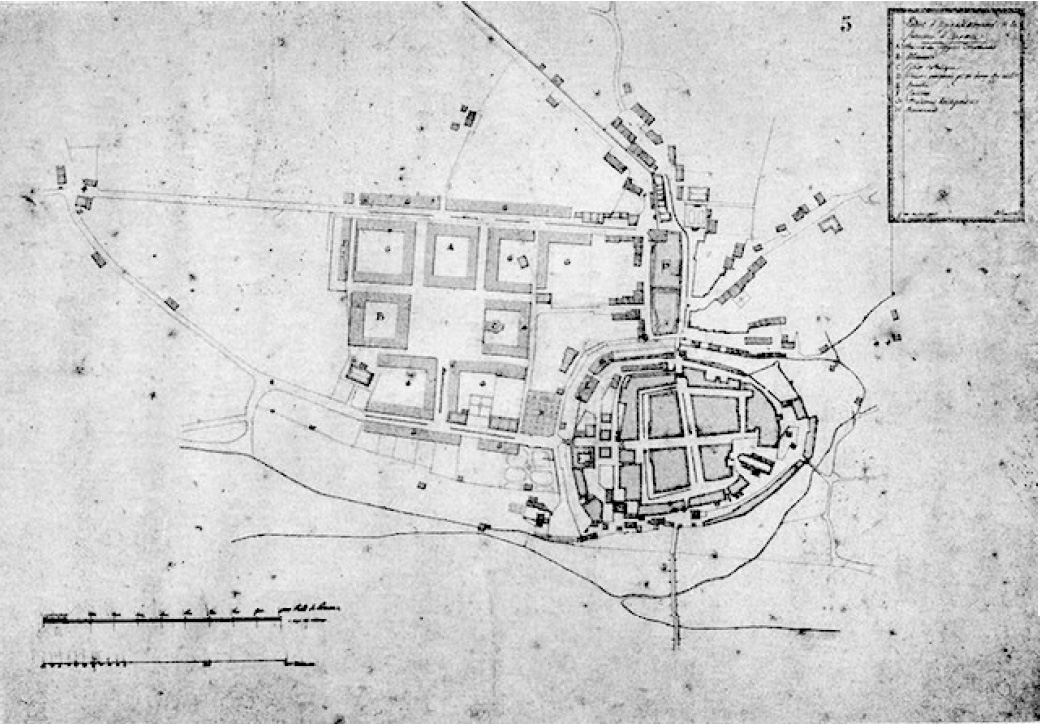
Osterrieth's 1798 extension plan for Aarau (Plan d'agrandissement de la commune d'Aarau)

Before he moved to Bern, Osterrieth had built the Meyer-Feer House in Aarau (1794–1797), and in 1798 he presented the Projet d'Agrandissement (extension project) for the future capital of the Helvetic Republic. In 1798 he moved to Bern and took over the site management (Bauleitung) of the mint designed by Jacques Denis Antoine.

In 1801 Osterrieth began his long service for the canton of Bern. From 1803, as master builder (Baumeister), he built mainly parsonages, such as those of Hindelbank and Aarwangen, and churches, such as those of Limpach and Grosshöchstetten. In the city of Bern he redesigned, among other things, the northwestern city entrance with two guardhouses and the penitentiaries (1824–1836).

With his work, marked by sober, monumental forms, Osterrieth was an outstanding architect of Neoclassicism in the first half of the 19th century. He died in Bern on 25 July 1839.

His son Ludwig Friedrich Osterrieth (1807–1888) was also an architect. He designed the Morillon estate (Morillongut, 1830–1833) in Wabern, in the municipality of Köniz, which had previously been attributed to his father.

== Bibliography ==
- Architektenlexikon der Schweiz 19./20. Jahrhundert, 1998, 407–408
