= Gustav Mossdorf =

German architect (1831–1907)

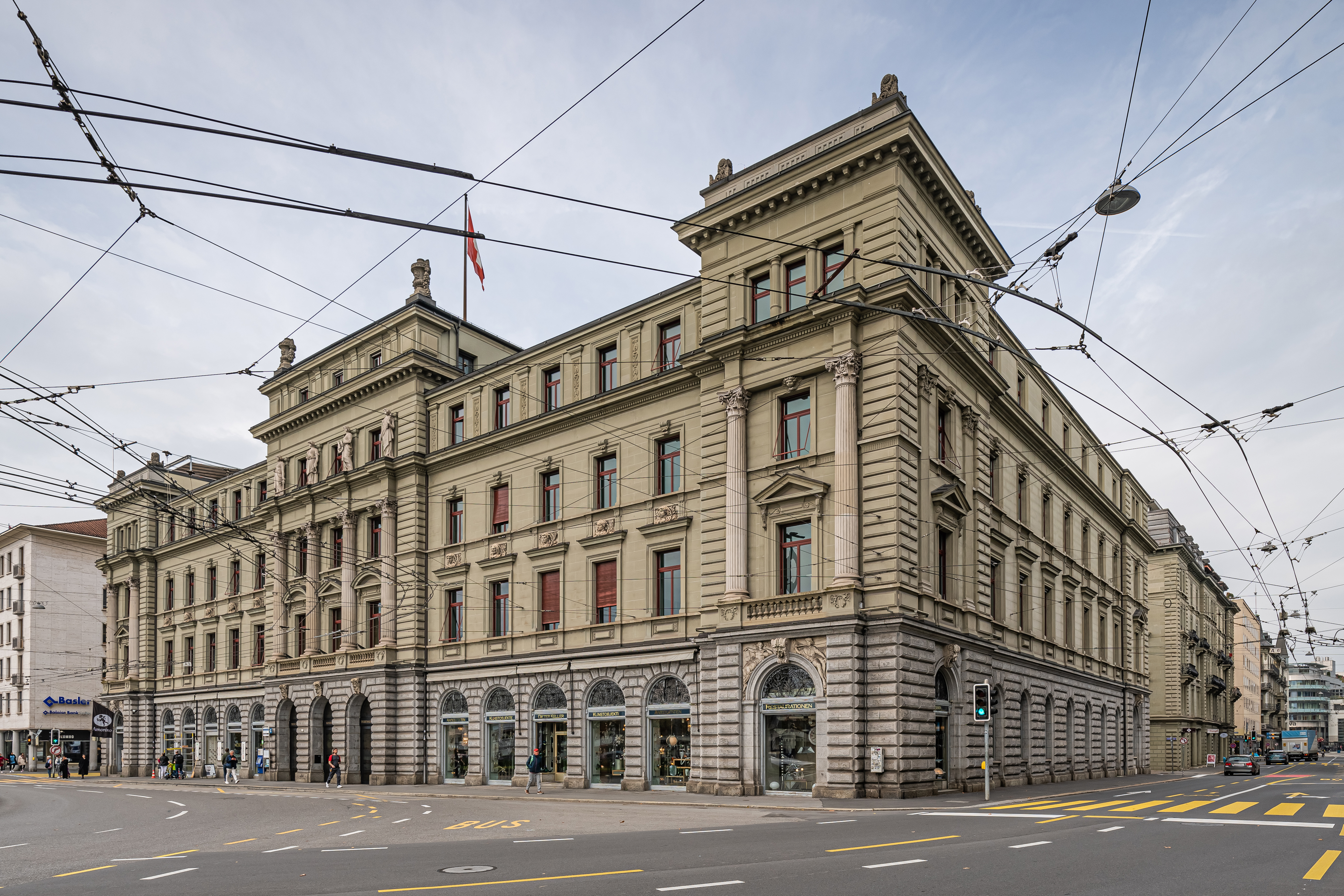
- The former administrative building of the Gotthard Railway in Lucerne (1886–1888)
- Born: 29 June 1831; Altenburg, Saxe-Altenburg
- Died: 6 February 1907 (aged 75); Lucerne, Switzerland
- Education: Academy of Fine Arts, Munich
- Occupation: Architect
- Buildings: Administrative building of the Gotthard Railway, Lucerne

Gustav Mossdorf (29 June 1831 – 6 February 1907) was a German architect who worked in Lucerne. As head of the building construction department of the Gotthard Railway from 1875 to 1890, he designed numerous station buildings. His main work was the railway's administrative building in Lucerne, built in 1886–1888.

== Biography ==
Gustav Mossdorf was born on 29 June 1831 in Altenburg in Thuringia. He served an apprenticeship as a mason and attended the craftsmen's school (Handwerkerschule) in Altenburg. From 1849 to 1853 he studied at the Academy of Fine Arts in Munich and at the building school (Bauschule) in Dresden. A traineeship on the construction of the railway line from Tharandt to Freiberg in Saxony was followed by a study trip to Italy.

In 1855 Mossdorf was a lecturer at the teachers' seminary in Rathausen, and from 1856 to 1873 he was professor of technical drawing at the higher educational institution (Höhere Lehranstalt) in Lucerne.

As head of the building construction department (Hochbauabteilung) of the Gotthard Railway from 1875 to 1890, Mossdorf designed numerous station facilities and station buildings, among them the stations between Flüelen and Faido and the station of Chiasso. His main work was the administrative building of the Gotthard Railway on the Schweizerhofquai in Lucerne, built in 1886–1888, which later housed the Federal Insurance Court. He died in Lucerne on 6 February 1907.

== Bibliography ==
- W. Stutz, Bahnhöfe der Schweiz, 1976
- Architektenlexikon der Schweiz 19./20. Jahrhundert, 1998, 391
