= Béatrice Métraux =

French-Swiss politician and lawyer

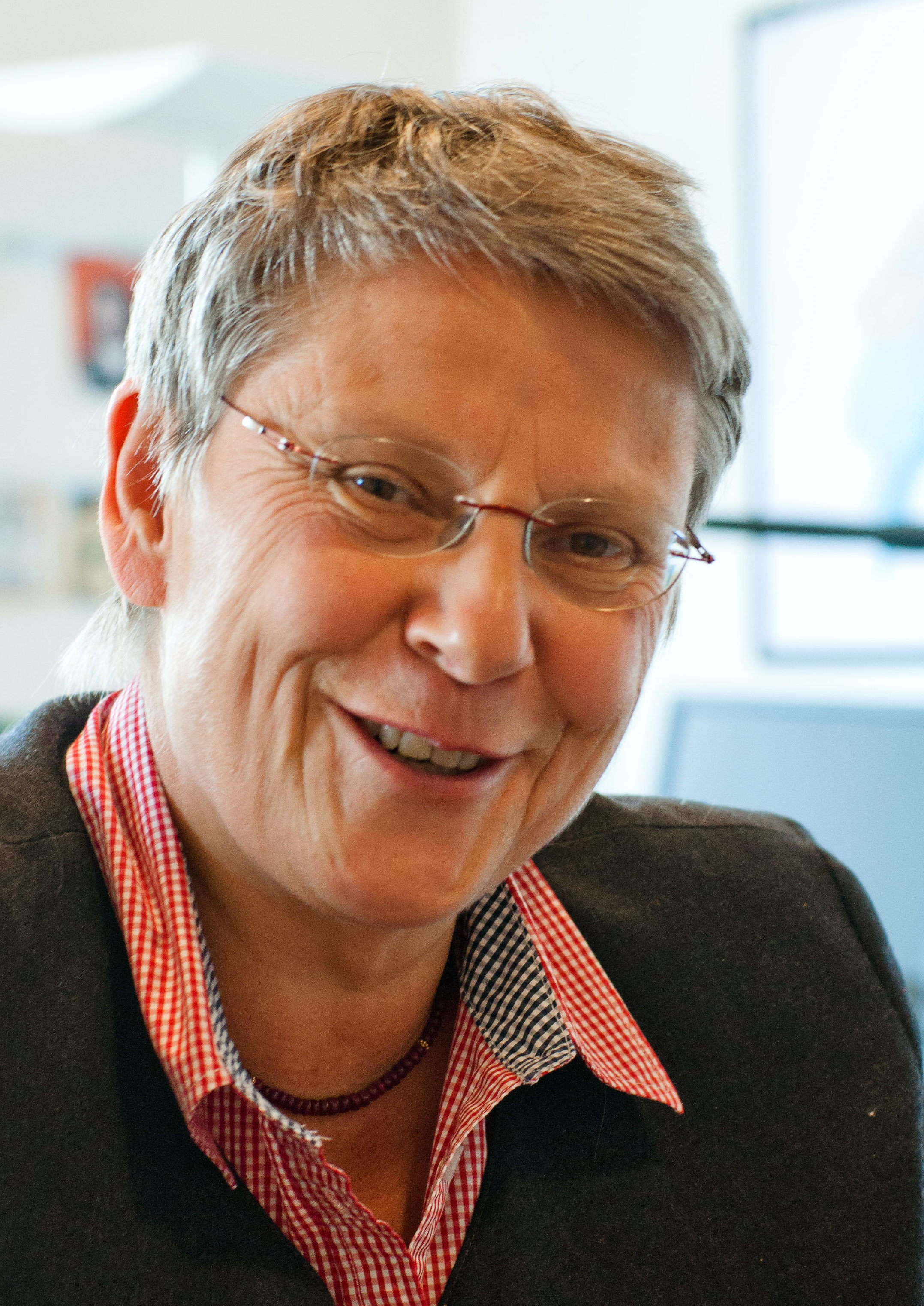
- Méatraux in 2012.

Council of State of Vaud
- In office 10 January 2012 – 30 June 2022
- Preceded by: Jean-Claude Mermond
- Succeeded by: Vassilis Venizelos

Personal details
- Born: August 11, 1955 (age 70) Arcachon, Nouvelle-Aquitaine, France
- Citizenship: Switzerland; France
- Party: Green Party of Switzerland
- Education: University of Lille; University of Geneva; University of Lausanne
- Occupation: Lawyer

Béatrice Métraux (born 11 August 1955 in Arcachon, Nouvelle-Aquitaine) is a French-Swiss politician and lawyer. She is a member of the Green Party of Switzerland, and was part of the Council of State of Vaud from 2012 to 2022.

== Biography ==
Béatrix Métraux was born on 11 August 1955 in Arcachon, France; however, she spent the first 25 years of her life in Northern France. Métraux has an education background in the field of law, particularly though her Master's degree in Public law at the University of Lille, then her later studies of public law and European studies at the University of Lausanne and the University of Geneva, respectively.

In 1981, she moved to Switzerland, and began working at the Lausanne District Tribunal. On the same year, she became a contributor to the Federal Office for Refugees at the Swiss Institute of Comparative Law. Prior to this a year earlier, and until 1990, she was a private lawyer for the Swiss Agency for Development and Cooperation in Rwanda and Mali.
