= Gefängnis Zürich =

Prison in Zürich, Switzerland

Coordinates: 47.374732°N 8.526542°E

The Gefängnis Zürich (Zürich Prison) is a prison in the city of Zürich, Switzerland, located at the Rotwandstrasse.

== History ==
The Gefängnis Zürich opened in 1916, and has been extended several times, most recently in 1991 with the establishment of a provisional facility with 34 beds in one of two courtyards. It is the largest district jail of the Canton of Zürich, and has a capacity of 170 prisoners (including an 18-bed ward for female prisoners) and 48 employees (as of 2009). Its director is Markus Epple. It is located in the immediate vicinity of 5 general and 2 specialized district attorney offices. Most of the prisoners are remandees, with only a few convicts serving sentences there.

== Notable prisoners ==
Vitaly Kaloyev was incarcerated in 2005 on charges of killing an air traffic controller, Peter Nielsen, whom he blamed for the death of his wife and two children in a mid-air collision over Überlingen in 2002. Kaloyev was finally released and returned to his homeland of North Ossetia–Alania in 2007 after serving two years in a sentence.

The prison was the site of incarceration for Mohamed Achraf, a suspect in Spanish investigations into a failed bomb attack on Spain's National Court. Achraf was imprisoned in 2004 and spent some of his time within the prison in solitary confinement due to his status as a suspected terrorist.

Roman Polanski has been incarcerated in 2009, according to several news media, pending his extradition hearing.

== Controversy and deaths in custody ==
In 2008, a 17-year-old Swiss prisoner in remand on suspicion of driving offences, property offences and violent crimes strangled himself in his prison cell with scraps of cloth.
