= Schellenwerk =

Public forced labor punishment in 16th-18th century Switzerland

Schellenwerk (also Schallenwerk) was a form of public forced labor punishment commonly used in the German-speaking regions of Switzerland from the 16th to 18th centuries, particularly in Bern, Basel, Zurich, and Lucerne. In the French-speaking subject territories of Bern and in Fribourg, these punishments were known as selnaux, sonnaux, or sonnettes. The term refers to the bells that were attached to the usually shackled convicted individuals who were required to fulfill their work obligations.

== Description ==
The term Schellenwerk derives from the bells (Schellen) attached to the convicted individuals, who were typically fettered and required to perform mandatory labor as part of their penal execution in prisons. The pillories and other instruments of infamy were also fitted with bells. This punishment was imposed for legal infractions that did not warrant corporal punishment, especially begging associated with marginal groups. From the 17th century onward, it was also applied to more serious offenses where special mitigating circumstances permitted the imposition of a poena extraordinaria under criminal law.

Convicts were generally assigned to perform publicly beneficial tasks for the authorities, such as road construction, fortress building, and the cleaning of streets and public squares. The intent was to foster moral improvement in the offenders through rigorous labor, thereby contributing value to the state.

Although Schellenwerk carried the nature of a public honor punishment, it did not render the individual dishonorable, as it avoided the stigmatizing association with the executioner. Nevertheless, its impacts on the physical integrity and health of those subjected to it often equated to those of a corporal sanction.

== Bibliography ==
- Fumasoli, Georg: Ursprünge und Anfänge der Schellenwerke. Ein Beitrag zur Frühgeschichte des Zuchthauswesens, 1981.
- Anselmier, Henri: Les prisons vaudoises (1798-1871), 1983.
- Anselmier, Henri: Les prisons vaudoises (1872-1942), 1993.
- Krause, Thomas: Geschichte des Strafvollzugs. Von den Kerkern des Altertums bis zur Gegenwart, 1999.
