= Justizvollzugsanstalt Realta =

Correctional institution in Grisons, Switzerland

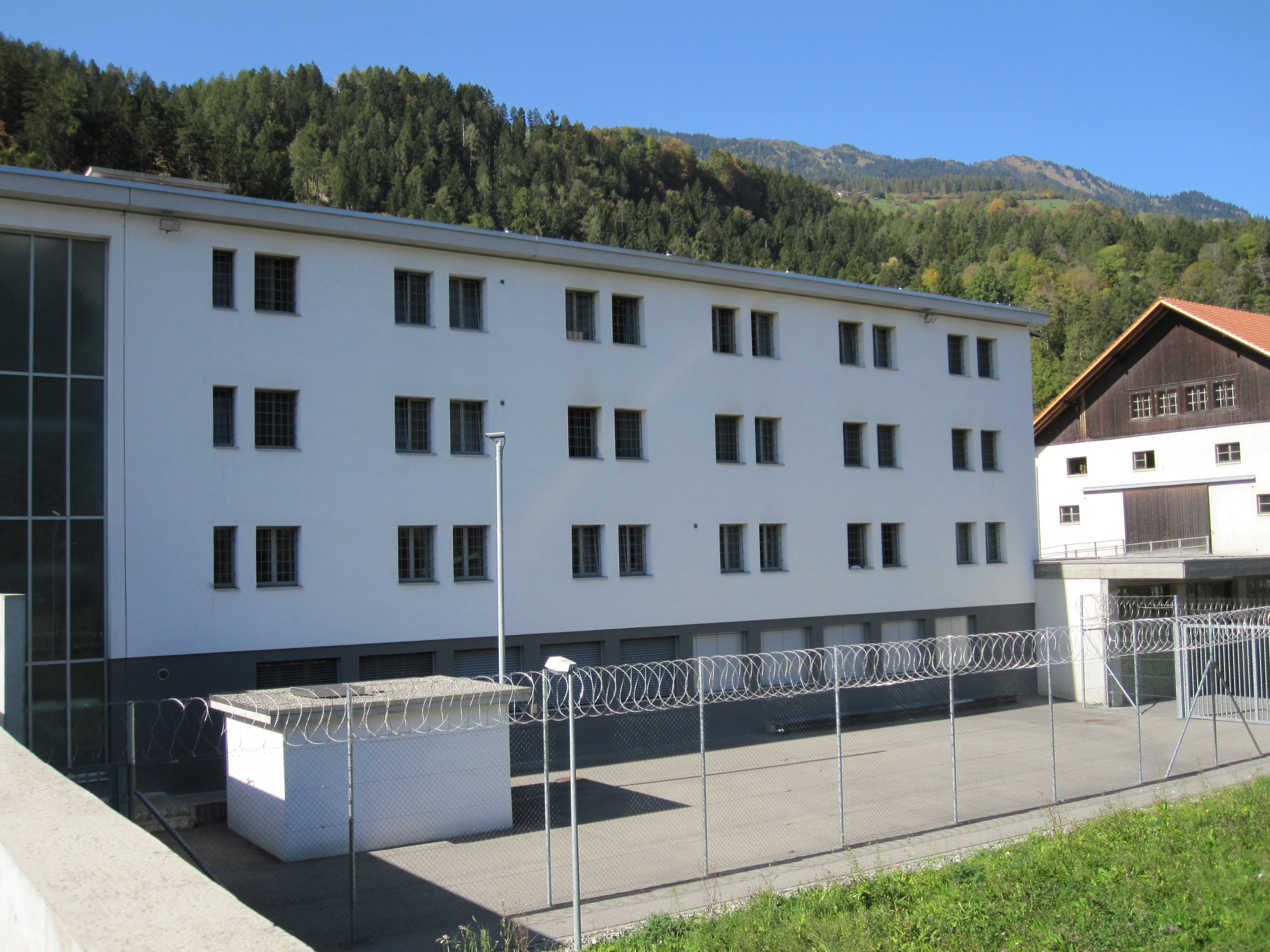
- Interactive map of the Justizvollzugsanstalt Realta area
- Former names: Korrektionsanstalt Realta (1855) Korrektions- und Irrenverwahrungsanstalt Realta; Arbeitserziehungsanstalt Realta (1941) Verwahrungsanstalt Realta (1965)

General information
- Type: Correctional facility
- Location: Cazis, Domleschg, Grisons, Switzerland
- Coordinates: 46.7338°N 9.4262°E
- Opened: 1965 (current form); 1855 (original form)
- Owner: Canton of Grisons

Other information
- Seating capacity: 118 inmates

Justizvollzugsanstalt Realta is a correctional facility located in Cazis, Domleschg, Canton of Grisons, Switzerland. It houses adult male inmates and has a capacity of 118 correctional places.

The institution has its origins in a forced labor establishment created in 1840 at Fürstenau, which was relocated to Realta in 1855. For over a century, the complex operated as a multi-functional institution that combined correctional, psychiatric, and social welfare functions, housing not only criminal offenders but also individuals subject to administrative detention, people with mental illness, and various marginalized populations. The modern correctional facility emerged in 1991 when the prison and psychiatric functions were institutionally separated, with the latter continuing as the independent Klinik Beverin.

== Current operations ==
Justizvollzugsanstalt Realta operates as part of the Eastern Switzerland Penal Execution Concordat (Ostschweizerisches Strafvollzugskonkordat), established in 1956, which allows for the coordinated management of correctional services across multiple Swiss cantons. The facility exclusively houses adult male offenders and provides 118 correctional places for individuals sentenced to imprisonment and criminal detention from the participating cantons.

== History ==
=== Early institutional history (1840-1855) ===
The origins of the Realta correctional complex trace back to 1840, when a forced labor establishment was created in the former episcopal castle of Fürstenau. This facility was among the first cantonal institutions of its kind in Switzerland, designed to accommodate approximately fifty men and women deemed "depraved" or "lazy" as part of a repressive policy toward the poor. The institution aimed to "educate" these individuals through forced labor, reflecting 19th-century attitudes toward poverty and social assistance.

Inmates at Fürstenau were utilized as cheap labor for the Rhine correction project, a major hydraulic engineering undertaking that helped connect the Domleschg region to broader transportation and economic networks by the end of the 19th century. The facility also housed various marginalized individuals who could not find their place in society. In 1843, a special section for "incurable madmen" was established, marking the beginning of the institution's psychiatric functions.

=== Establishment at Realta (1855-1919) ===
In 1855, the Canton of Grisons relocated the institution from Fürstenau to a newly constructed facility at Realta, where a larger agricultural area could be exploited for forced labor. It was initially called the Korrektionsanstalt Realta (Realta correctional house), and also known as the Korrektions- und Irrenverwahrungsanstalt Realta (Realta correctional and lunatic asylum). The facility maintained a capacity of approximately fifty individuals and continued the dual function of housing both criminal offenders and individuals with mental illness.

=== Expansion and psychiatric integration (1919-1965) ===
The complex underwent significant expansion during the early 20th century. In 1919, the canton constructed the Asyl Realta within the institution's perimeter, adding approximately 250 additional places primarily intended for people with mental illness. This psychiatric facility was subsequently renamed several times: Heil- und Pflegeanstalt Beverin (Beverin healing and care institution) in 1951, Psychiatrische Klinik Beverin (Beverin psychiatric clinic) in 1967, and finally Klinik Beverin in 2002.

During the 1920s, the institution also incorporated the Rothenbrunnen asylum, a former thermal spa station located several kilometers away that housed elderly people and, until the mid-1930s, children. In 1941, the main facility was renamed Arbeitserziehungsanstalt Realta (Realta work education institution), reflecting evolving approaches to correctional treatment.

=== Population ===
Throughout much of the 20th century, before the institutional separation, Realta housed a diverse population that included individuals with mental illness, those subject to administrative detention (also called "correctionals"), people with disabilities (termed "invalids"), individuals with alcoholism ("drinkers"), and "colonist-workers" who were mostly volunteers subject to less strict regimes. The boundaries between punishment, treatment, and rehabilitation remained blurred for much of the institution's history, with many inmates deprived of their personal freedom under sometimes inhumane conditions.

The women's section of the forced labor facility, which had always represented a minority of detainees (approximately one quarter), was closed in 1949, after which the facility focused exclusively on male inmates.

=== Modern correctional facility (1965-present) ===
The institution's transformation into its current form began with the inauguration of the Verwahrungsanstalt Realta (Realta detention center) in 1965, following the construction of two new cell blocks in the early 1960s to replace the old housing. The facility was renamed "Justizvollzugsanstalt Realta" in 2007, reflecting modern correctional terminology and practices.

Under the Eastern Switzerland Penal Execution Concordat established in 1956, the facility began housing individuals from multiple cantons who had been sentenced to short prison terms and criminal detention, while continuing to accommodate people subject to administrative detention. Until the abolition of administrative internment in 1981, an estimated 1,000 to 1,500 people from Grisons and other cantons were administratively placed at Realta.

=== Institutional separation ===
In 1991, the Realta correctional institution and the Beverin psychiatric clinic were institutionally separated. However, the historical connection between coercive care measures, psychiatry, and penal execution was not entirely severed, as forensic psychiatry became a specialty of Klinik Beverin.

== Archaeological discoveries ==
When the closed penitentiary of Cazis Tignez was constructed in 2019 near the Justizvollzugsanstalt Realta to replace the Sennhof prison that had existed in Chur since 1817, archaeological excavations uncovered the cemetery of the former Realta correctional house, which had been used until 1910. Analysis of more than one hundred skeletons revealed a particularly high number of fractured ribs, providing evidence of the general climate of violence that characterized daily life at the historical institution. This paleopathological evidence offered concrete proof of the harsh conditions endured by inmates during the 19th and early 20th centuries.

A commemorative plaque was erected in 2022 next to the former cemetery site to acknowledge the suffering of those who died at the institution.

== Official acknowledgment ==
In 2017, the Grand Council of Grisons presented official apologies to victims of coercive care measures and out-of-home placements, many of whom had been interned in the historical Realta complex. This acknowledgment was part of Switzerland's broader reckoning with its history of administrative detention and coercive care practices that affected thousands of individuals throughout the 19th and 20th centuries.

== Bibliography ==
- Schrofer, Christian: Bündner Psychiatriegeschichte des 19. Jahrhunderts, 1999.
- Bietenhader, Sabine: "Schule der Ordnung, der Reinlichkeit, des Gehorsams und der Arbeitsamkeit" – Die Zwangsarbeitsanstalt Fürstenau, 1840-1855", in: Jahrbuch Historische Gesellschaft Graubünden, 145, 2015, pp. 75–140.
- Rietmann, Tanja: Fürsorgerische Zwangsmassnahmen. Anstaltsversorgungen, Fremdplatzierungen und Entmündigungen in Graubünden im 19. und 20. Jahrhundert, 2017.
- Cooper, Christine; Heinzle, Bernd; Reitmaier, Thomas: "Evidence of infectious disease, trauma, disability and deficiency in skeletons from the 19th/20th century correctional facility and asylum "Realta" in Cazis, Switzerland", in: PLOS ONE, 14/5, 2019.
- Gusset, Silas; Seglias, Loretta; Lengwiler, Martin: Versorgen, behandeln, pflegen. Geschichte der Psychiatrie in Graubünden, 2021.
