= Justizvollzugsanstalt Witzwil =

Men's prison in Switzerland

Coordinates: 46°59′16″N 7°3′33″E

The Justizvollzugsanstalt Witzwil (Prison Witzwil) is a men's prison in the canton of Bern, Switzerland. It consists of a closed part and a number of minimum security habitation units. The prisoners work on the institution's huge farm estate on the territories of the municipalities Erlach, Gampelen and Ins in the canton of Bern and Haut-Vully in the canton of Fribourg. Former prisoners who are yet to find employment are also allowed to work on these farms.

The main seat and official address are located in the community of Gampelen.

== History ==
The Witzwil prison was a brainchild of Otto Kellerhals, who also served as the institution's first director in 1895. His son Hans Kellerhals took over after his retirement.

The farms of the prison are on what was formerly a part of the huge marshlands called Grand Marais. It was realized that the land parcels could be reclaimed for agriculture through the Jura water correction. In 1860 Public Notary Witz from Erlach bought the whole land, which henceforth took up his name. In 1870 he sold it to the newly founded Landwirtschaftlichen Gesellschaft Witzwil (also called Einfache Gesellschaft Grosses Moos), to which the politician Jakob Stämpfli was involved with all his fortune. The company, however, fell 1879 in bankruptcy, and 1891 the domain was acquired by the canton of Bern from the bankruptcy estate.

In 1894 the first Barracks were built for 100 inmates. Friedrich Glauser spent one year as an "administrative inmate" in Witzwil 1925 to 1926 and tried to commit suicide. Shortly after the end of the World War II Witzwil attained its maximum capacity with 600 prisoners. Between 1980 and 1985 a new prison building was built. 1995 a closed “Wohngruppe” was opened. 1998 followed the opening of the department “Ausschaffung” for 36 people bound to be forcefully repatriated back to their country of origin.

=== Current ===
Today, Witzwil offers space for 200 inmates and employs 118 employees. Out of this number of prisoners, the institution posts an average of 50 escapes per year. This low figure - considering the lack of security and containment mechanisms - is partly attributed to the short sentences of the inmates as well as the internal security in Switzerland, which serves as a deterrent.

Beginning in the 1990s, the government also constructed an annex at Witzwil, which currently serves as expulsion prison, or a detainment facility for individuals waiting to be deported, pending a court ruling or police decree.

With a total agricultural land area of 612 hectares, the prison has the largest farm in Switzerland, with an annual revenue of 17 million Swiss francs. The operation includes 20 tractors, 500 cattle, 120 horses, 600 pigs and 100 chicken.

== See also ==
- List of prisons in Switzerland
