= Bellechasse Prison =

Prison complex in Fribourg, Switzerland

Coordinates: 46°58′28″N 7°08′12″E

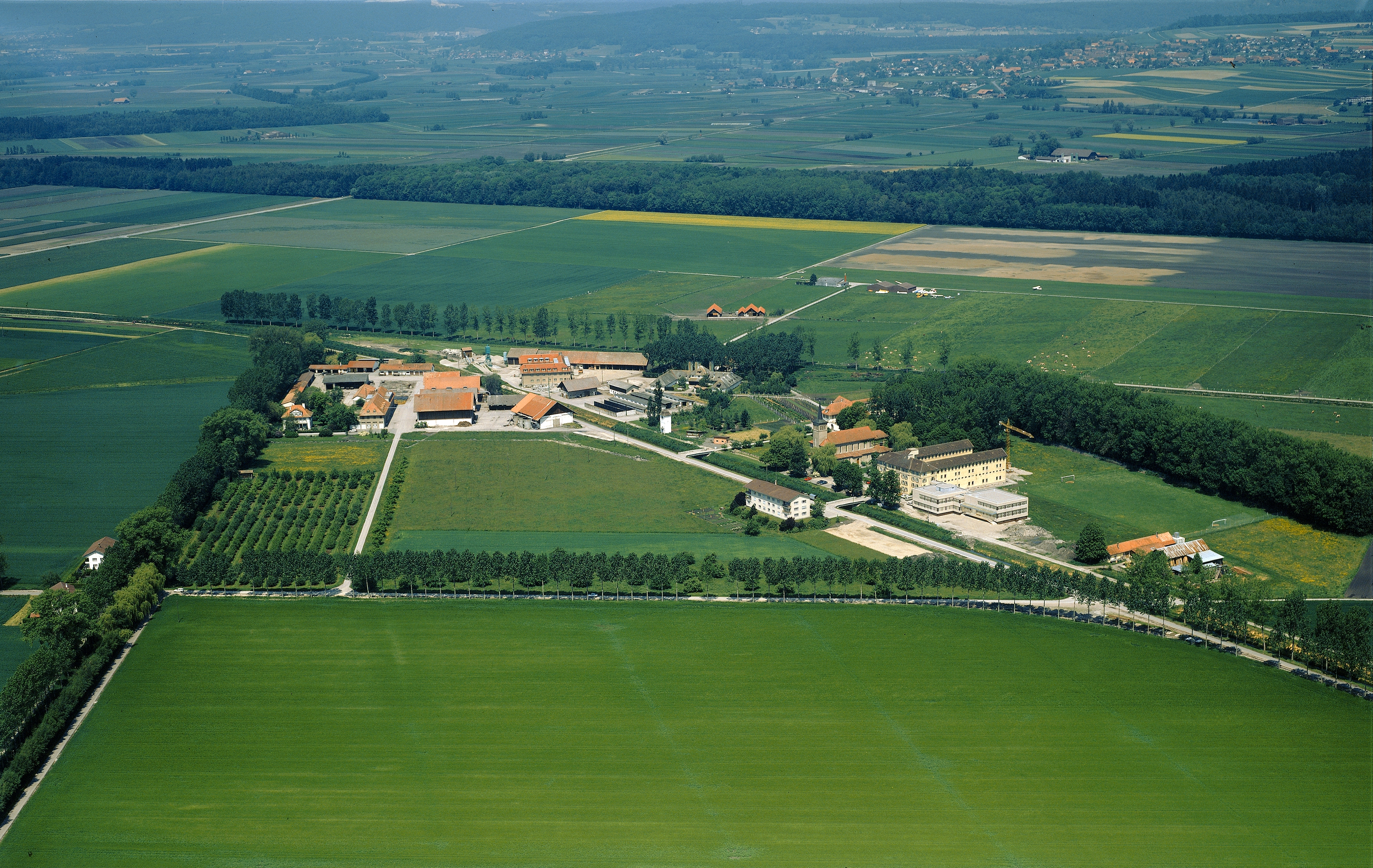
- Bellechasse Prison in 1987
- Interactive map of Bellechasse Prison
- Location: Sugiez, Canton of Fribourg, Switzerland
- Status: Operational
- Security class: Open and semi-open prison
- Capacity: 203
- Population: 140 (+7 external)
- Opened: 1898
- Managed by: Canton of Fribourg

The Bellechasse Prison (EPB) is a Swiss penitentiary complex located in Sugiez, spanning the municipalities of Mont-Vully and Galmiz in the Canton of Fribourg. Inmates serving sentences are placed in an open or semi-open regime and contribute to the operation of the associated farm.

== Overview ==
The Bellechasse Prison is a group of penitentiary facilities located in Sugiez, Fribourg. It houses inmates serving prison sentences.

Modeled after the Witzwil Prison, Bellechasse operates as an open and semi-open facility with a farm. Security measures are minimal, and inmates perform agricultural tasks to sustain the operation. Additional workshops support maintenance and tool production for agricultural activities. The farm enables the prison to be nearly self-sufficient in food production, except for specific items like rice or oil.

In 1966, Bellechasse had a capacity of 340 inmates (300 men and 40 women). Since 2010, the capacity has been increased to 203 inmates.

Inmates are distributed across various sections of the facility:

- The cellular building with 100 places
- The “Le Pavillon” building (40 places)
- Sections for early sentence execution (40 places)
- The “La Sapinière” building for inmates with drug addiction (20 places)

The facility also includes an infirmary and disciplinary units.

In 2012, Bellechasse employed 130 staff members, including 80 guards. Unlike in many other prisons, the open-regime concept means guards also serve as professionals in the trades practiced on-site.

In 2018, the cost of detention in the open sector was estimated at 330 Swiss francs per day per inmate.

Religion and spirituality are integral to the inmates’ experience at Bellechasse. The prison administration facilitates religious practice while ensuring it does not lead to communautarist or particularist demands.

In 2002, approximately 43% of inmates were Catholics, 32% Muslims, and 14% Reformed. With the increasing number of Muslim inmates, the prison staff has been encouraged to adopt an open approach toward Islam.

== Agricultural operation ==
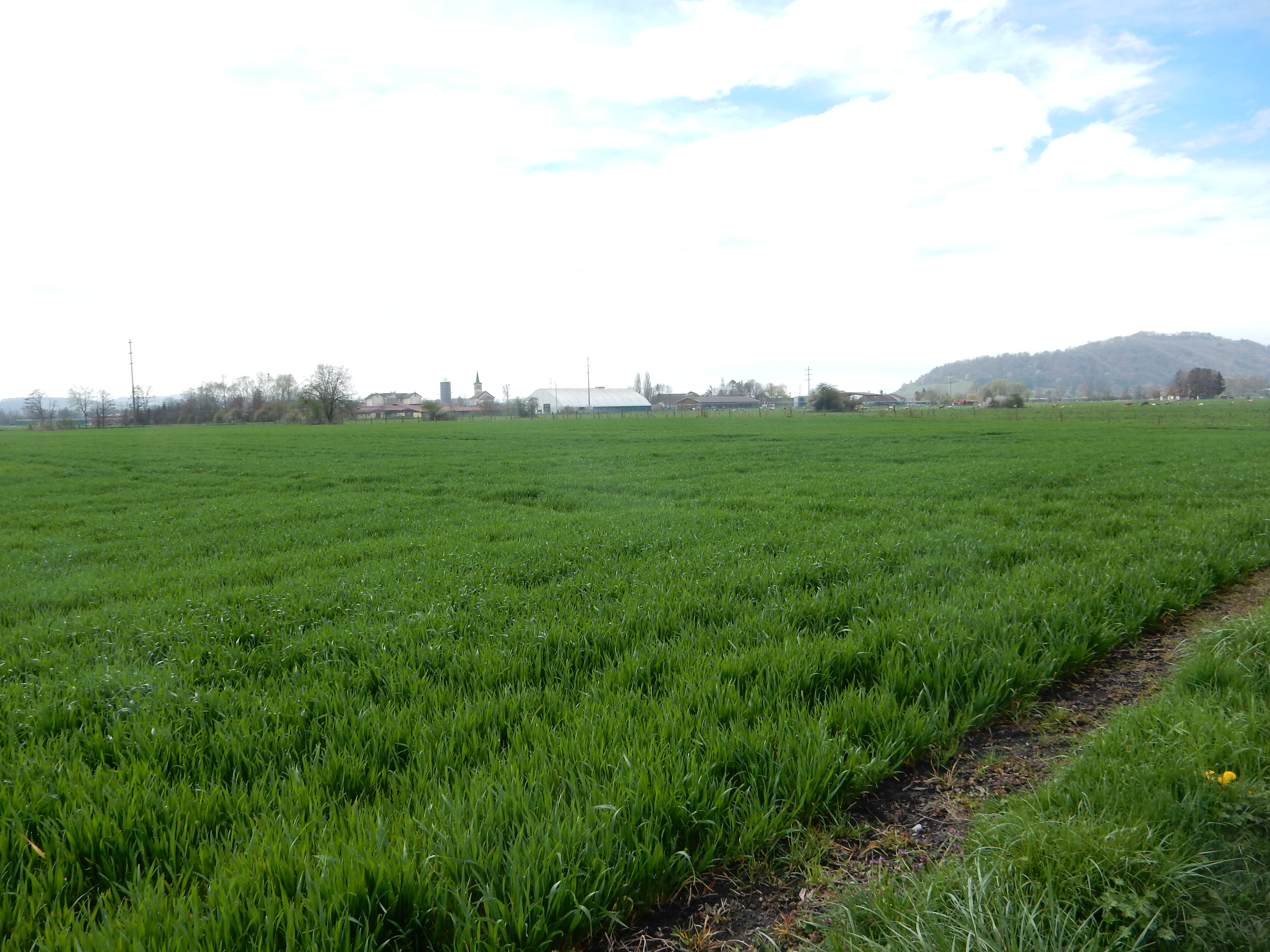
Bellechasse, with Mont Vully to the right (2024)

The Bellechasse Prison includes a 700-hectare agricultural operation. It is the second-largest agricultural operation in Switzerland, following the penitentiary farm at Witzwil in the Canton of Bern. As one of the largest in the country, the farm also hosts training programs for farmers.

The agricultural activities primarily involve cereal crops, vegetable farming, fruit cultivation, and livestock farming (cattle, sheep, pigs, and poultry). Of the 700 hectares, approximately 365 are used for agricultural purposes, with about 100 dedicated to cereal crops and 17 to vegetable farming. The site also houses horses and beehives.

While agriculture is the primary activity, the prison operates additional workshops to support it. Inmates perform tasks such as repairs, carpentry, and painting.

Various agricultural-related projects have been implemented. Since the 2010s, a woodchip heating system and a biogas plant powered by manure and organic waste from the farm have been operational.

A shop selling artisanal and agricultural products to the public operates on-site. In 2015, an online store was launched. The initiative aims to highlight the prison’s rehabilitation efforts and promote the inmates’ work.

The agricultural operation employs around 40 inmates and 20 professionals and guards. Other inmates work in various workshops. Working hours are from 7:35 AM to 5:00 PM (with wake-up at 6:30 AM and dinner at 6:00 PM), including a midday break for meals.

At Bellechasse, inmates earn a daily wage of 25 Swiss francs, and work is mandatory. These earnings, which may be reduced for disciplinary reasons, allow inmates to improve their living conditions (e.g., renting a television), save for release, and cover legal fees, such as victim compensation.

Beyond financial contributions to the prison’s budget, the open-regime and agricultural work yield positive results for inmate rehabilitation and reintegration, according to the administration. The director notes that inmates value working outdoors, enjoying limited daytime freedom. Interaction with animals, particularly horses, helps some manage anxiety and aggression. Selling products to the public enhances inmates’ self-esteem.

== History ==
=== Agricultural penal colony ===
In preparation for constructing a penitentiary, the Canton of Fribourg acquired the Bellechasse estate near Sugiez in 1895. The land, reclaimed from marshes following the Jura water correction, was initially undeveloped. In 1898, cantonal authorities established an agricultural penal colony, modeled after the Witzwil facility opened by the Canton of Bern. Initially equipped with a simple wooden housing structure, Bellechasse quickly grew in significance. Two dormitories and a chapel were built in 1900, and the colony soon housed 108 inmates.

=== Penitentiary institution ===
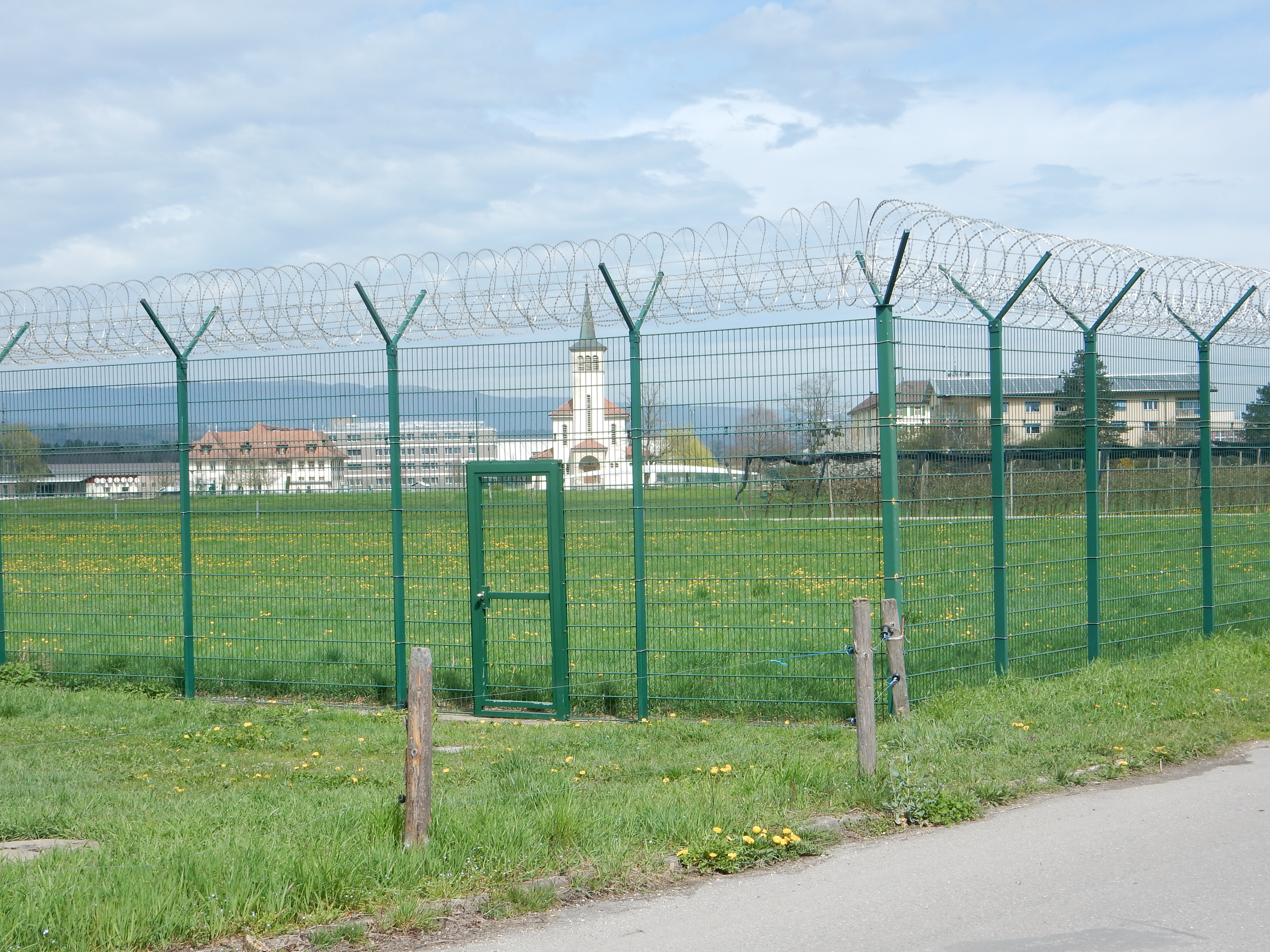
Bellechasse (2024)

In 1915, the Fribourg penitentiary system underwent significant reorganization. The house of correction and reformatory in Fribourg were closed, the Fribourg Central Prison was opened for pretrial detention, and sentenced inmates were transferred to Bellechasse. Subsequent construction provided necessary infrastructure. A women’s pavilion was built in 1916, a new cellular building for convicts, prisoners, and colonists in 1919, and the “La Sapinière” building for alcoholics in 1920. The state expanded the estate by 293 hectares in 1919, acquiring alpine pastures at Teysachaux. The facility cultivated vegetables and raised cattle. Given the importance of religion in the institution’s concept, a church replaced the chapel in 1933.

From 1933, internees were placed at Bellechasse, primarily in the former colony’s facilities. This practice ceased for minors in 1955 and for other internees in 1970. The cessation of administrative internments led to the closure of the former colony’s facilities. The women’s pavilion closed a year later.

From 1983 to the 2000s, the facility’s operations changed little. Renovations and modernization included the construction of “L’Annexe” in 1987 and the reorganization of “La Sapinière” for opioid-dependent inmates in 2000. In 2010, after two years of construction, a new 40-cell building for early sentence execution was opened to address prison overcrowding in the canton.

However, overcrowding reemerged by 2014. Security and medical challenges also arose, including insufficient separation between open and closed zones and a lack of facilities for inmates with psychological disorders. A construction and renovation project was presented to the Grand Council of Fribourg, with initial study funds approved in 2016.

Administratively, the Grand Council reorganized the penitentiary sector in 2016. In 2018, the Central Prison and Bellechasse were consolidated into a single structure. This consolidation trend, initiated in 2016 with plans for a pretrial detention unit at Bellechasse, accelerated. Following the escape of a dangerous inmate from the Central Prison in 2017, several Fribourg deputies called for its closure. Authorities proposed a unified penitentiary complex at Bellechasse, incorporating the 2016 plans. The project was presented in January 2020 and approved by the Grand Council in May 2020.

== Incidents ==
=== Security issues ===
In June 2014, an inmate was mistakenly released from Bellechasse. The individual was apprehended days later by Geneva police and reincarcerated.

In the same year, the Geneva Public Prosecutor’s Office opened an investigation into an inmate suspected of running a drug trafficking operation from his cell.

In 2017, an organized drug trade (involving cannabis, hashish, and small quantities of methadone, benzodiazepines, or cocaine) was uncovered at Bellechasse. Following the discovery of drugs during a general search, Fribourg police investigations led to 28 individuals facing justice.

In 2018, a trafficking operation involving mobile phones and doping products was dismantled. The responsible inmate exploited field work to smuggle items into the prison.

=== Escape ===
In May 2012, five inmates escaped from the facility. They fled their workshop with external assistance, which included cutting a nearby fence and providing a getaway car.

=== Deaths ===
On 16 November 2011, a 26-year-old Swiss inmate was found dead in his cell. The investigation revealed death by drug intoxication due to an excessive methadone prescription by a psychiatrist working at the facility. The court criticized the doctor’s lack of caution in dosing, noting that the prescribed amount exceeded norms and failed to account for drug interactions. The psychiatrist defended the prescription as a means to prevent the inmate from obtaining drugs through internal trafficking and noted that staff did not report changes in the inmate’s health. The doctor was sentenced to 240 day-fines of 120 Swiss francs for negligent homicide, as requested by the Public Prosecutor.

== Administrative internments ==
From the 1910s, the Swiss Confederation introduced legislation allowing administrative internments. These measures, resulting in deprivation of liberty, targeted lifestyles (e.g., poverty, rebellion, or non-conformity to social norms for women) rather than criminal acts. Historians note that alcoholism was a frequent cause of internment in Fribourg.

Abolished in 1981, administrative internment has been widely criticized. Lacking solid charges or legal classification, critics say decisions could be arbitrary in some cantons, with Fribourg’s prefects having sole authority. Additionally, internees could work for private companies, leading some facility directors to seek contracts for profitability, potentially resulting in abuses.

From the 1930s, Fribourg authorities used Bellechasse for administrative internments. Internees were subjected to the same conditions as convicted inmates, describing harsh and violent environments. Internees worked for companies like Micarna, Selecta, or Saia.

Internments at Bellechasse gradually ceased from the 1950s, with facilities dismantled. Internment of minors ended in 1955, followed by all internments in 1970.

== Notable prisoners ==
- Jean-Louis Jeanmaire
- Daniel Bloch and Jacques Fasel of the Fasel Gang
