= Cham Alpenblick railway station =

Swiss railway station

Cham Alpenblick
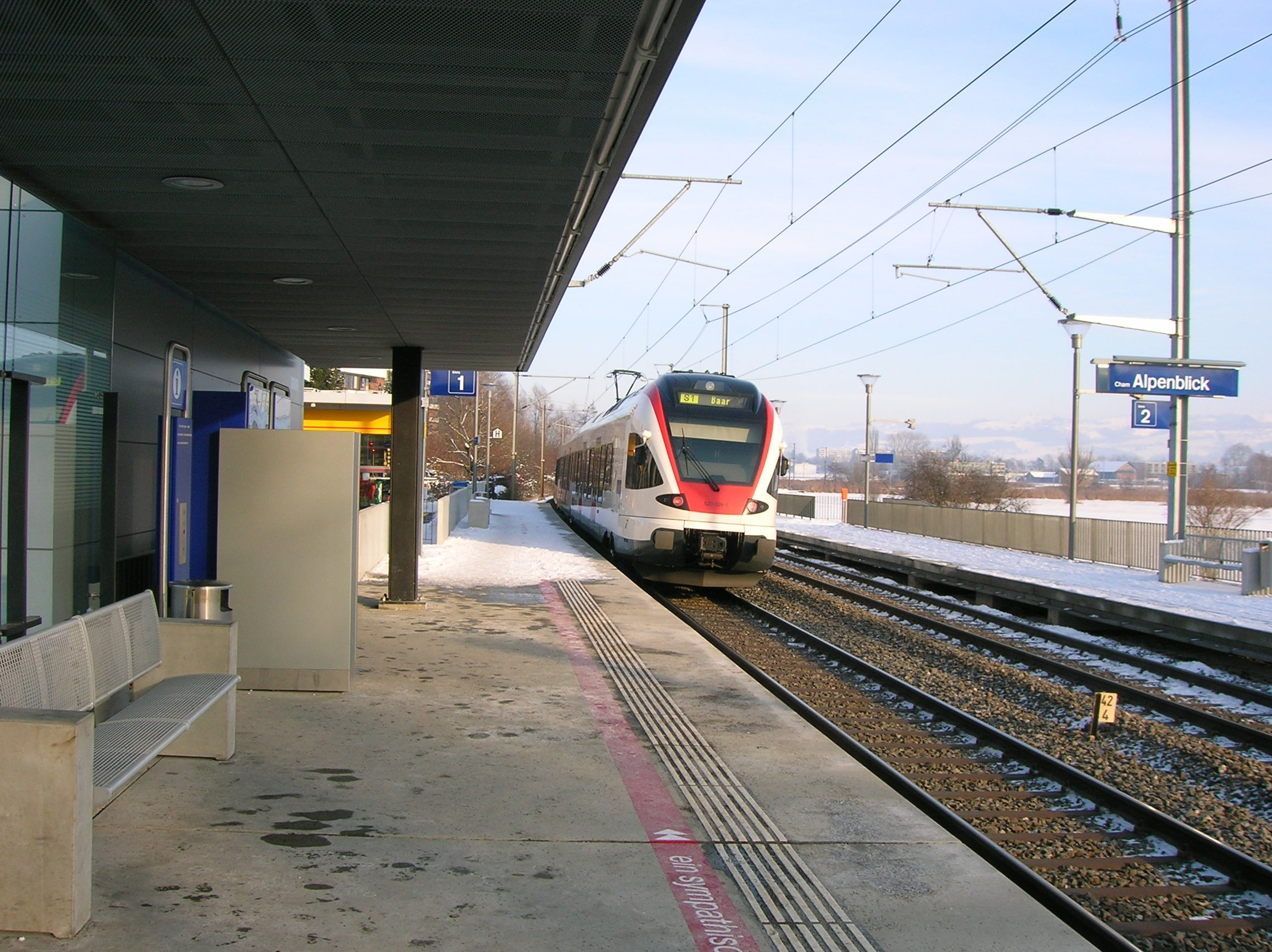
- SBB train arrives at the station in 2005

General information
- Location: Cham; Switzerland
- Coordinates: 47°10′56″N 8°28′17″E
- Owner: Swiss Federal Railways
- Line: Zug–Lucerne line
- Train operators: Swiss Federal Railways

Services
Preceding station	Lucerne S-Bahn	Following station
Cham towards Sursee	S1	Zug Chollermüli towards Baar
Preceding station	Zug Stadtbahn	Following station
Cham towards Rotkreuz	S1	Zug Chollermüli towards Baar
Location
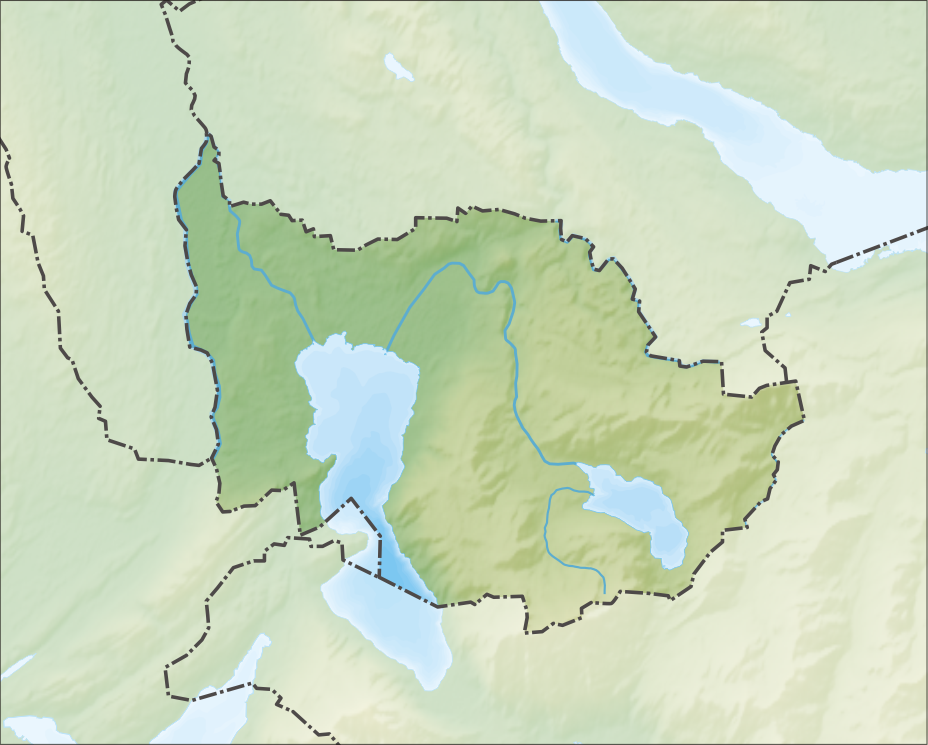
- Location within Switzerland Location within Canton of Zug

Cham Alpenblick railway station (German: Bahnhof Cham Alpenblick) is a railway station in the municipality of Cham, in the Swiss canton of Zug. It is an intermediate stop on the standard gauge Zug–Lucerne line of Swiss Federal Railways.

== Services ==
The following services stop at Cham Alpenblick:

- Lucerne S-Bahn S1/Zug Stadtbahn S1: service every fifteen minutes between Rotkreuz and Baar, with every other train continuing from Rotkreuz to Sursee.
