= Cham railway station =

Cham railway station could refer to:

- Cham railway station (Switzerland) in Cham, Zug, Switzerland
- Cham (Oberpf) station in Cham, Bavaria, Germany
