= Ebikon railway station =

Swiss railway station

Ebikon
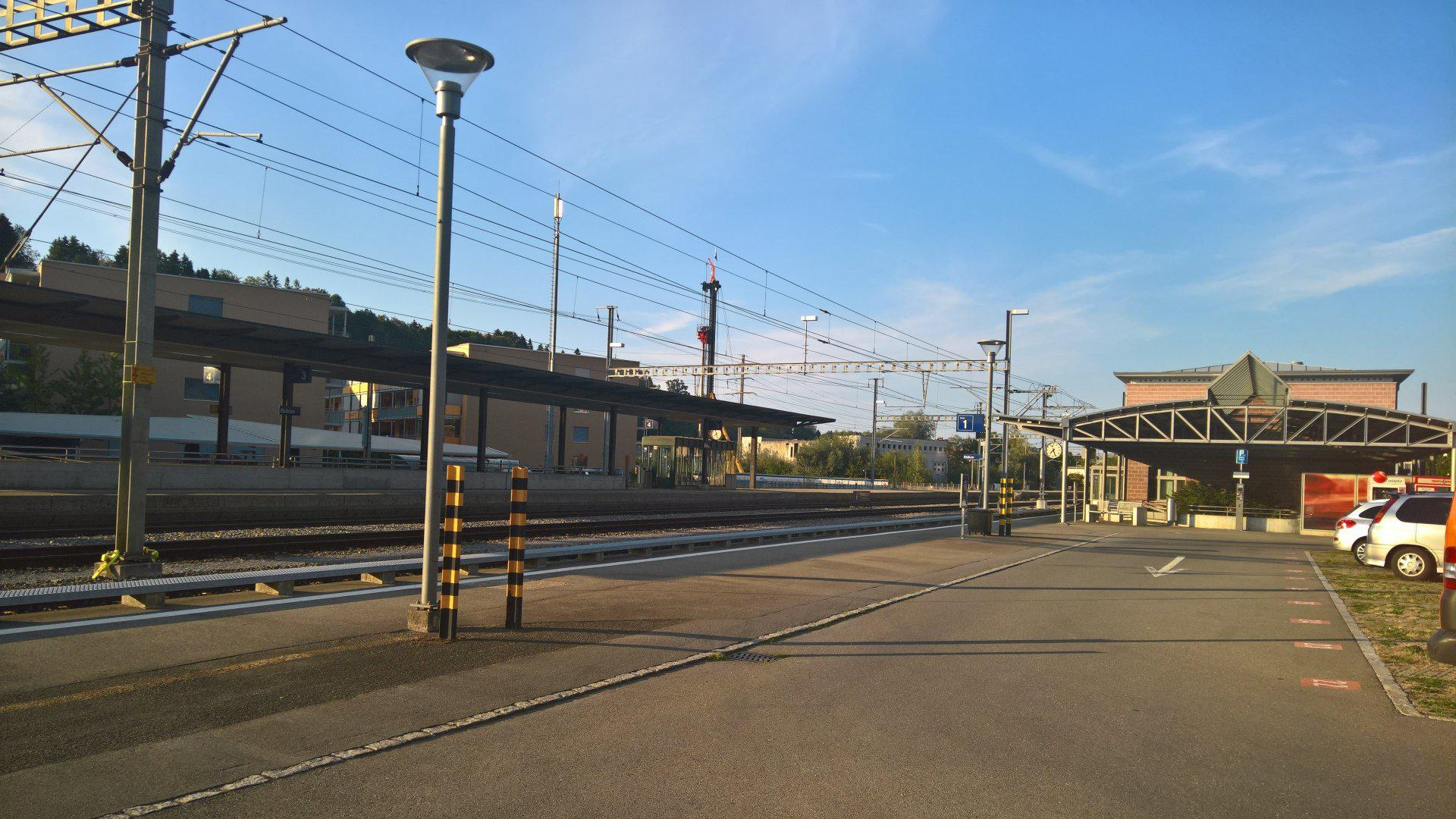
- The station in 2018

General information
- Location: Ebikon; Switzerland
- Coordinates: 47°05′03″N 8°20′32″E
- Owner: Swiss Federal Railways
- Line: Zug–Lucerne line
- Train operators: Swiss Federal Railways

Services
Preceding station	Lucerne S-Bahn	Following station
Lucerne towards Sursee	S1	Buchrain towards Baar
Location
- Location within Switzerland Location within Canton of Lucerne

Ebikon railway station (German: Bahnhof Ebikon) is a railway station in the municipality of Ebikon, in the Swiss canton of Lucerne. It is an intermediate stop on the standard gauge Zug–Lucerne line of Swiss Federal Railways.

== Services ==
The following services stop at Ebikon:

- Lucerne S-Bahn S1: half-hourly service between Sursee and Baar.
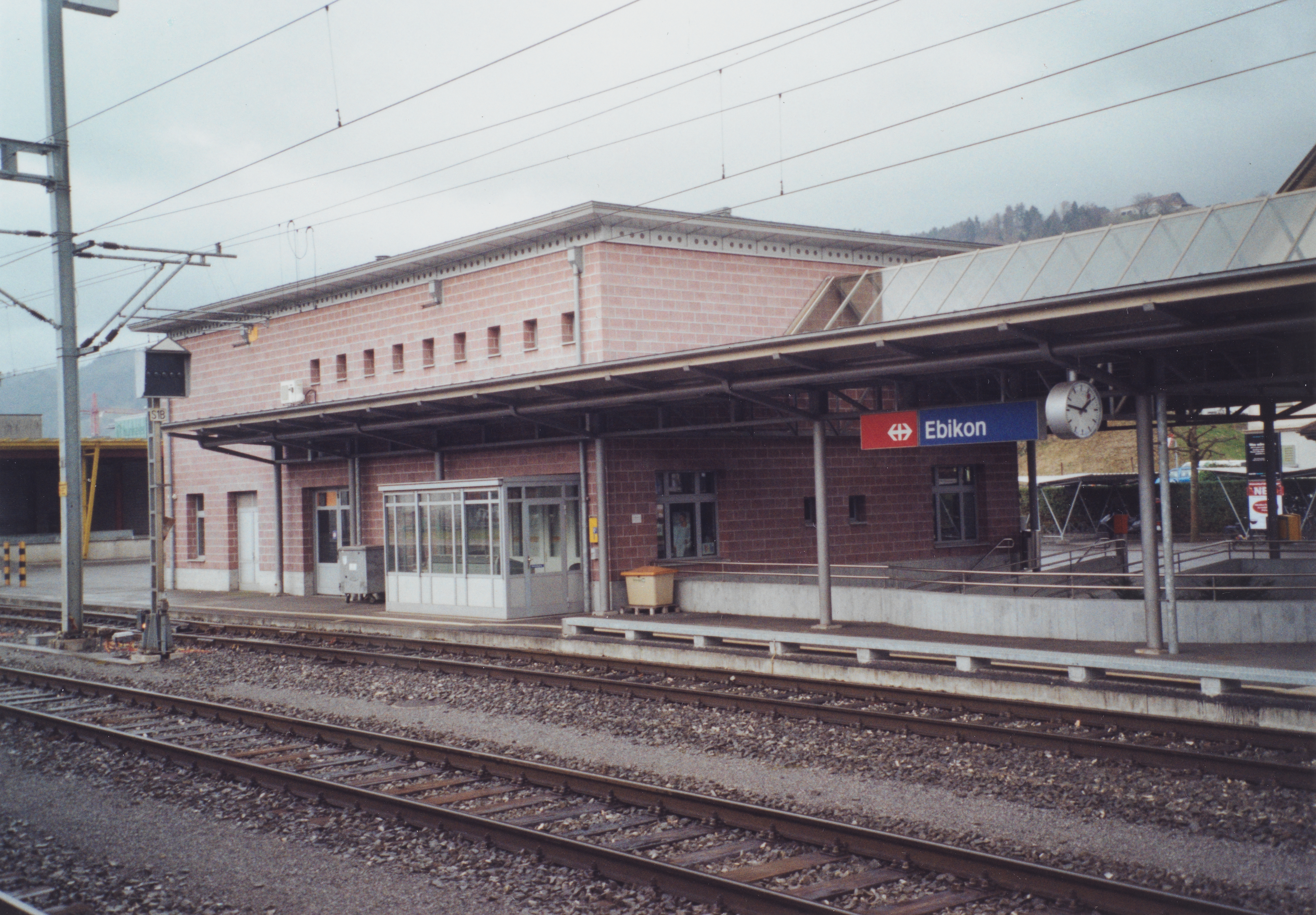
Train-side (2009)

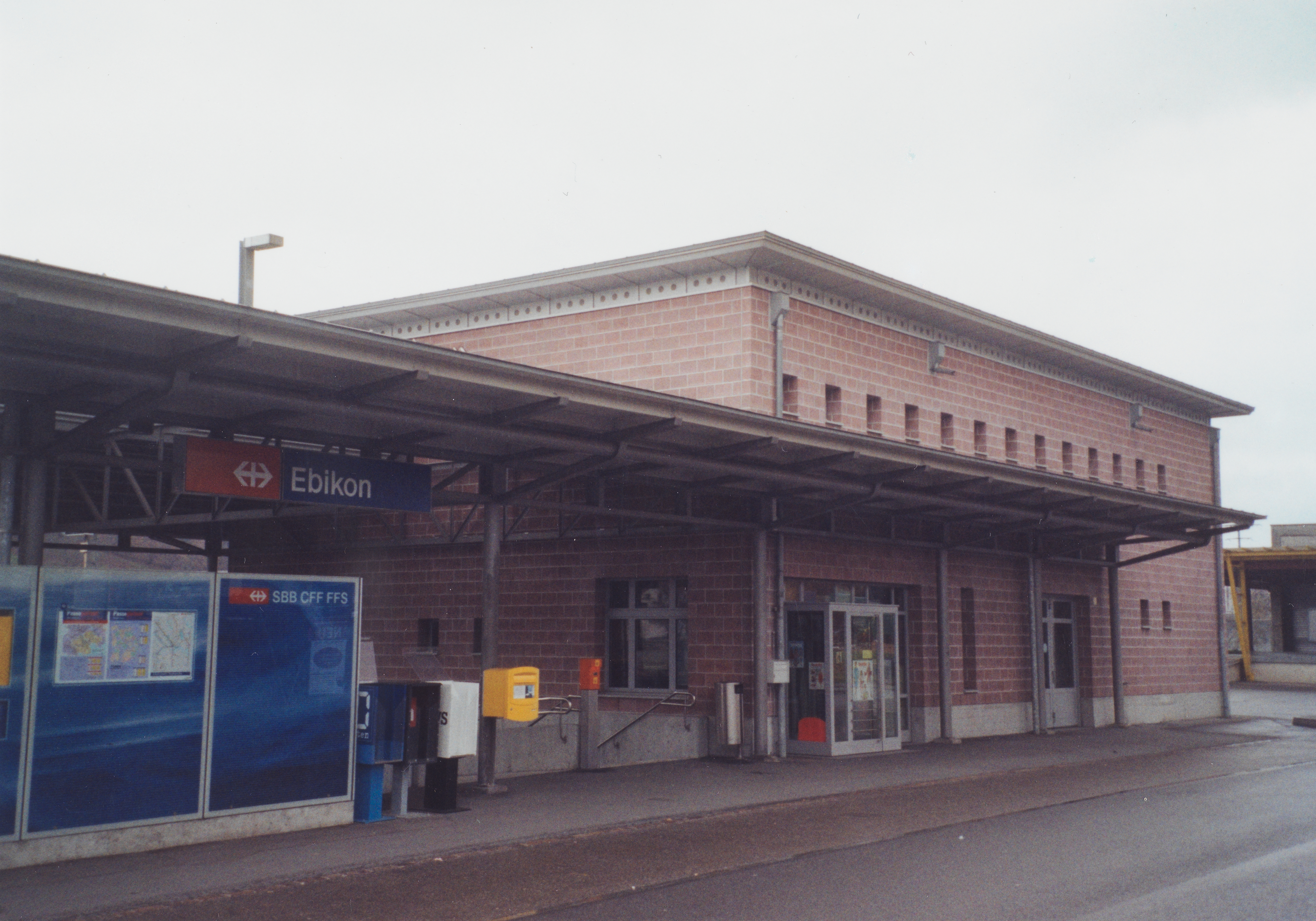
Street-side (2009)

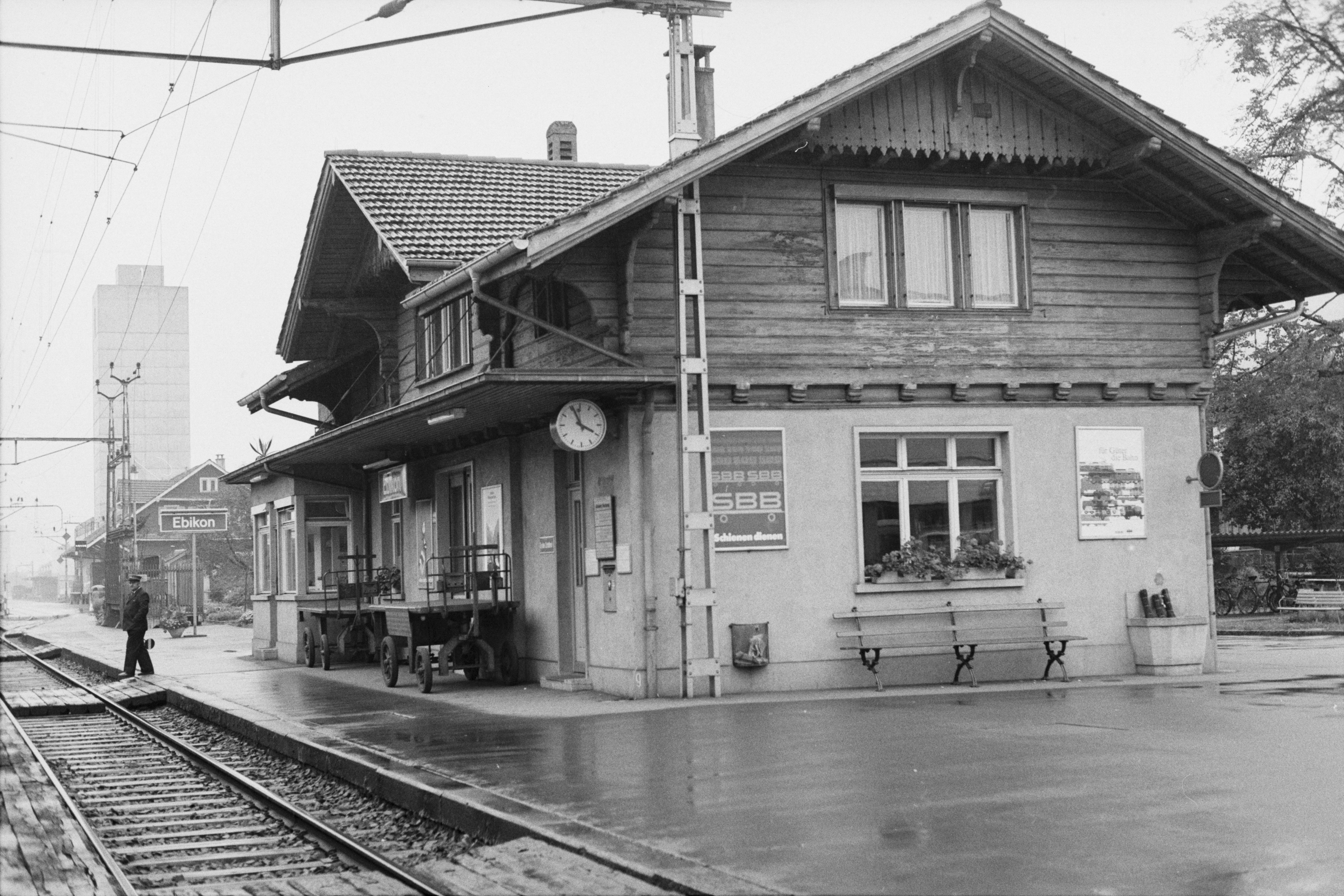
Building from 1864 (in 1976)

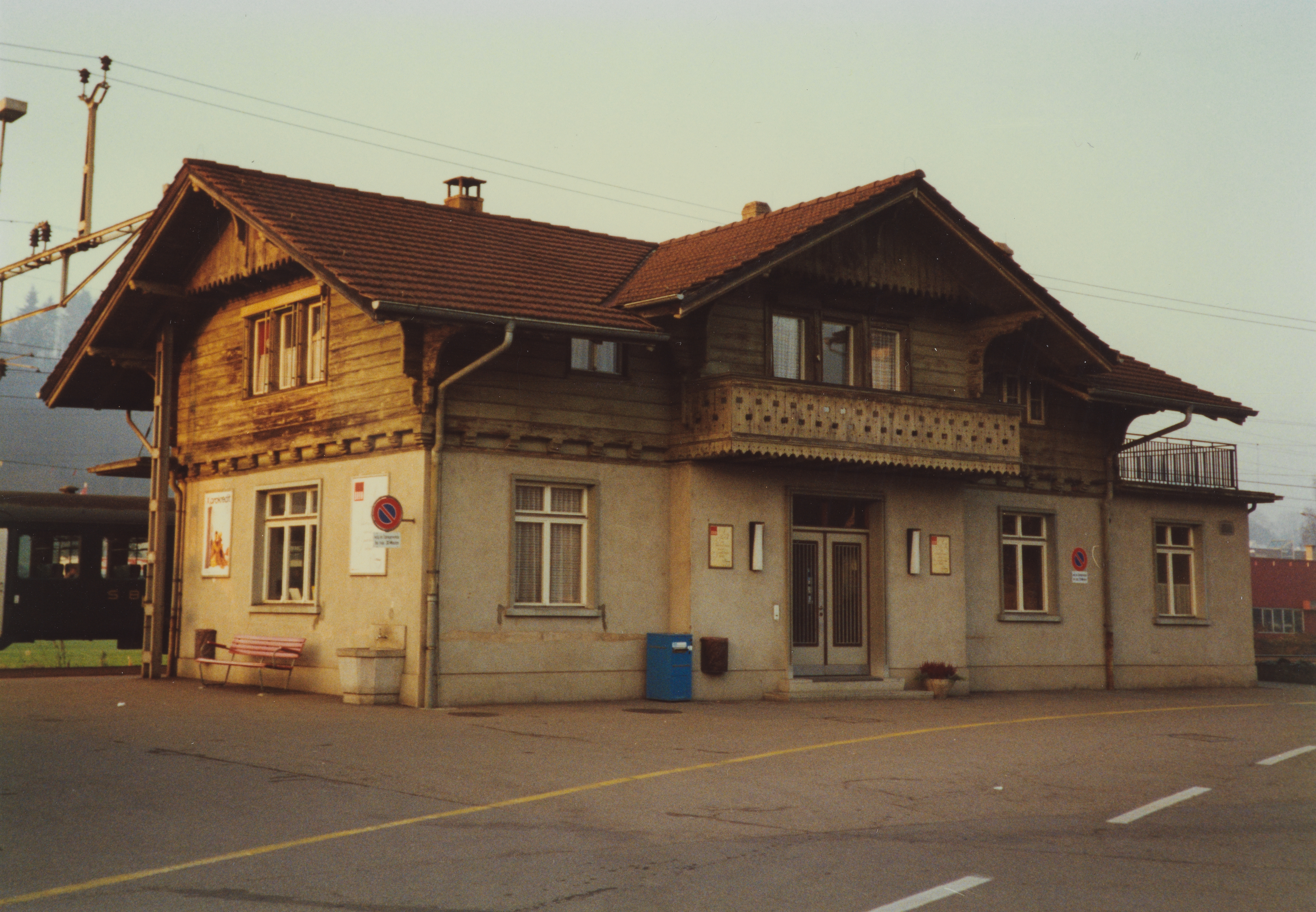
Building from 1864 (in 1989)
