= Zug Schutzengel railway station =

Swiss railway station

Zug Schutzengel
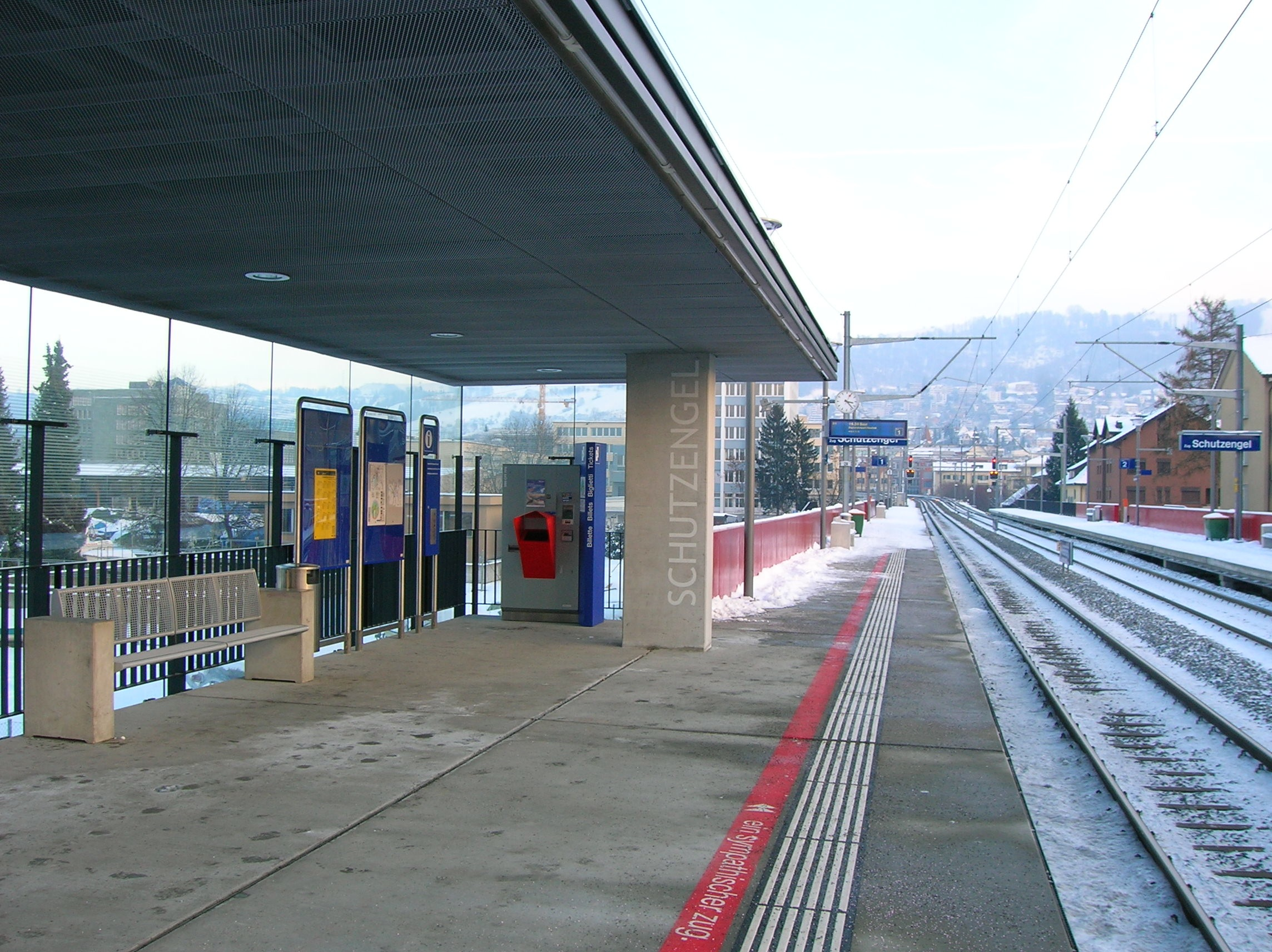
- The station platforms in 2005

General information
- Location: Zug; Switzerland
- Coordinates: 47°10′25″N 8°30′26″E
- Owner: Swiss Federal Railways
- Lines: Zug–Lucerne line; Zürich–Zug line
- Train operators: Swiss Federal Railways

Services
| Preceding station | Lucerne S-Bahn | Following station |
|---|---|---|
| Zug Chollermüli towards Sursee | S1 | Zug towards Baar |
| Preceding station | Zug Stadtbahn | Following station |
| Zug Chollermüli towards Rotkreuz | S1 | Zug towards Baar |
Location
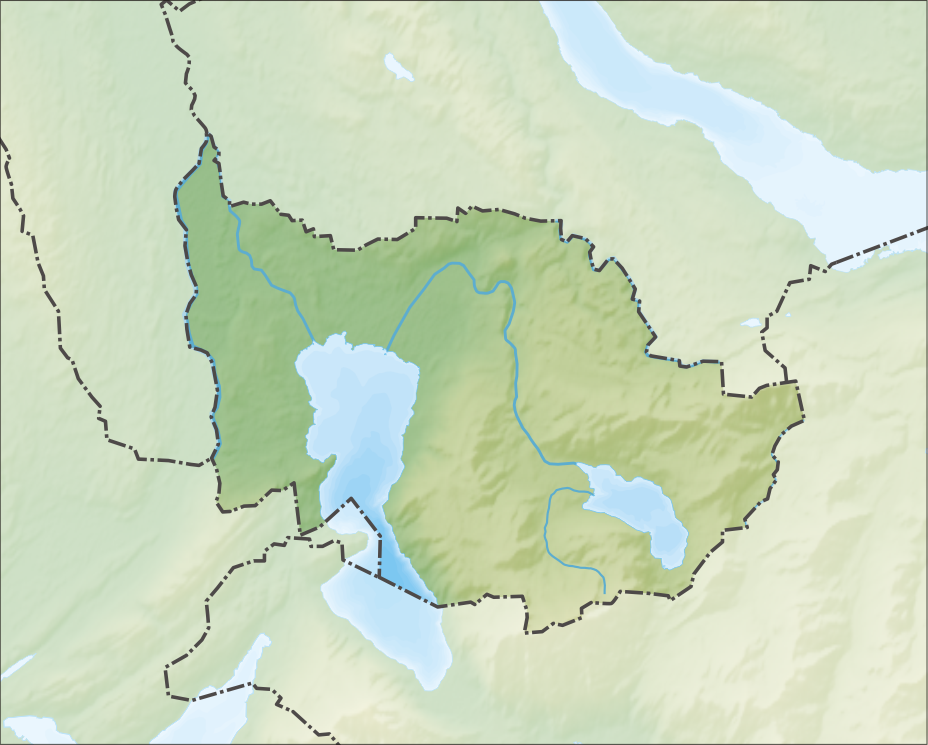
- Location within Switzerland Location within Canton of Zug

Zug Schutzengel railway station (German: Bahnhof Zug Schutzengel) is a railway station in the municipality of Zug, in the Swiss canton of Zug. It is an intermediate stop on the standard gauge Zug–Lucerne and Zürich–Zug lines of Swiss Federal Railways, although no trains on the latter stop here.

== Services ==
The following services stop at Zug Schutzengel:

- Lucerne S-Bahn S1/Zug Stadtbahn S1: service every fifteen minutes between Rotkreuz and Baar, with every other train continuing from Rotkreuz to Sursee.
