= Buchrain railway station =

Swiss railway station

Buchrain
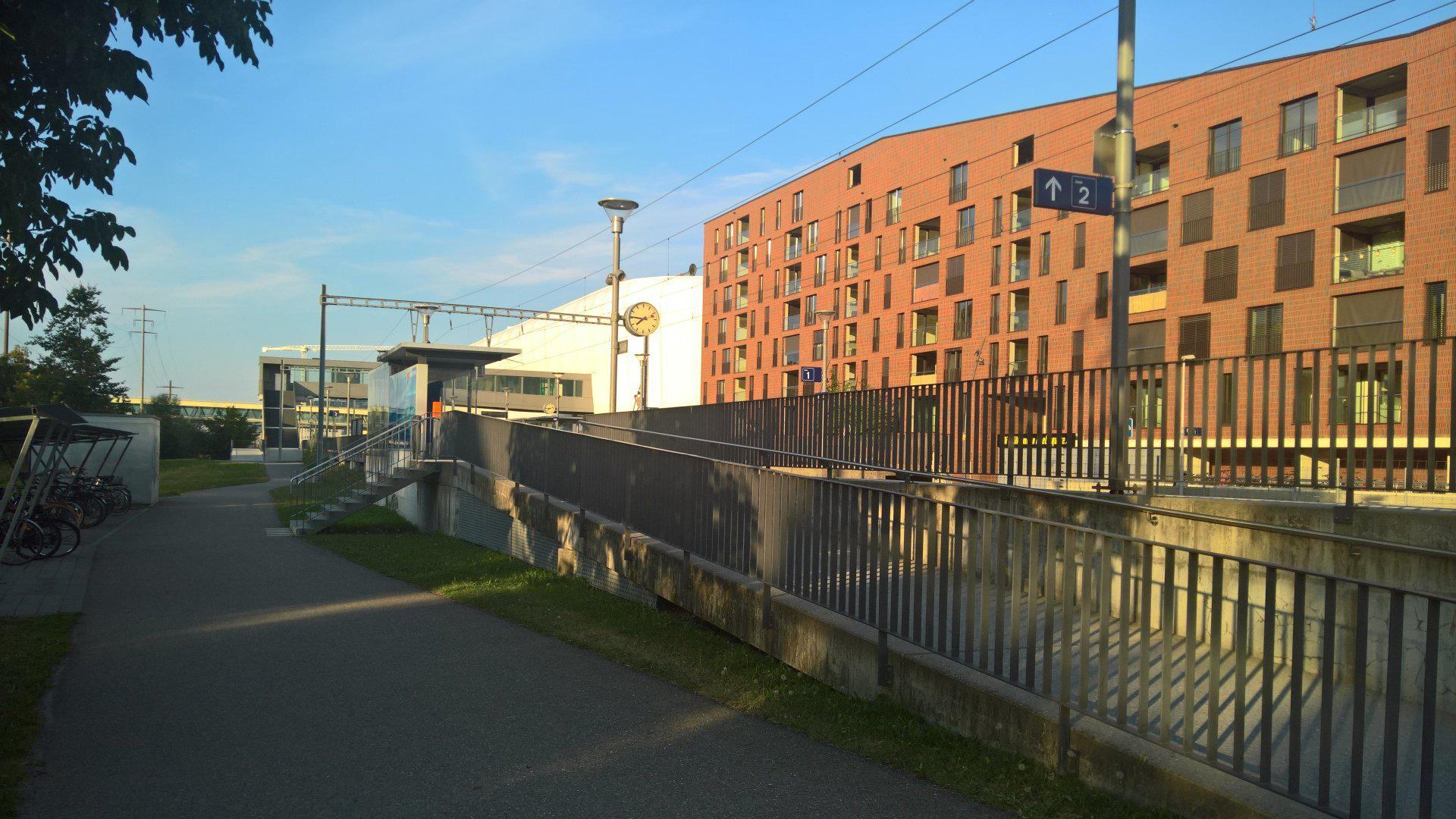
- The station in 2018

General information
- Location: Ebikon; Switzerland
- Coordinates: 47°05′37″N 8°21′24″E
- Owner: Swiss Federal Railways
- Line: Zug–Lucerne line
- Train operators: Swiss Federal Railways

Services
Preceding station	Lucerne S-Bahn	Following station
Ebikon towards Sursee	S1	Root D4 towards Baar
Location
- Location within Switzerland Location within Canton of Lucerne

Buchrain railway station (German: Bahnhof Buchrain) is a railway station in the municipality of Ebikon, in the Swiss canton of Lucerne. It is an intermediate stop on the standard gauge Zug–Lucerne line of Swiss Federal Railways. The station takes its name from the nearby municipality of Buchrain.

== Services ==
The following services stop at Buchrain:

- Lucerne S-Bahn S1: half-hourly service between Sursee and Baar.
