= Root D4 railway station =

Swiss railway station

Root D4
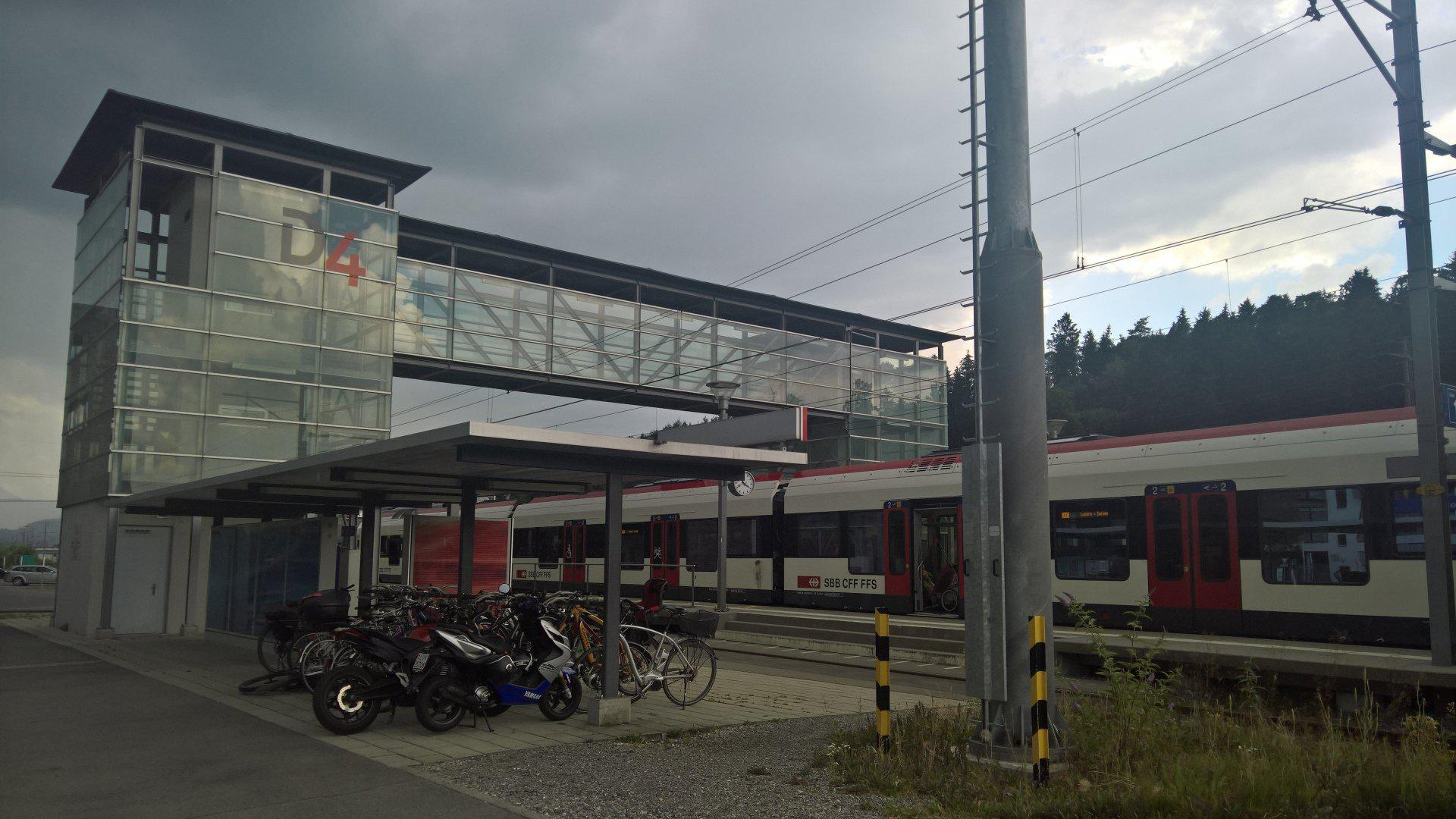
- The station in 2018

General information
- Location: Root; Switzerland
- Coordinates: 47°06′17″N 8°22′26″E
- Owner: Swiss Federal Railways
- Line: Zug–Lucerne line
- Train operators: Swiss Federal Railways

History
- Former names: Längenbold

Services
Preceding station	Lucerne S-Bahn	Following station
Buchrain towards Sursee	S1	Gisikon-Root towards Baar
Location
- Location within Switzerland Location within Canton of Lucerne

Root D4 railway station (German: Bahnhof Root D4) is a railway station in the municipality of Root, in the Swiss canton of Lucerne. It is an intermediate stop on the standard gauge Zug–Lucerne line of Swiss Federal Railways. The station takes its name from the nearby D4 Business Village Luzern.

== Services ==
The following services stop at Root D4:

- Lucerne S-Bahn S1: half-hourly service between Sursee and Baar.
