= Hünenberg Zythus railway station =

Swiss railway station

Hünenberg Zythus
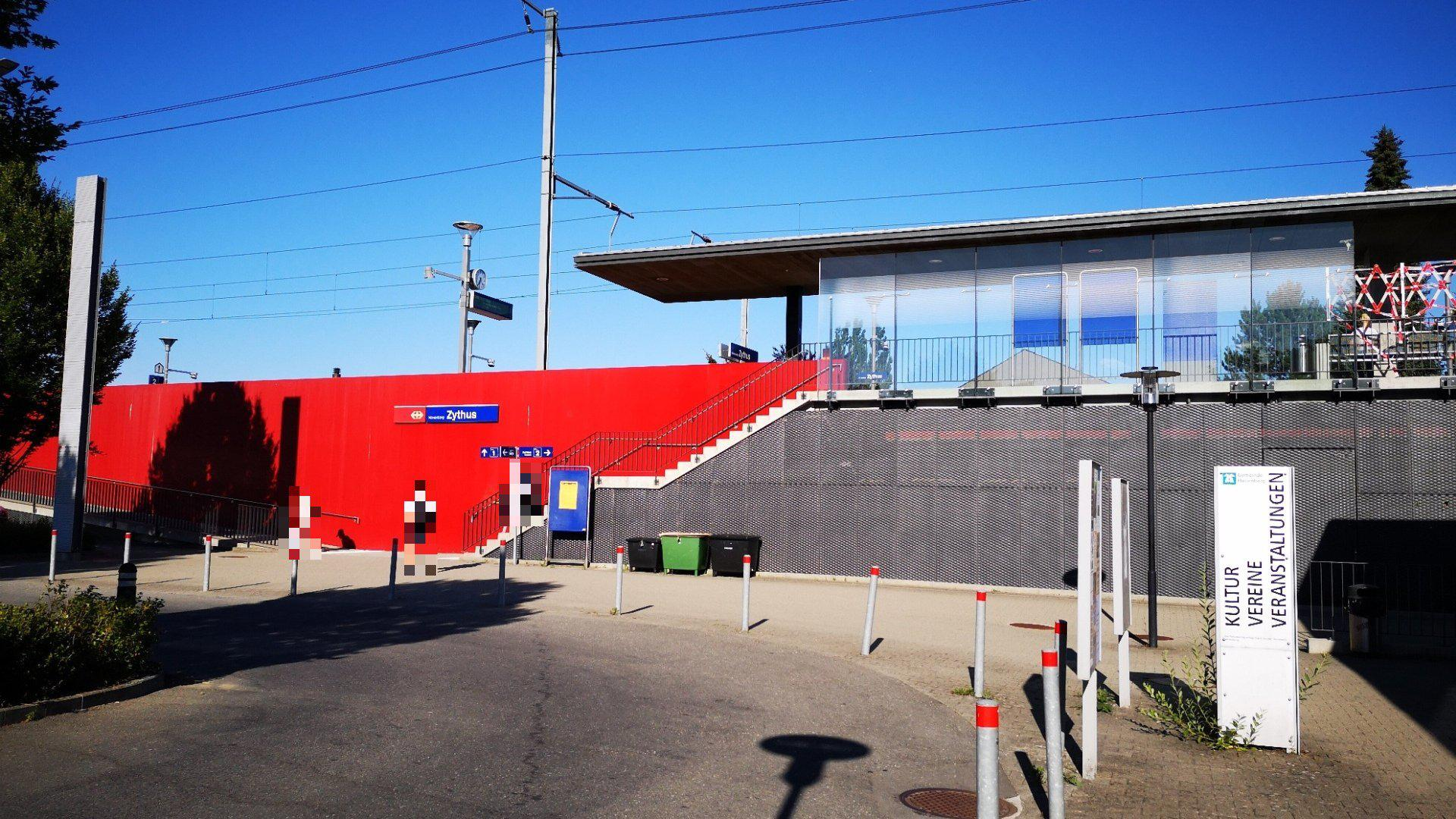
- The station platform in 2018

General information
- Location: Hünenberg; Switzerland
- Coordinates: 47°10′25″N 8°27′00″E
- Owner: Swiss Federal Railways
- Line: Zug–Lucerne line
- Train operators: Swiss Federal Railways

Services
Preceding station	Lucerne S-Bahn	Following station
Hünenberg Chämleten towards Sursee	S1	Cham towards Baar
Preceding station	Zug Stadtbahn	Following station
Hünenberg Chämleten towards Rotkreuz	S1	Cham towards Baar
Location
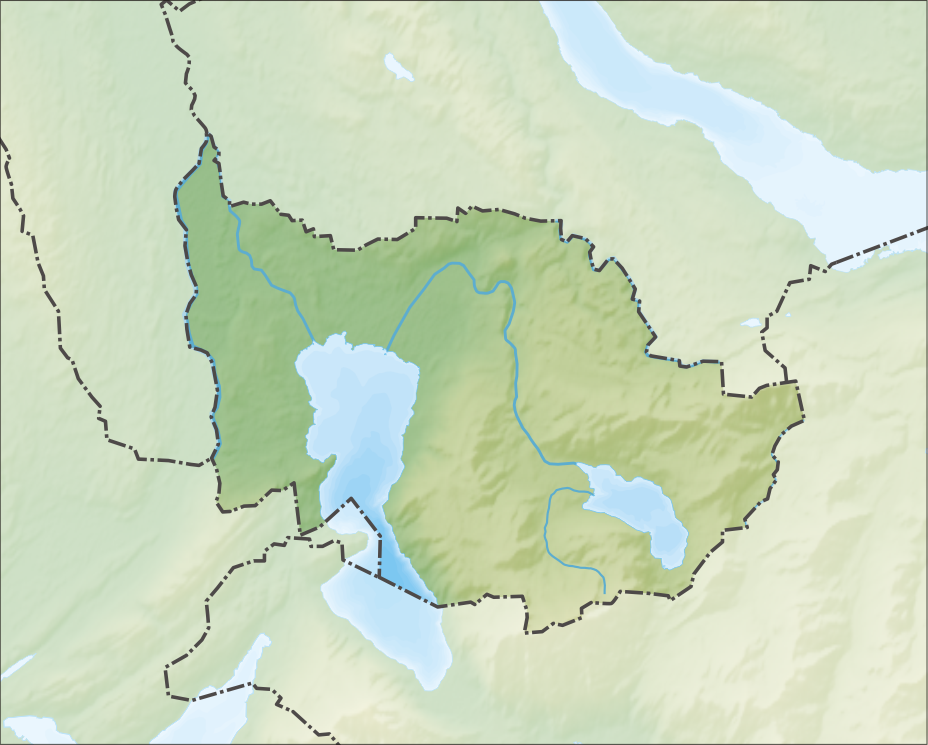
- Location within Switzerland Location within Canton of Zug

Hünenberg Zythus railway station (German: Bahnhof Hünenberg Zythus) is a railway station in the municipality of Hünenberg, in the Swiss canton of Zug. It is an intermediate stop on the standard gauge Zug–Lucerne line of Swiss Federal Railways.

== Services ==
The following services stop at Hünenberg Zythus:

- Lucerne S-Bahn S1/Zug Stadtbahn S1: service every fifteen minutes between Rotkreuz and Baar, with every other train continuing from Rotkreuz to Sursee.
