= Zug Chollermüli railway station =

Swiss railway station

Zug Chollermüli
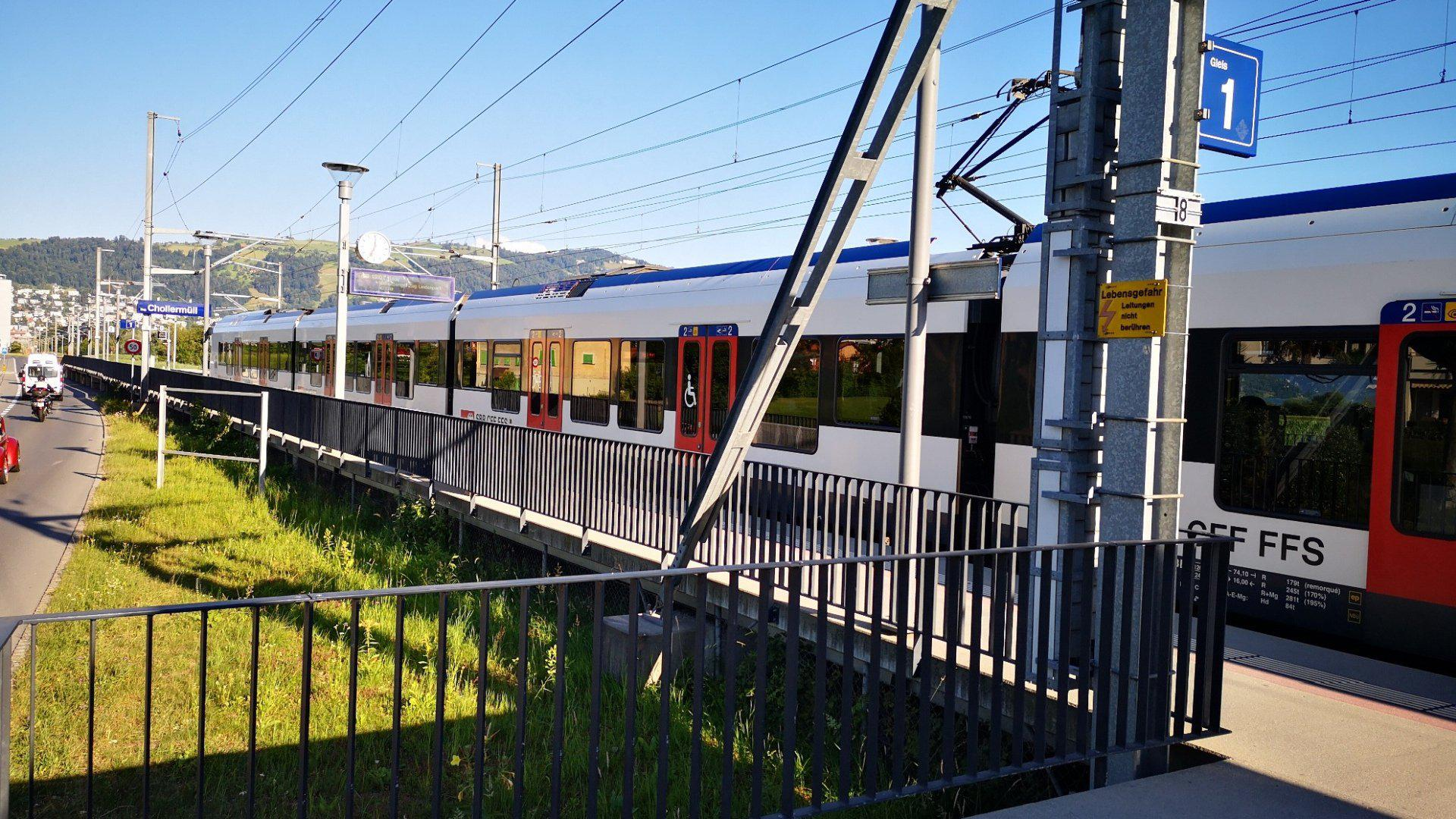
- SBB train at the station in 2018

General information
- Location: Zug; Switzerland
- Coordinates: 47°10′49″N 8°29′12″E
- Owner: Swiss Federal Railways
- Lines: Zug–Lucerne line; Zürich–Zug line
- Train operators: Swiss Federal Railways

History
- Opened: 2004
- Former names: Kollermühle (at location, 1902 to 1966)

Services
Preceding station	Lucerne S-Bahn	Following station
Cham Alpenblick towards Sursee	S1	Zug Schutzengel towards Baar
Preceding station	Zug Stadtbahn	Following station
Cham Alpenblick towards Rotkreuz	S1	Zug Schutzengel towards Baar
Location
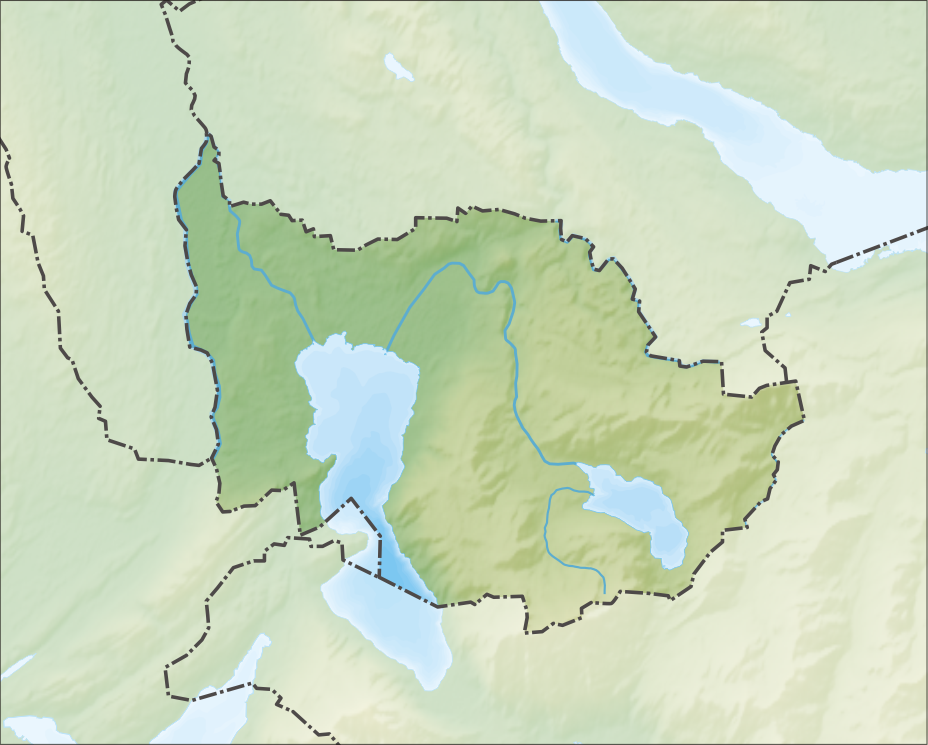
- Location within Switzerland Location within Canton of Zug

Zug Chollermüli railway station (German: Bahnhof Zug Chollermüli) is a railway station in the municipality of Zug, in the Swiss canton of Zug. It is located at the junction of the standard gauge Zug–Lucerne and Zürich–Zug lines of Swiss Federal Railways, although no trains on the latter stop here.

In the past, the station Kollermühle had been at this location (1902 to 1966).

== Services ==
The following services stop at Zug Chollermüli:

- Lucerne S-Bahn S1/Zug Stadtbahn S1: service every fifteen minutes between Rotkreuz and Baar, with every other train continuing from Rotkreuz to Sursee.
