= Gisikon-Root railway station =

Swiss railway station

Gisikon-Root
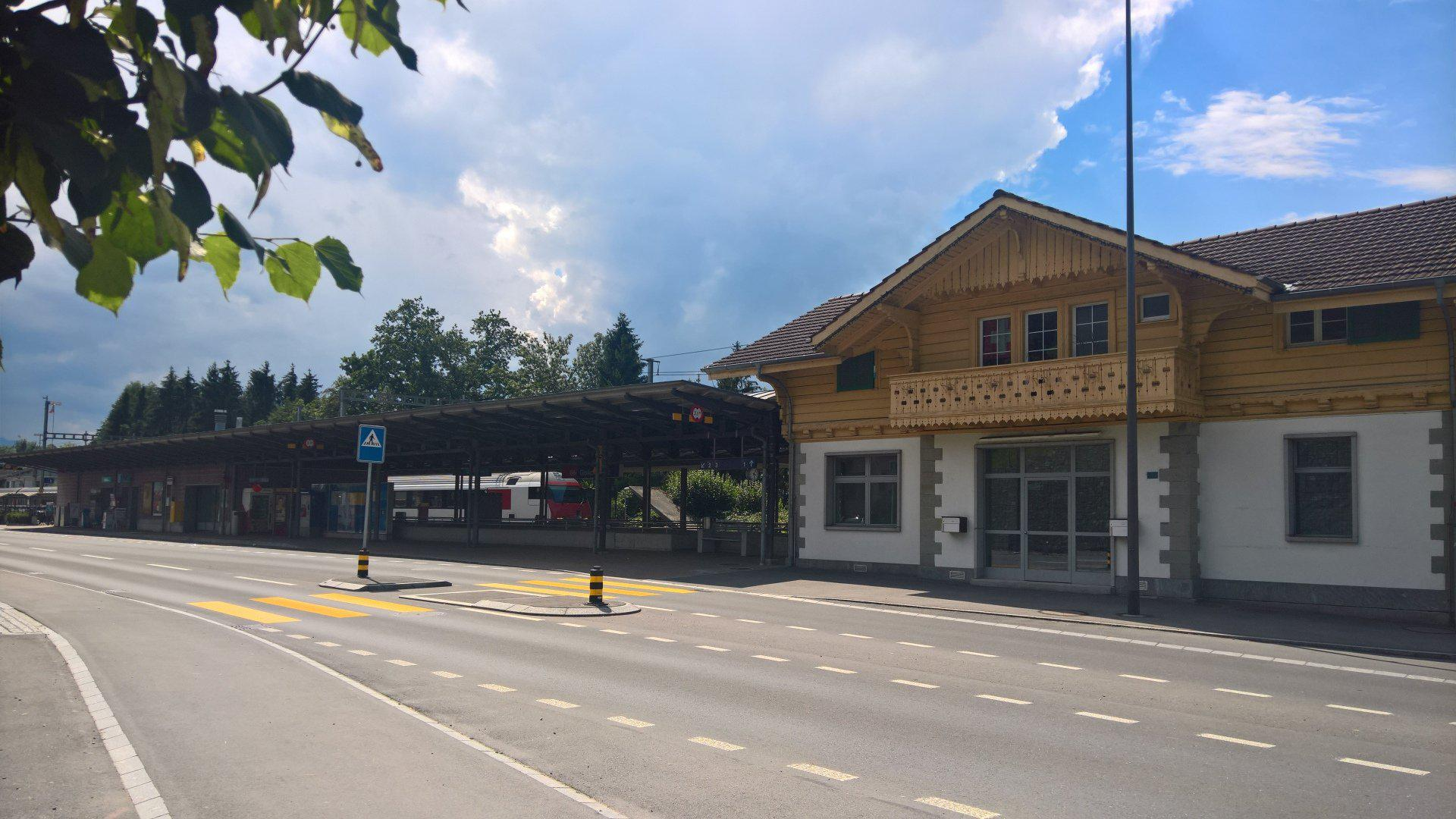
- The station in 2018

General information
- Location: Root; Switzerland
- Coordinates: 47°07′17″N 8°23′41″E
- Owner: Swiss Federal Railways
- Line: Zug–Lucerne line
- Train operators: Swiss Federal Railways

History
- Former names: Gisikon

Services
Preceding station	Lucerne S-Bahn	Following station
Root D4 towards Sursee	S1	Rotkreuz towards Baar
Location
- Location within Switzerland Location within Canton of Lucerne

Gisikon-Root railway station (German: Bahnhof Gisikon-Root) is a railway station in the municipality of Root, in the Swiss canton of Lucerne. It is an intermediate stop on the standard gauge Zug–Lucerne line of Swiss Federal Railways.

== Services ==
The following services stop at Gisikon-Root:

- Lucerne S-Bahn S1: half-hourly service between Sursee and Baar.
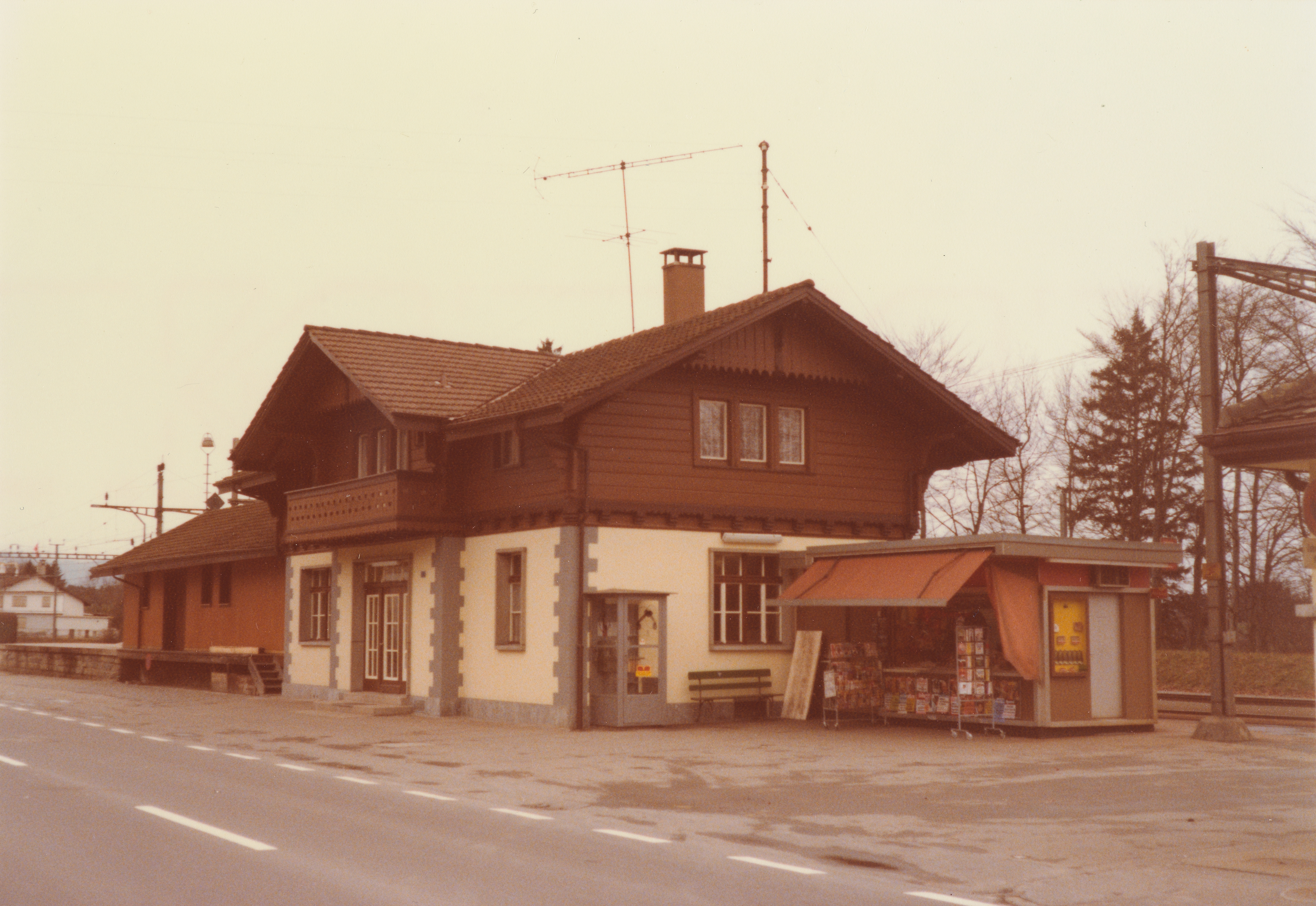
Station in 1979

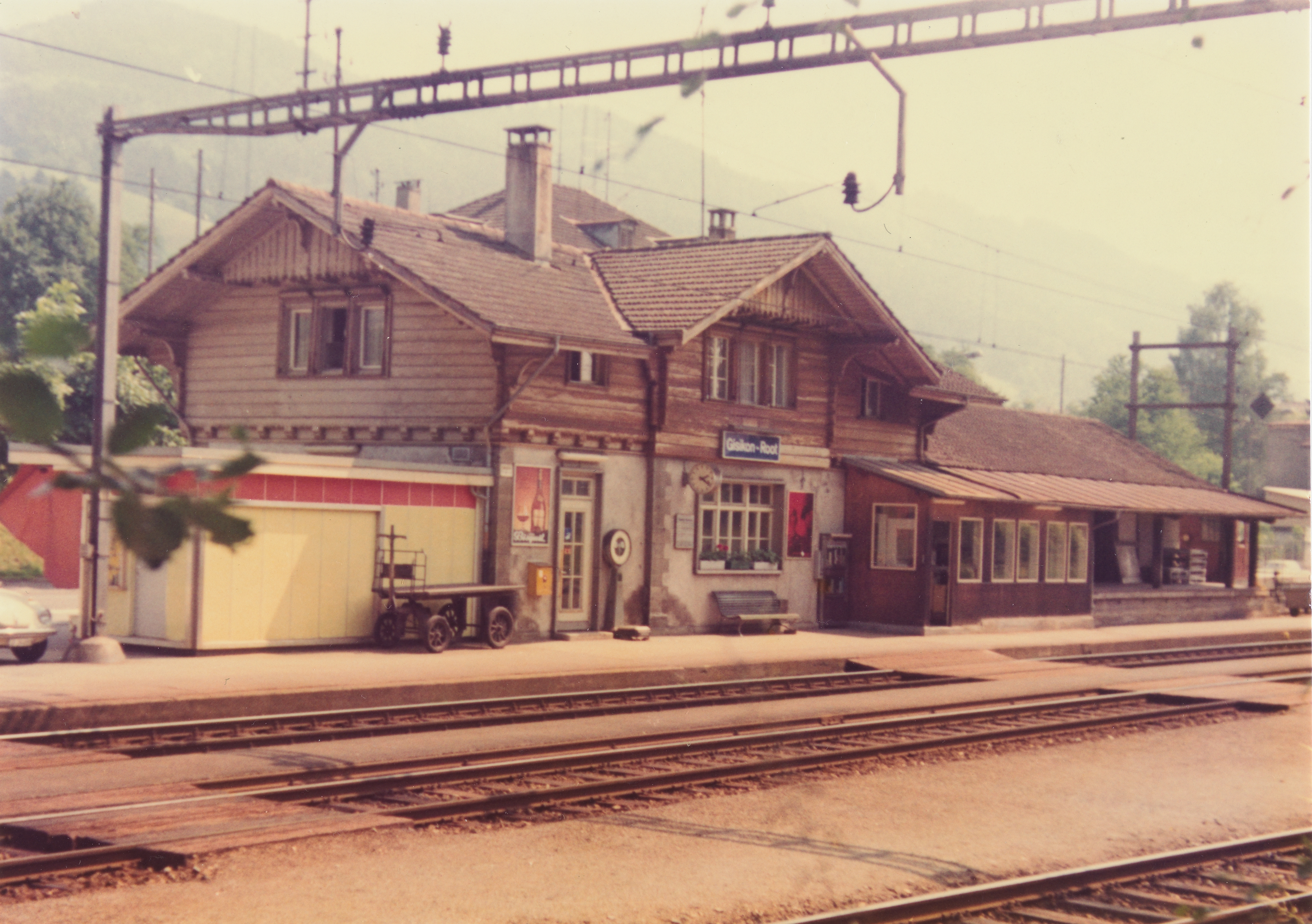
Station in 1979

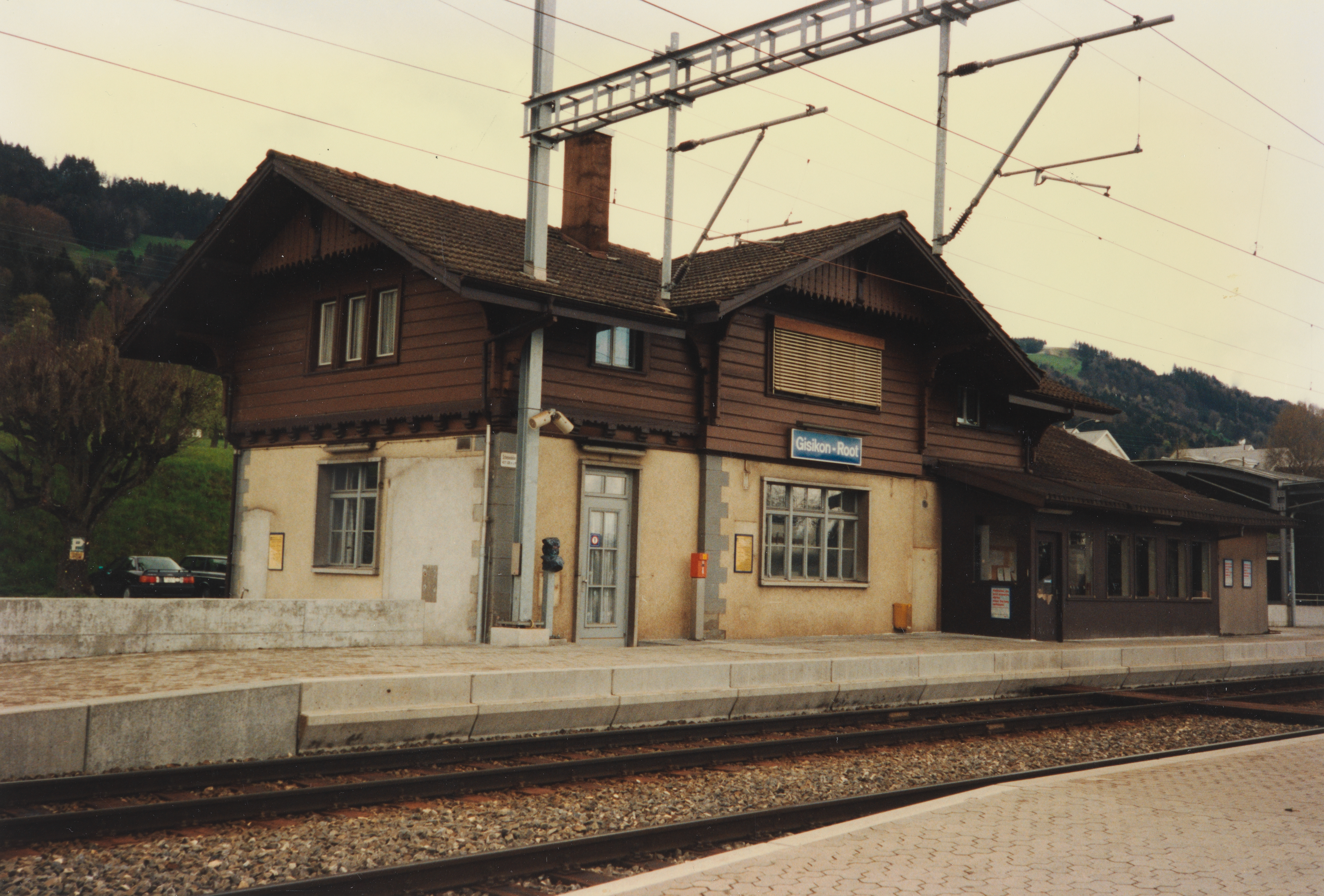
Station in 1994

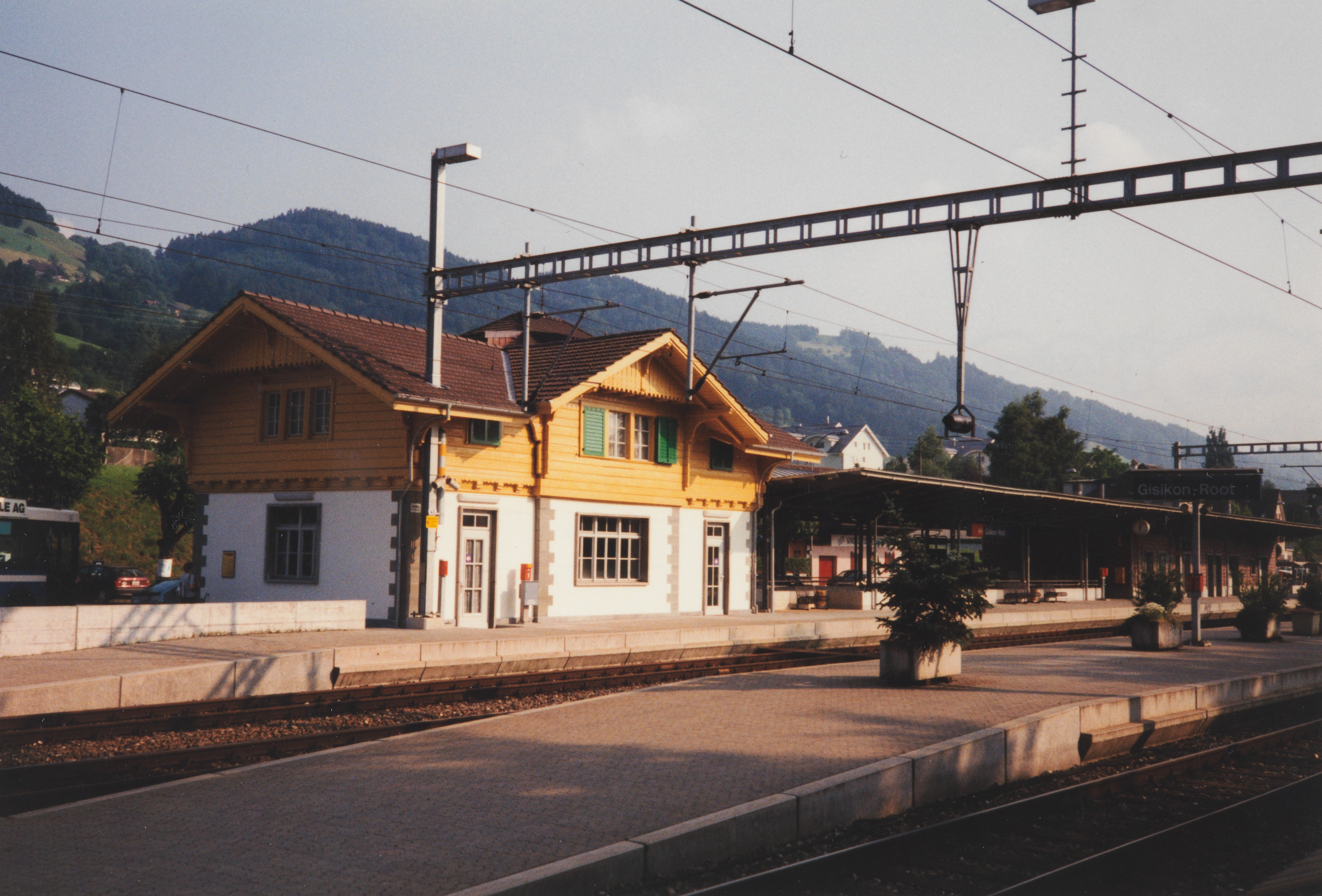
Station in 1995

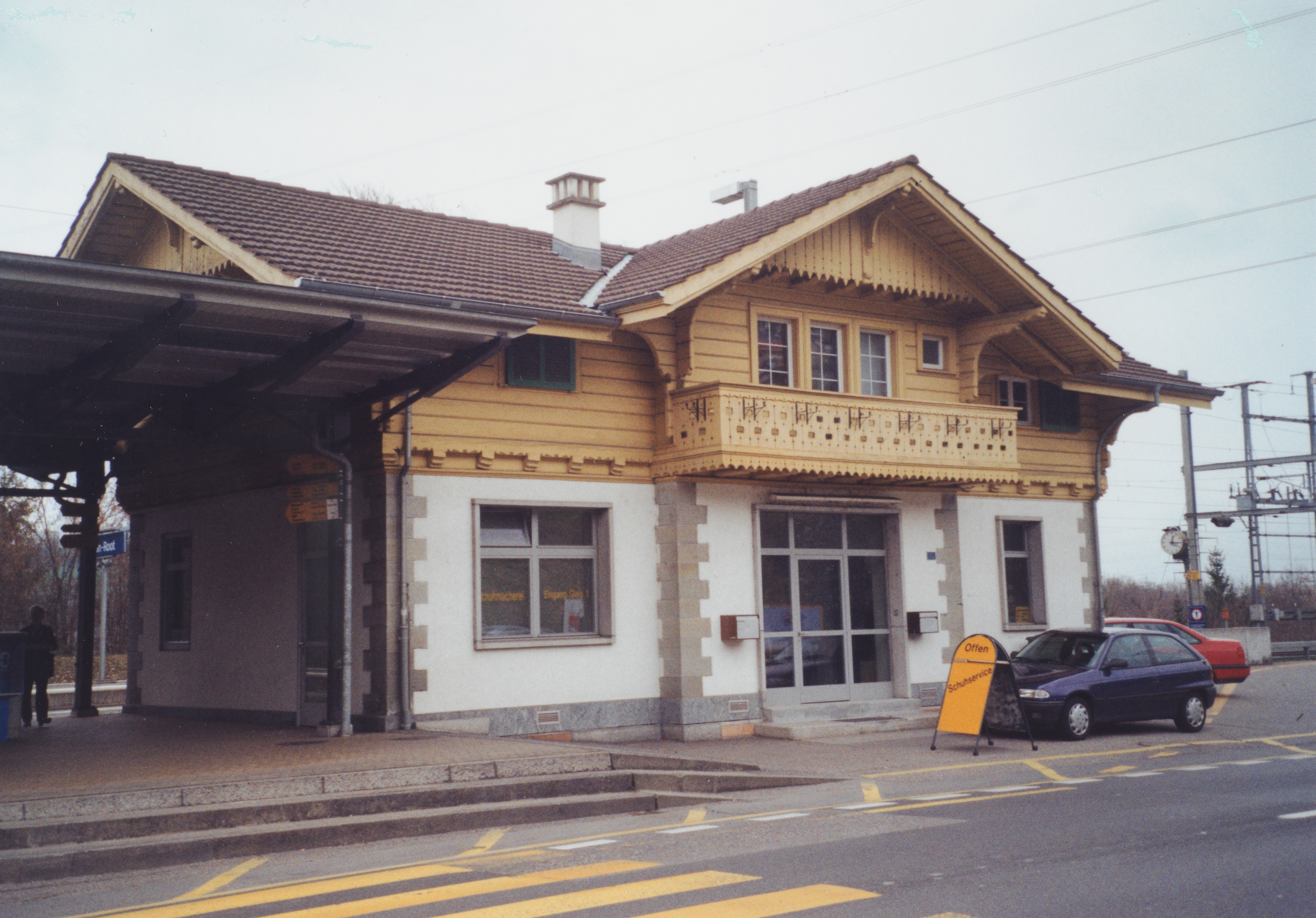
Station in 2009
