= Cham railway station (Switzerland) =

Swiss railway station

Cham
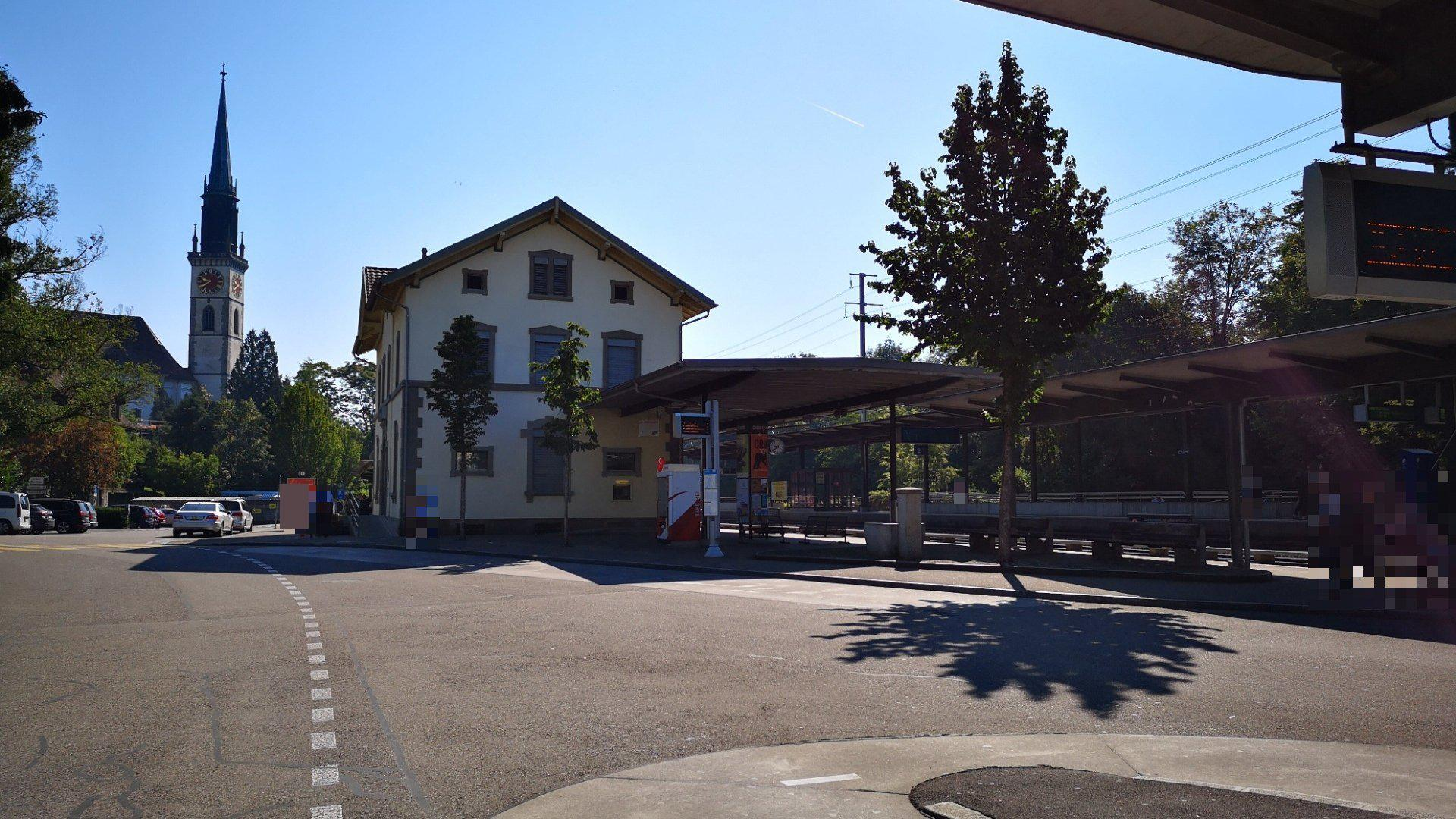
- The station in 2018

General information
- Location: Cham; Switzerland
- Coordinates: 47°10′42″N 8°27′27″E
- Owner: Swiss Federal Railways
- Line: Zug–Lucerne line
- Train operators: Swiss Federal Railways

Services
Preceding station	Lucerne S-Bahn	Following station
Hünenberg Zythus towards Sursee	S1	Cham Alpenblick towards Baar
Preceding station	Zug Stadtbahn	Following station
Hünenberg Zythus towards Rotkreuz	S1	Cham Alpenblick towards Baar
Location
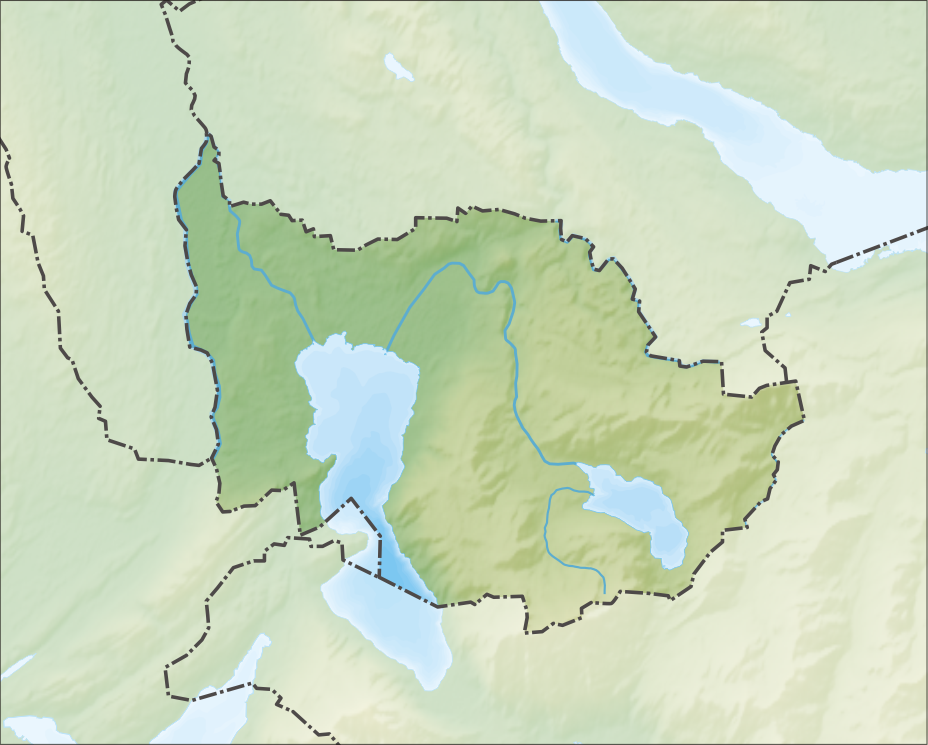
- Location within Switzerland Location within Canton of Zug

Cham railway station (German: Bahnhof Cham) is a railway station in the municipality of Cham, in the Swiss canton of Zug. It is an intermediate stop on the standard gauge Zug–Lucerne line of Swiss Federal Railways.

== Services ==
As of December 2024, the following services stop at Cham:

- Lucerne S-Bahn S1/Zug Stadtbahn S1: service every fifteen minutes between Rotkreuz and Baar, with every other train continuing from Rotkreuz to Sursee.

== See also ==
- Rail transport in Switzerland
