= Zug–Lucerne railway =

Railway line in Switzerland

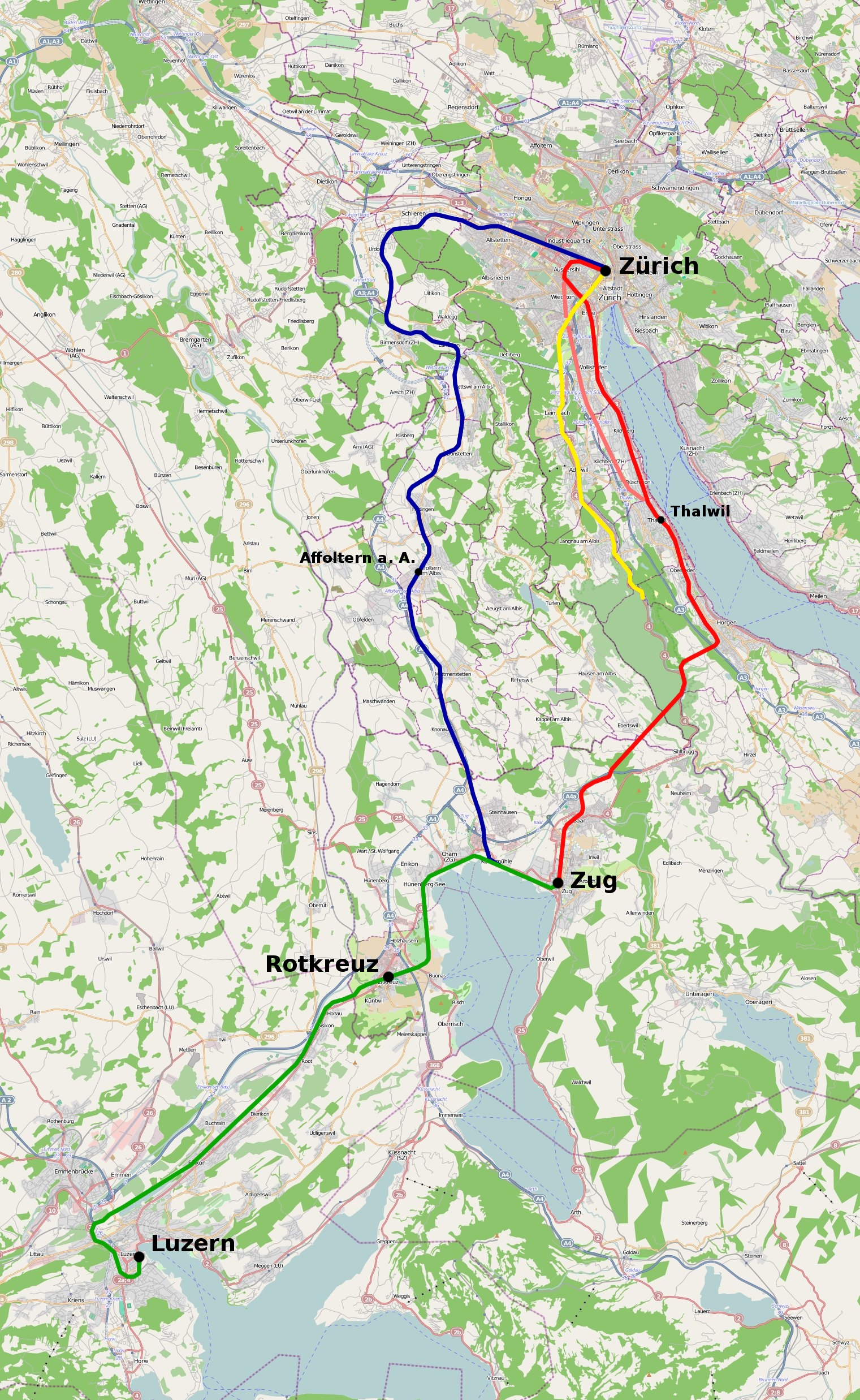
- Zürich-Luzern railways: the Zug–Lucerne railway is shown in green and the original Zürich–Zug railway is shown in blue

Overview
- Owner: Swiss Federal Railways
- Line number: 660
- Locale: Switzerland
- Termini: Zug, Canton of Zürich; Lucerne, Canton of Lucerne

Technical
- Line length: 67 km (42 mi)
- Track gauge: 1,435 mm (4 ft 8 1/2 in) standard gauge
- Electrification: 15 kV/16.7 Hz AC overhead catenary
- Highest elevation: 514 m (1,686 ft)
- Maximum incline: 1.1%

The Zug–Luzern railway is a mainline railway line in Switzerland, connecting the cities of Zug and Lucerne. It was opened on 1 June 1864 by the Zürich–Zug–Lucerne Railway (Zürich-Zug-Luzern-Bahn). The Zürich–Zug railway was opened by the same company at the same time.

== Route ==
The line was connected until 1970 at a triangular junction ("wye") at Kollermühle with the branch to Zurich Altstetten so that trains could run directly from Lucerne to Zurich. The station was a terminal station until the opening of the Thalwil–Arth-Goldau railway. With the introduction of the new line, the station was rebuilt with a station building between the diverging lines. The Zug reversing loop, which made it possible to run from both directions into the station, was also built at that time. This was closed in 1990.

The line was electrified at 15 kV 16 2/3 Hz AC on 9 October 1922.

Double track was opened between Zug and Cham on 5 May 1990. There have been two tracks between Kollermülle station and the branch to the Zug loop since the opening of the line, but these were used separately, that is one was used for services to/from Affoltern and the other to/from Rotkreuz. Up to that time, the trains from Affoltern always ran via the Zug loop.

An isolated section of double track was opened between Ebikon station and Rotsee on 29 May 1994. The line between the stations of Ebikon and Gisikon-Root has also been double-track since 27 September 1995.

When the line between Gisikon-Root and Rotkreuz was doubled, some bends were straightened so that the line speed could be increased. This section has been double-track since 11 May 1996.

The line between Cham and Rotkreuz has been double track since 14 December 2008. Before that, not even the Cham–Hünenberg Zythus section had been doubled. There was only a second track south of Zythus to Hünenberg Chämleten station, which ended at a dead-end track.

== History ==
The railway was opened on 1 June 1864 by the Zürich–Zug–Lucerne Railway.

The opening of the Thalwil–Arth-Goldau line had, with the exception of the reconstruction in the area of Zug station, no great impact for the line itself, but trains running between Zürich and Lucerne continued to use the Zug–Lucerne section. Only the operation of passenger trains running towards the Gotthard fell away between Kollermühle and Rotkreuz. Most freight trains from Zürich to Rotkreuz continued to run via the rail triangle. When it was decided to transfer the former shunting yard on the approach to Zürich Hauptbahnhof to Zürich Mülligen (only fast goods and postal traffic) and to Limmattal marshalling yard, it was clear that this traffic would be eliminated. For this reason, on 19 November 1970, the side of the rail triangle that connected Steinhausen with Cham was closed and dismantled. Freight trains now run via the Rupperswil–Immensee railway line to Rotkreuz.

The introductions of two S-Bahn systems had some impact on the line. The introduction of the Zürich S-Bahn in 1990, when the Zug loop was closed, had less impact.

By contrast, the introduction of the 2004 Zug Stadtbahn in 2004 had a massive impact on the Zug–Luzern line, which underwent a major refurbishment so that services could be introduced between Zug and Baar at quarter-hourly intervals. In addition, five additional stations were established.
